= The Best of Bros =

Compilation album by Bros
- Released: 1 March 2004
- Recorded: 1987–1991
- Genres: Pop, dance-pop
- Length: 1:17:43
- Label: Columbia
- Producers: Nicky Graham, Gary Stevenson

Bros chronology
| Changing Faces (1991) | The Best of Bros (2004) | I Owe You Nothing: The Best of Bros (2011) |

Professional ratings
Review scores
| Source | Rating |
|---|---|
| AllMusic | 4/5 stars |

The Best of Bros is the first compilation album by British pop band Bros. The album was released on 1 March 2004 by Columbia Records. The album includes all of the band's singles, along with selected album tracks and B-sides. Nicky Graham and Tom Watkins are credited as the songwriters for the tracks taken from Push, instead of their original credit as "The Brothers".

The album has been certified silver by the BPI for sales of over 60,000 copies in the UK.

== Track listing ==
| No. | Title | Writer(s) | Originally on | Length |
|---|---|---|---|---|
| 1. | "When Will I Be Famous?" | Nicky Graham, Tom Watkins | Push | 3:59 |
| 2. | "Drop the Boy" | Graham, Watkins | Push | 3:49 |
| 3. | "Madly in Love" (Joe Smooth Mix) | Luke Goss, Matt Goss, Graham | The Time | 4:28 |
| 4. | "Ten out of Ten" | Graham, Watkins | Push | 4:06 |
| 5. | "Cat Among the Pigeons" | Graham, Watkins | Push | 4:05 |
| 6. | "Too Much" | L. Goss, M. Goss, Graham | The Time | 3:30 |
| 7. | "I Owe You Nothing" | Graham, Watkins | Push | 3:40 |
| 8. | "Liar" | Graham, Watkins | Push | 3:42 |
| 9. | "Chocolate Box" | L. Goss, M. Goss, Graham | The Time | 3:59 |
| 10. | "Money" | L. Goss, M. Goss, Graham | The Time | 4:21 |
| 11. | "It's a Jungle Out There" | Graham, Watkins | Push | 4:14 |
| 12. | "I Quit" | Graham, Watkins | Push | 3:32 |
| 13. | "Changing Faces" | L. Goss, M. Goss | Changing Faces | 3:59 |
| 14. | "Sister" | L. Goss, M. Goss, Graham | The Time | 4:22 |
| 15. | "Life's a Heartbeat" | L. Goss, M. Goss, Graham | B-side of "Chocolate Box" | 4:46 |
| 16. | "Are You Mine?" | L. Goss, M. Goss, Paul Powell | Changing Faces | 4:37 |
| 17. | "Try" | L. Goss, M. Goss | Changing Faces | 3:38 |
| 18. | "I'll Count the Hours" | L. Goss, M. Goss, Graham | B-side of "Sister" | 4:05 |
| 19. | "Silent Night" | Traditional, arr. Graham | Double A-side with "Cat Among the Pigeons" | 3:50 |
| Total length: | | | | 1:17:43 |

- Note: Although not credited as such, "I Quit" is the remixed single version.

== Certification ==
| Region | Certification | Certified units/sales |
|---|---|---|
| United Kingdom (BPI) | Silver | 60,000^{‡} |
^{‡} Sales+streaming figures based on certification alone.

== DVD video ==
A companion DVD, entitled The Big Picture, was released in March 2005, featuring the music videos for all eleven of the band's singles, along with a live concert that had previously been released on VHS video as Bros Live: The Big Push Tour. It also includes a single discography, documentary and photo gallery. The DVD debuted and peaked at number 42 on the UK Video Charts in the week ending 26 March 2005.
