= List of UK top-ten singles in 1988 =

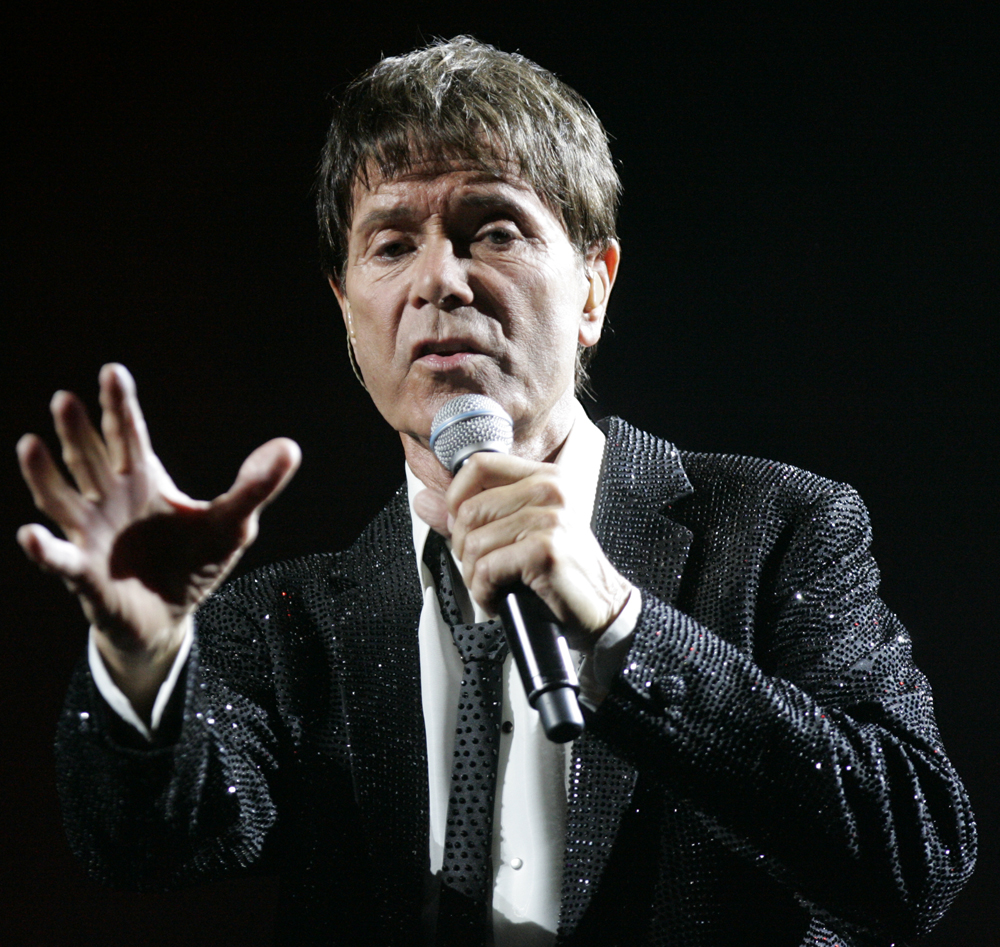
Cliff Richard (pictured in 2013) had the best-selling single of 1988 with "Mistletoe and Wine", his twelfth UK number-one single, which topped the chart for four weeks and became the year's Christmas number-one.

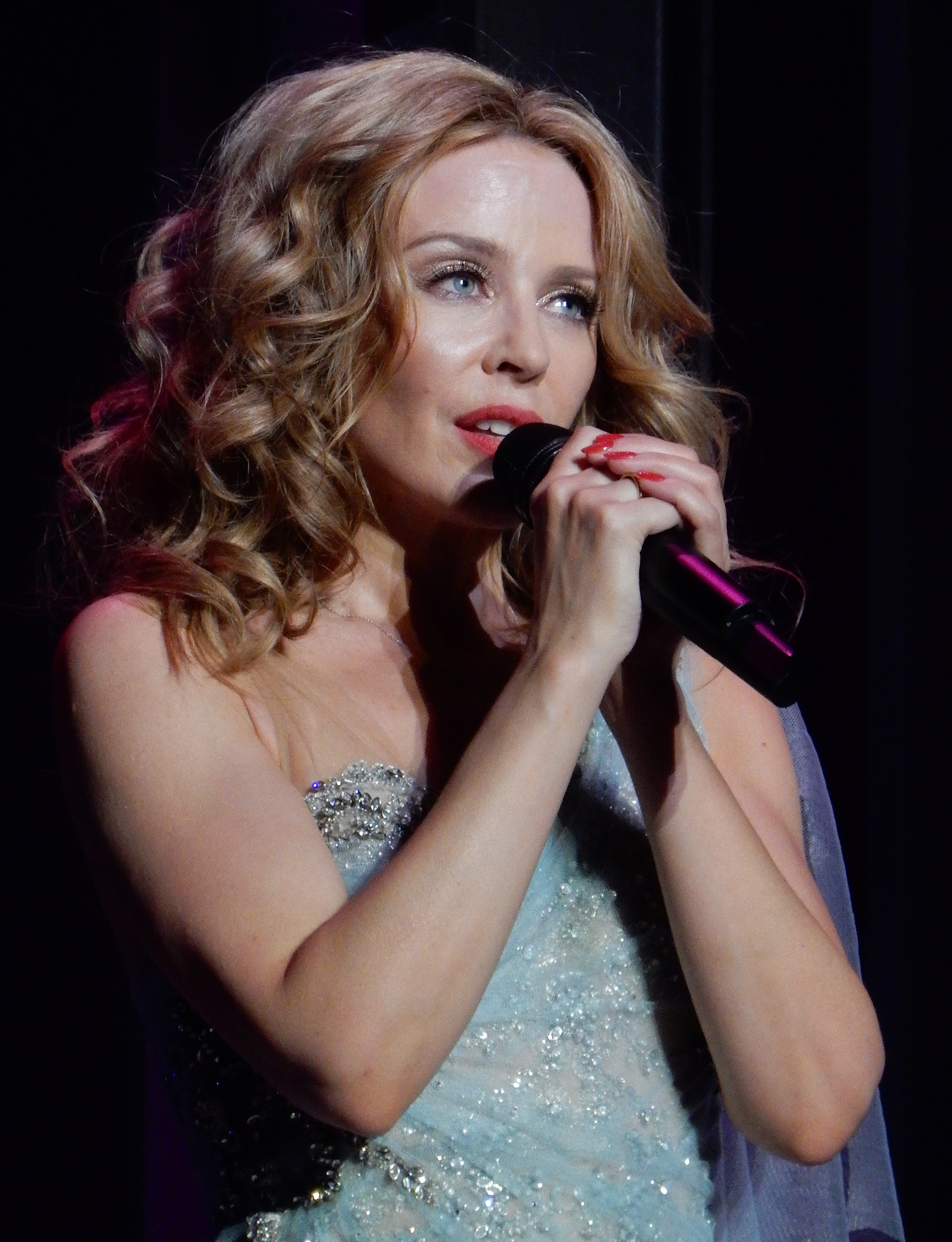
Kylie Minogue (pictured in 2014) went to number-one in February with her debut single "I Should Be So Lucky", which stayed at the top spot for five weeks. The Australian singer had a total of five top 10 singles in the UK this year.

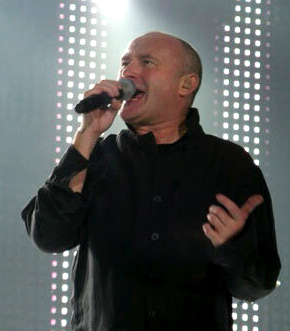
Phil Collins (pictured in 2005) secured three top 10 singles in 1988, the highest-charting of which was his cover of "A Groovy Kind of Love", taken from the soundtrack of the film Buster, which remains his last UK number-one single to date.

The UK Singles Chart is one of many music charts compiled by the Official Charts Company that calculates the best-selling singles of the week in the United Kingdom. Before 2004, the chart was only based on the sales of physical singles. This list shows singles that peaked in the Top 10 of the UK Singles Chart during 1988, as well as singles which peaked in 1987 and 1989 but were in the top 10 in 1988. The entry date is when the single appeared in the top 10 for the first time (week ending, as published by the Official Charts Company, which is six days after the chart is announced).

One-hundred and fifty-five singles were in the top ten in 1988. Nine singles from 1987 remained in the top 10 for several weeks at the beginning of the year, while "Buffalo Stance" by Neneh Cherry, "Crackers International (EP)" by Erasure, "Good Life" by Inner City, "Especially for You" by Kylie and Jason and "Loco in Acapulco" by Four Tops were both released in 1988 but did not reach their peak until 1989. "Heaven is a Place on Earth" by Belinda Carlisle and "When I Fall in Love" by Nat King Cole were the singles from 1987 to reach their peak in 1988. Twenty-nine artists scored multiple entries in the top 10 in 1988. Bros, Everything but the Girl, Jason Donovan, Kylie Minogue and Salt-n-Pepa were among the many artists who achieved their first UK charting top 10 single in 1988.

The 1987 Christmas number-one, "Always on My Mind" by Pet Shop Boys, remained at number-one for the first two weeks of 1988. The first new number-one single of the year was "Heaven Is a Place on Earth" by Belinda Carlisle. Overall, twenty different singles peaked at number-one in 1988, with Kylie Minogue (2) having the most singles hit that position.

== Background ==
=== Multiple entries ===
One-hundred and fifty-five singles charted in the top 10 in 1988, with one-hundred and forty-three singles reaching their peak this year. Nat King Cole and Rick Astley both reached the chart with versions of "When I Fall in Love" (the former entered the chart at the end of 1987 but peaked in this year).

Twenty-nine artists scored multiple entries in the top 10 in 1988. Bros and Kylie Minogue shared the record for most top 10 hits in 1988 with five hit singles each.

Fairground Attraction were one of a number of artists with two top-ten entries, including the number-one single "Perfect". Climie Fisher, Gloria Estefan, Morrissey, Salt 'N' Pepa and Whitney Houston were among the other artists who had multiple top 10 entries in 1988.

=== Chart debuts ===
Sixty-seven artists achieved their first top 10 single in 1988, either as a lead or featured artist. Of these, nine went on to record another hit single that year: Brother Beyond, Climie Fisher, Debbie Gibson, Fairground Attraction, Inner City, Jason Donovan, S-Express, Salt-n-Pepa and Taylor Dayne. Bomb the Bass, Tiffany and Yazz (two billed as Yazz and The Plastic Population) all had two more top 10 entries in 1988. Bros and Kylie Minogue both had four other entries in their breakthrough year.

The following table (collapsed on desktop site) does not include acts who had previously charted as part of a group and secured their first top 10 solo single.

Artist	Number of top 10s	First entry	Chart position	Other entries
Krush	1	"House Arrest"	3	—
Morris Minor and the Majors	1	"Stutter Rap (No Sleep til Bedtime)"	4	—
Joyce Sims	1	"Come into My Life"	7	—
Climie Fisher	2	"Rise to the Occasion"	10	"Love Changes (Everything)" (2)
Tiffany	3	"I Think We're Alone Now"	1	"Could've Been" (4), "I Saw Her Standing There" (8)
Bros	5	"When Will I Be Famous?"	2	"Drop the Boy" (2), "I Owe You Nothing" (1), "I Quit" (4), "Cat Among the Pigeons"/"Silent Night" (2)
Beatmasters	1	"Rok Da House"	5	—
Cookie Crew	1	"Rok Da House"	5	—
Taylor Dayne	2	"Tell It to My Heart"	3	"Prove Your Love" (8)
Debbie Gibson	2	"Shake Your Love"	7	"Foolish Beat" (9)
Kylie Minogue	5	"I Should Be So Lucky"	1	"Got to Be Certain" (2), "The Loco-Motion" (2), "Je ne sais pas pourquoi" (2), "Especially for You" (1) ^{[A]}
Jack 'N' Chill	1	"The Jack That House Built"	6	—
Bomb the Bass	3	"Beat Dis"	2	"Megablast"/"Don't Make Me Wait" (6), "Say a Little Prayer" (10)
Coldcut	1	"Doctorin' the House" ^{[B]}	6	—
Yazz & The Plastic Population	3	"Doctorin' the House" ^{[B]}	6	"The Only Way Is Up" (1), "Stand Up for Your Love Rights" (2) ^{[B]}
Vanessa Paradis	1	"Joe le taxi"	3	—
The Primitives	1	"Crash"	5	—
Aswad	1	"Don't Turn Around"	1	—
Taja Sevelle	1	"Love Is Contagious"	7	—
Eighth Wonder	1	"I'm Not Scared"	7	—
S'Express	2	"Theme from S-Express"	1	"Superfly Fly" (5)
Natalie Cole	1	"Pink Cadillac"	5	—
Pebbles	1	"Girlfriend"	8	—
Danny Wilson	1	"Mary's Prayer"	3	—
Fairground Attraction	2	"Perfect"	1	"Find My Love" (7)
Harry Enfield	1	"Loadsamoney"	4	—
Billy Bragg	1	"She's Leaving Home"	1	—
Cara Tivey	1	"She's Leaving Home"	1	—
Liverpool F.C.	1	"Anfield Rap"	3	—
Prefab Sprout	1	"The King of Rock 'n' Roll"	7	—
Aztec Camera	1	"Somewhere in My Heart"	3	—
L.A. Mix	1	"Check This Out"	6	—
Mica Paris	1	"My One Temptation"	7	—
The Timelords	1	"Doctorin' the Tardis"	1	—
Desireless	1	"Voyage, voyage"	5	—
Sabrina	1	"Boys (Summertime Love)"	3	—
Maxi Priest	1	"Wild World"	5	—
The Pasadenas	1	"Tribute (Right On)"	5	—
Salt-n-Pepa	2	"Push It"/"Tramp"	2	"Twist and Shout" (4)
Tracy Chapman	1	"Fast Car"	5	—
Glenn Medeiros	1	"Nothing's Gonna Change My Love for You"	1	—
Everything but the Girl	1	"I Don't Want to Talk About It"	3	—
The Mac Band	1	"Roses Are Red"	8	—
The McCampbell Brothers	1	"Roses Are Red"	8	—
Transvision Vamp	1	"I Want Your Love"	5	—
B.V.S.M.P.	1	"I Need You"	3	—
Breathe	1	"Hands to Heaven"	4	—
Brother Beyond	2	"The Harder I Try"	2	"He Ain't No Competition" (6)
All About Eve	1	"Martha's Harbour"	10	—
Tanita Tikaram	1	"Good Tradition"	10	—
Womack & Womack	1	"Teardrops"	3	—
Yello	1	"The Race"	7	—
Jason Donovan	2	"Nothing Can Divide Us"	5	"Especially for You" (1)
Inner City	2	"Big Fun"	8	"Good Life" (4) ^{[C]}
Bobby McFerrin	1	"Don't Worry, Be Happy"	2	—
Wee Papa Girl Rappers	1	"Wee Rule"	6	—
D Mob	1	"We Call It Acieed"	3	—
Gary Haisman	1	"We Call It Acieed"	3	—
Enya	1	"Orinoco Flow"	1	—
The Christians	1	"Harvest for the World"	8	—
Milli Vanilli	1	"Girl You Know It's True"	3	—
Robin Beck	1	"First Time"	1	—
Deacon Blue	1	"Real Gone Kid"	8	—
INXS	1	"Need You Tonight"	2	—
Maureen	1	"Say a Little Prayer"	10	—
Angry Anderson	1	"Suddenly"	3	—
Neneh Cherry	1	"Buffalo Stance" ^{[D]}	3	—

Notes

Morrissey was lead singer in the Manchester-based group The Smiths from 1982 until they disbanded in 1987. He produced his debut solo single this year, "Suedehead", which peaked at number 5, as well as the number 9-peaking follow-up "Everyday Is Like Sunday". Narada scored his only previous top 10 single, "I Shoulda Loved Ya", under his full name Narada Michael Walden.

The Timelords scored their only hit single in 1988, "Doctorin' the Tardis", under this name - they went on to future success as The KLF, one of their several other pseudonyms. Gloria Estefan was credited as a solo artist alongside her group Miami Sound Machine for the first time in 1988. She would make her official solo top 10 debut with 1989's "Don't Wanna Lose You".

=== Songs from films ===
Original songs from various films entered the top 10 throughout the year. These included "That's the Way It Is" (from Coming to America) and "A Groovy Kind of Love", "Loco in Acapulco" and "Two Hearts" (Buster).

=== Charity singles ===
The charity double-A side single by Wet Wet Wet/Billy Bragg and Cara Tivey featured cover versions of two Beatles songs, lifted from the charity compilation album Sgt. Pepper Knew My Father which was put together in aid of Childline. Wet Wet Wet recorded "With a Little Help from My Friends", while Billy Bragg and Cara Tivey collaborated on "She's Leaving Home". The single peaked at number-one on 21 May 1988 (week ending), spending four weeks at the top spot.

=== Best-selling singles ===
Cliff Richard had the best-selling single of the year with "Mistletoe and Wine". The single spent six weeks in the top 10 (including four weeks at number one), sold over 500,000 copies and was certified gold by the BPI. "The Only Way Is Up" by Yazz & The Plastic Population came in second place, selling more than 400,000 copies and losing out by around 100,000 sales. Kylie Minogue's "I Should Be So Lucky", "Especially for You" from Kylie Minogue and Jason Donovan and "I Think We're Alone Now" by Tiffany made up the top five. Singles by Glenn Medeiros, Phil Collins, The Hollies, Wet Wet Wet/Billy Bragg with Cara Tivey and Womack & Womack were also in the top ten best-selling singles of the year.

== Top-ten singles ==
Key

Symbol	Meaning
‡	Single peaked in 1987 but still in chart in 1988.
♦	Single released in 1988 but peaked in 1989.
(#)	Year-end top-ten single position and rank
Entered	The date that the single first appeared in the chart.
Peak	Highest position that the single reached in the UK Singles Chart.

Entered (week ending)	Weeks in top 10	Single	Artist	Peak	Peak reached (week ending)	Weeks at peak
Singles in 1987
7 November 1987	9	"China in Your Hand" ‡	T'Pau	1	14 November 1987	5
12 December 1987	4	"When I Fall in Love" ‡	Rick Astley	2	12 December 1987	2
12 December 1987	5	"The Way You Make Me Feel" ‡	Michael Jackson	3	12 December 1987	3
12 December 1987	6	"Always on My Mind" ‡	Pet Shop Boys	1	19 December 1987	4
12 December 1987	5	"Love Letters" ‡	Alison Moyet	4	19 December 1987	1
19 December 1987	4	"Rockin' Around the Christmas Tree" ‡ ^{[E]}^{[F]}	Comic Relief presents Mel & Kim performed by Kim Wilde & Mel Smith	3	26 December 1987	2
19 December 1987	4	"Fairytale of New York" ‡	The Pogues featuring Kirsty MacColl	2	26 December 1987	2
26 December 1987	2	"When I Fall in Love" ^{[G]}	Nat King Cole	4	2 January 1988	1
26 December 1987	7	"Heaven Is a Place on Earth"	Belinda Carlisle	1	16 January 1988	2
Singles in 1988
2 January 1988	4	"Angel Eyes (Home and Away)"	Wet Wet Wet	5	9 January 1988	1
9 January 1988	5	"House Arrest"	Krush	3	16 January 1988	1
9 January 1988	4	"Stutter Rap (No Sleep til Bedtime)"	Morris Minor and the Majors	4	16 January 1988	1
9 January 1988	3	"I Found Someone"	Cher	5	16 January 1988	1
16 January 1988	2	"All Day and All of the Night"	The Stranglers	7	16 January 1988	2
16 January 1988	4	"Sign Your Name"	Terence Trent D'arby	2	23 January 1988	1
16 January 1988	3	"Come into My Life"	Joyce Sims	7	30 January 1988	1
16 January 1988	3	"Rise to the Occasion"	Climie Fisher	10	16 January 1988	3
23 January 1988	7	"I Think We're Alone Now" (#5)	Tiffany	1	30 January 1988	3
30 January 1988	4	"When Will I Be Famous?"	Bros	2	6 February 1988	1
30 January 1988	3	"Rok da House"	Beatmasters featuring Cookie Crew	5	6 February 1988	1
30 January 1988	2	"O L'amour"	Dollar	7	6 February 1988	1
6 February 1988	5	"Tell It to My Heart"	Taylor Dayne	3	20 February 1988	1
6 February 1988	3	"Shake Your Love"	Debbie Gibson	7	13 February 1988	1
6 February 1988	3	"Candle in the Wind (Live)"	Elton John	5	13 February 1988	1
13 February 1988	9	"I Should Be So Lucky" (#3)	Kylie Minogue	1	20 February 1988	5
13 February 1988	1	"The Jack That House Built"	Jack 'N' Chill	6	13 February 1988	1
13 February 1988	6	"Get Outta My Dreams, Get into My Car"	Billy Ocean	3	27 February 1988	2
13 February 1988	3	"Say It Again"	Jermaine Stewart	7	27 February 1988	1
20 February 1988	5	"Beat Dis"	Bomb the Bass	2	27 February 1988	2
20 February 1988	1	"Valentine"	T'Pau	9	20 February 1988	1
27 February 1988	3	"Suedehead"	Morrissey	5	5 March 1988	1
27 February 1988	3	"Gimme Hope Jo'anna" ^{[H]}	Eddy Grant	7	12 March 1988	1
27 February 1988	4	"Together Forever"	Rick Astley	2	12 March 1988	2
27 February 1988	4	"Doctorin' the House"	Coldcut featuring Yazz & The Plastic Population	6	12 March 1988	1
5 March 1988	4	"Joe le taxi"	Vanessa Paradis	3	19 March 1988	1
12 March 1988	3	"Crash"	The Primitives	5	19 March 1988	1
12 March 1988	1	"That's the Way it Is"	Mel and Kim	10	12 March 1988	1
19 March 1988	5	"Don't Turn Around"	Aswad	1	26 March 1988	2
19 March 1988	2	"Ship of Fools"	Erasure	6	19 March 1988	1
19 March 1988	1	"Love Is Contagious"	Taja Sevelle	7	19 March 1988	1
26 March 1988	5	"Drop the Boy"	Bros	2	26 March 1988	4
26 March 1988	3	"Can I Play with Madness"	Iron Maiden	3	2 April 1988	1
26 March 1988	4	"Could've Been"	Tiffany	4	2 April 1988	3
26 March 1988	2	"Never"/"These Dreams"	Heart	8	26 March 1988	1
26 March 1988	1	"I Get Weak"	Belinda Carlisle	10	26 March 1988	1
2 April 1988	2	"Stay on These Roads"	A-ha	5	2 April 1988	1
2 April 1988	3	"Cross My Broken Heart"	Sinitta	6	2 April 1988	3
2 April 1988	6	"Heart"	Pet Shop Boys	1	9 April 1988	3
2 April 1988	3	"I'm Not Scared"	Eighth Wonder	7	16 April 1988	1
9 April 1988	4	"Love Changes (Everything)"	Climie Fisher	2	23 April 1988	1
16 April 1988	3	"Everywhere"	Fleetwood Mac	4	23 April 1988	1
16 April 1988	1	"Prove Your Love"	Taylor Dayne	8	16 April 1988	1
16 April 1988	5	"Who's Leaving Who"	Hazell Dean	4	30 April 1988	2
23 April 1988	6	"Theme from S-Express"	S'Express	1	30 April 1988	2
23 April 1988	3	"Pink Cadillac"	Natalie Cole	5	23 April 1988	1
23 April 1988	5	"I Want You Back"	Bananarama	5	30 April 1988	2
23 April 1988	1	"Girlfriend"	Pebbles	8	23 April 1988	1
23 April 1988	4	"I Want You Back '88" ^{[I]}	Michael Jackson with The Jackson 5	8	7 May 1988	1
30 April 1988	4	"Mary's Prayer"	Danny Wilson	3	30 April 1988	2
30 April 1988	2	"One More Try"	George Michael	8	30 April 1988	1
7 May 1988	6	"Perfect"	Fairground Attraction	1	14 May 1988	1
7 May 1988	5	"Blue Monday 1988" ^{[J]}	New Order	3	14 May 1988	1
14 May 1988	2	"Loadsamoney"	Harry Enfield	4	14 May 1988	1
14 May 1988	7	"With a Little Help from My Friends"/"She's Leaving Home" (#9) ^{[K]}	Wet Wet Wet/Billy Bragg & Cara Tivey	1	21 May 1988	4
14 May 1988	1	"Alphabet St."	Prince	9	14 May 1988	1
21 May 1988	2	"Anfield Rap" ^{[L]}	Liverpool F.C.	3	21 May 1988	1
21 May 1988	5	"Got to Be Certain"	Kylie Minogue	2	28 May 1988	3
21 May 1988	2	"Divine Emotions"	Narada	8	21 May 1988	1
28 May 1988	3	"Circle in the Sand"	Belinda Carlisle	4	4 June 1988	1
28 May 1988	2	"The King of Rock 'n' Roll"	Prefab Sprout	7	28 May 1988	2
28 May 1988	4	"Somewhere in My Heart"	Aztec Camera	3	11 June 1988	1
4 June 1988	2	"Check This Out"	L.A. Mix	6	4 June 1988	1
4 June 1988	2	"My One Temptation"	Mica Paris	7	11 June 1988	1
4 June 1988	1	"Love Will Save the Day"	Whitney Houston	10	4 June 1988	1
11 June 1988	4	"Doctorin' the Tardis" ^{[J]}	The Timelords	1	18 June 1988	1
11 June 1988	3	"Voyage, voyage"	Desireless	5	11 June 1988	2
11 June 1988	2	"I Saw Him Standing There"	Tiffany	8	11 June 1988	1
18 June 1988	5	"I Owe You Nothing"	Bros	1	25 June 1988	2
18 June 1988	5	"Boys (Summertime Love)"	Sabrina	3	25 June 1988	2
18 June 1988	4	"Wild World"	Maxi Priest	5	25 June 1988	1
18 June 1988	1	"Everyday Is Like Sunday"	Morrissey	9	18 June 1988	1
25 June 1988	5	"The Twist (Yo Twist)"	The Fat Boys with Chubby Checker	2	2 July 1988	2
25 June 1988	3	"Tribute (Right On)"	The Pasadenas	5	2 July 1988	1
25 June 1988	4	"In the Air Tonight ('88 Remix)" ^{[N]}	Phil Collins	4	2 July 1988	1
25 June 1988	5	"Breakfast in Bed"	UB40 featuring Chrissie Hynde	6	2 July 1988	1
2 July 1988	7	"Push It"/"Tramp"	Salt-n-Pepa	2	16 July 1988	3
2 July 1988	4	"Fast Car"	Tracy Chapman	5	16 July 1988	1
9 July 1988	6	"Nothing's Gonna Change My Love for You" (#6)	Glenn Medeiros	1	9 July 1988	4
16 July 1988	4	"I Don't Want to Talk About It"	Everything but the Girl	3	23 July 1988	2
16 July 1988	3	"Roses Are Red"	The Mac Band featuring The McCampbell Brothers	8	23 July 1988	2
23 July 1988	3	"Dirty Diana"	Michael Jackson	4	23 July 1988	2
23 July 1988	4	"I Want Your Love"	Transvision Vamp	5	23 July 1988	2
23 July 1988	2	"Foolish Beat"	Debbie Gibson	9	23 July 1988	2
30 July 1988	5	"You Came"	Kim Wilde	3	13 August 1988	1
30 July 1988	4	"Superfly Guy"	S'Express	5	13 August 1988	1
30 July 1988	9	"The Only Way Is Up" (#2)	Yazz & The Plastic Population	1	6 August 1988	5
6 August 1988	6	"The Loco-Motion"	Kylie Minogue	2	6 August 1988	4
6 August 1988	5	"I Need You"	B.V.S.M.P.	3	20 August 1988	1
13 August 1988	3	"The Evil That Men Do"	Iron Maiden	5	20 August 1988	1
13 August 1988	4	"Find My Love"	Fairground Attraction	7	20 August 1988	2
20 August 1988	4	"Hands to Heaven"	Breathe	4	27 August 1988	2
20 August 1988	5	"The Harder I Try"	Brother Beyond	2	3 September 1988	2
20 August 1988	1	"Martha's Harbour"	All About Eve	10	20 August 1988	1
27 August 1988	3	"My Love"	Julio Iglesias featuring Stevie Wonder	5	3 September 1988	1
27 August 1988	1	"Good Tradition"	Tanita Tikaram	10	27 August 1988	1
3 September 1988	3	"Megablast"/"Don't Make Me Wait"	Bomb the Bass	6	3 September 1988	2
3 September 1988	8	"Teardrops" (#10)	Womack & Womack	3	17 September 1988	2
3 September 1988	7	"A Groovy Kind of Love" (#7)	Phil Collins	1	10 September 1988	2
10 September 1988	6	"He Ain't Heavy, He's My Brother" (#8) ^{[O]}	The Hollies	1	24 September 1988	2
10 September 1988	3	"The Race"	Yello	7	24 September 1988	1
17 September 1988	2	"I Quit"	Bros	4	17 September 1988	1
17 September 1988	4	"Lovely Day (Sunshine Mix)" ^{[P]}	Bill Withers	4	24 September 1988	1
17 September 1988	1	"Anything for You"	Gloria Estefan & Miami Sound Machine	10	17 September 1988	1
24 September 1988	4	"Nothing Can Divide Us"	Jason Donovan	5	24 September 1988	1
24 September 1988	3	"Big Fun"	Inner City	8	24 September 1988	1
24 September 1988	3	"Domino Dancing"	Pet Shop Boys	7	1 October 1988	1
1 October 1988	3	"Desire"	U2	1	8 October 1988	1
1 October 1988	6	"One Moment in Time" ^{[Q]}	Whitney Houston	1	15 October 1988	2
1 October 1988	4	"She Wants to Dance with Me"	Rick Astley	6	15 October 1988	1
15 October 1988	3	"Don't Worry, Be Happy"	Bobby McFerrin	2	22 October 1988	1
15 October 1988	4	"A Little Respect"	Erasure	4	22 October 1988	1
15 October 1988	4	"Wee Rule"	Wee Papa Girl Rappers	6	22 October 1988	1
22 October 1988	3	"We Call It Acieed"	D Mob featuring Gary Haisman	3	22 October 1988	1
22 October 1988	5	"Orinoco Flow"	Enya	1	29 October 1988	3
22 October 1988	2	"Never Trust a Stranger"	Kim Wilde	7	22 October 1988	1
22 October 1988	2	"Harvest for the World"	The Christians	8	29 October 1988	1
29 October 1988	5	"Je ne sais pas pourquoi"	Kylie Minogue	2	29 October 1988	3
29 October 1988	4	"Girl You Know It's True"	Milli Vanilli	3	5 November 1988	1
5 November 1988	4	"Stand Up for Your Love Rights"	Yazz	2	19 November 1988	1
5 November 1988	2	"Kiss"	Art of Noise featuring Tom Jones	5	5 November 1988	1
5 November 1988	3	"She Makes My Day"	Robert Palmer	6	12 November 1988	1
12 November 1988	5	"First Time" ^{[R]}	Robin Beck	1	19 November 1988	3
12 November 1988	3	"He Ain't No Competition"	Brother Beyond	6	19 November 1988	1
12 November 1988	1	"1-2-3"	Gloria Estefan & Miami Sound Machine	9	12 November 1988	1
12 November 1988	3	"Real Gone Kid"	Deacon Blue	8	26 November 1988	1
19 November 1988	3	"Need You Tonight"	INXS	2	26 November 1988	1
19 November 1988	4	"Missing You"	Chris de Burgh	3	26 November 1988	2
26 November 1988	2	"Twist and Shout"	Salt-n-Pepa	4	26 November 1988	1
26 November 1988	1	"The Clairvoyant"	Iron Maiden	6	26 November 1988	1
26 November 1988	2	"Left to My Own Devices"	Pet Shop Boys	4	3 December 1988	1
3 December 1988	6	"Cat Among the Pigeons"/"Silent Night"	Bros	2	3 December 1988	1
3 December 1988	5	"Two Hearts"	Phil Collins	6	3 December 1988	2
3 December 1988	6	"Mistletoe and Wine" (#1)	Cliff Richard	1	10 December 1988	4
3 December 1988	2	"Smooth Criminal"	Michael Jackson	8	3 December 1988	1
3 December 1988	1	"Say a Little Prayer"	Bomb the Bass featuring Maureen	10	3 December 1988	1
10 December 1988	9	"Especially for You" ♦ (#4)	Kylie Minogue & Jason Donovan	1	7 January 1989	3
10 December 1988	6	"Suddenly"	Angry Anderson	3	10 December 1988	3
10 December 1988	9	"Crackers International (EP)" ♦	Erasure	2	7 January 1989	3
10 December 1988	2	"Take Me to Your Heart"	Rick Astley	8	10 December 1988	2
17 December 1988	6	"Good Life" ♦	Inner City	4	7 January 1989	2
17 December 1988	4	"Burning Bridges"	Status Quo	5	31 December 1988	1
17 December 1988	2	"Angel of Harlem"	U2	9	24 December 1988	1
24 December 1988	1	"Downtown '88" ^{[S]}	Petula Clark	10	24 December 1988	1
31 December 1988	5	"Buffalo Stance" ♦	Neneh Cherry	3	14 January 1989	2
31 December 1988	3	"Loco in Acapulco" ♦	Four Tops	7	7 January 1989	2

== Entries by artist ==
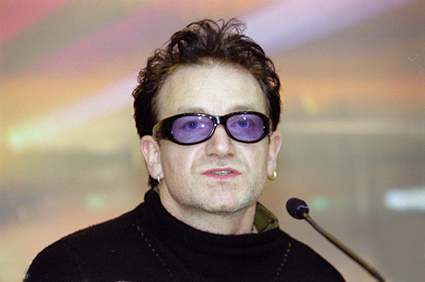
U2 (frontman Bono pictured in 2000) scored their first UK number-one single this year with "Desire", taken from the album Rattle and Hum.

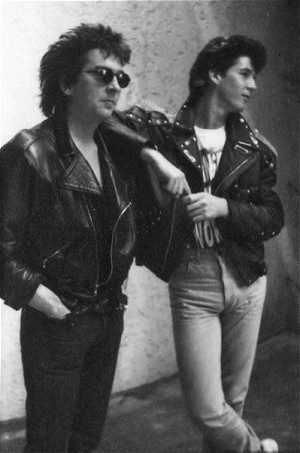
Climie Fisher had two UK top singles in 1988, including their best known song, "Love Changes (Everything)", which reached number two in April.

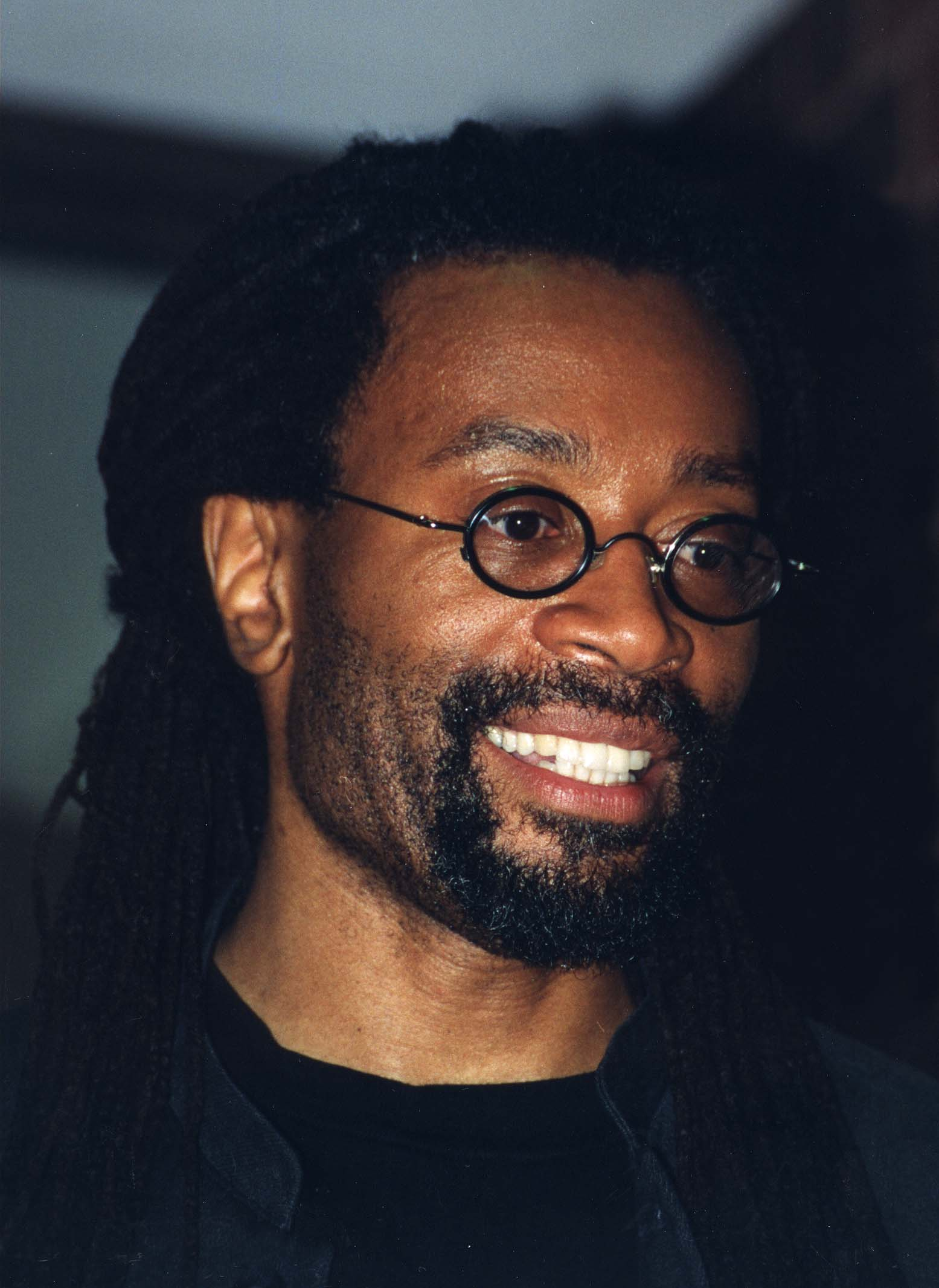
Bobby McFerrin (pictured in 1994) became a one-hit wonder in the UK this year with his song "Don't Worry, Be Happy", which peaked at number two in October.

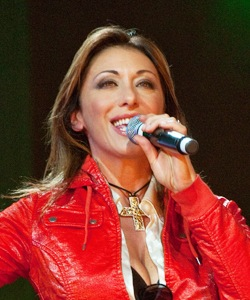
Italian pop singer Sabrina (pictured in 2010) reached number three in June 1988 with her one and only UK top 10 hit, "Boys (Summertime Love)".

The following table shows artists who achieved two or more top 10 entries in 1988, including singles that reached their peak in 1987 or 1989. The figures include both main artists and featured artists, while appearances on ensemble charity records are also counted for each artist.

Entries	Artist	Weeks	Singles
5	Bros	21	"Cat Among the Pigeons"/"Silent Night", "Drop the Boy", "I Owe You Nothing", "I Quit", "When Will I Be Famous?"
5	Kylie Minogue ^{[T]}	29	"Especially for You", "Got to Be Certain", "I Should Be So Lucky", "Je ne sais pas pourquoi", "The Loco-Motion"
4	Michael Jackson ^{[U]}^{[V]}	11	"Dirty Diana", "I Want You Back '88", "Smooth Criminal", "The Way You Make Me Feel"
4	Pet Shop Boys ^{[U]}	14	"Always on My Mind", "Domino Dancing", "Heart", "Left to My Own Devices"
4	Rick Astley ^{[U]}	11	"She Wants to Dance with Me", "Take Me to Your Heart", "Together Forever", "When I Fall in Love"
3	Belinda Carlisle ^{[W]}	10	"Circle in the Sand", "Heaven Is a Place on Earth", "I Get Weak"
3	Bomb the Bass	9	"Beat Dis", "Megablast"/"Don't Make Me Wait", "Say a Little Prayer"
3	Erasure ^{[T]}	10	"A Little Respect", "Crackers International (EP)", "Ship of Fools"
3	Iron Maiden	7	"Can I Play with Madness", "The Clairvoyant", "The Evil That Men Do"
3	Kim Wilde ^{[U]}	9	"Never Trust a Stranger", "Rockin' Around the Christmas Tree", "You Came"
3	Phil Collins	16	"A Groovy Kind of Love", "In the Air Tonight ('88 Remix)", "Two Hearts"
3	Tiffany	13	"Could've Been", "I Saw Him Standing There", "I Think We're Alone Now"
3	Yazz ^{[X]}	17	"Doctorin' the House", "Stand Up for Your Love Rights", "The Only Way Is Up"
2	Brother Beyond	8	"He Ain't No Competition", "The Harder I Try"
2	Climie Fisher	7	"Love Changes (Everything)", "Rise to the Occasion"
2	Debbie Gibson	5	"Foolish Beat", "Shake Your Love"
2	Fairground Attraction	10	"Find My Love", "Perfect"
2	Gloria Estefan	2	"1-2-3", "Anything for You"
2	Inner City ^{[T]}	6	"Big Fun", "Good Life"
2	Jason Donovan ^{[T]}	8	"Especially for You", "Nothing Can Divide Us"
2	Miami Sound Machine	2	"1-2-3", "Anything for You"
2	Morrissey	4	"Everyday Is Like Sunday", "Suedehead"
2	S'Express	10	"Superfly Guy", "Theme from S-Express"
2	Salt-n-Pepa	9	"Push It"/"Tramp", "Twist and Shout"
2	T'Pau ^{[U]}	2	"China in Your Hand", "Valentine"
2	Taylor Dayne	6	"Prove Your Love", "Tell It to My Heart"
2	U2	5	"Angel of Harlem", "Desire"
2	Wet Wet Wet	11	"Angel Eyes (Home and Away)", "With a Little Help from My Friends"
2	Whitney Houston	7	"Love Will Save the Day", "One Moment in Time"

== Notes ==
- ^{a} "Especially for You" reached its peak of number-one on 7 January 1989 (week ending).
- ^{b} "The Only Way Is Up" and "Doctorin' the House" were both credited to Yazz & The Plastic Population, while "Stand Up for Your Love Rights" simply to Yazz.
- ^{c} "Good Life" reached its peak of number four on 7 January 1989 (week ending).
- ^{d} "Buffalo Stance" reached its peak of number three on 14 January 1989 (week ending).
- ^{e} Comedian Mel Smith and singer Kim Wilde parodied their namesakes, the duo Mel and Kim, for the Comic Relief cover of "Rockin' Around the Christmas Tree". The song was recorded under the identical name, Mel & Kim.
- ^{f} Released as the official single for Comic Relief in 1987.
- ^{g} "When I Fall in Love" (Nat King Cole version) originally peaked at number 2 on its initial release in 1957.
- ^{h} "Gimme Hope Jo'anna" was released as a protest song against apartheid in South Africa. It was banned by the South African government when it was first recorded.
- ^{i} "I Want You Back" originally peaked at number 2 upon its initial release in 1970. The song was remixed and re-released as "I Want You Back '88" in 1988.
- ^{j} "Blue Monday" originally peaked at number 9 upon its initial release in 1983. The song was remixed and re-released as "Blue Monday 1988" in 1988.
- ^{k} "With a Little Help from My Friends" and "She's Leaving Home" were recorded for the charity compilation album Sgt. Pepper Knew My Father, which was raising money for Childline. They were released as a double-A side single, with Wet Wet Wet responsible for the former and Billy Bragg with Cara Tivey the latter.
- ^{l} "Anfield Rap" was released by Liverpool F.C. to celebrate reaching the FA Cup Final in 1988.
- ^{m} "Doctorin' the Tardis" was a mash-up of the Doctor Who theme tune with "Rock and Roll (Part Two)" by Gary Glitter. It also contained a sample of "Blockbuster!" by Sweet.
- ^{n} "In the Air Tonight" originally peaked at number 2 upon its initial release in 1981. The song was remixed and re-released in 1988.
- ^{o} "He Ain't Heavy, He's My Brother" originally peaked at number 3 upon its initial release in 1969. It was re-released in 1988 after being used in a television advertising campaign for Miller Lite beer.
- ^{p} "Lovely Day" originally peaked at number 7 upon its initial release in 1978. The song was remixed and re-released as "Lovely Day (Sunshine Mix)" in 1988.
- ^{q} "One Moment in Time" was the official single for the Summer Olympics in 1988.
- ^{r} "First Time" was used in a television advertising campaign for Coca-Cola in 1987.
- ^{s} "Downtown" originally peaked at number 2 upon its initial release in 1964. The song was remixed and re-released (without Petula Clark's permission) as "Downtown '88" in 1988.
- ^{t} Figure includes single that peaked in 1989.
- ^{u} Figure includes single that peaked in 1987.
- ^{v} Figure includes a top 10 hit with the group The Jackson 5.
- ^{w} Figure includes single that first charted in 1987 but peaked in 1988.
- ^{x} Figure includes appearance on Coldcut's "Doctorin' the House".

== See also ==
- 1988 in British music
- List of number-one singles from the 1980s (UK)
