= 1988 in British music =

This is a summary of 1988 in music in the United Kingdom, including the official charts from that year.

== Summary ==
The growing popularity of house music was evident in the charts by the start of 1988, with many songs of this genre becoming big hits, such as "House Arrest" by Krush, "Beat Dis" by Bomb the Bass and "Rok da House" by The Beatmasters. Acid house band S'Express had two Top 10 hits this year including a number 1 in April with the song "Theme from S'Express", but the biggest dance hit of the year came from London singer Yazz, who had first had a big hit with producers Coldcut on the song "Doctorin' the House". Still with Coldcut, but now with her name billed as the lead artist, her song "The Only Way Is Up" topped the chart for five weeks, becoming the second biggest-selling single of the year, and paved the way for a successful solo career, including the follow-up "Stand Up for Your Love Rights", which hit No.2 in October.

One of the biggest successes of the year was 19-year-old Kylie Minogue, well known to the public from her role in the Australian soap opera Neighbours, which had been airing on the BBC since 1986. The popularity of "girl next door" Minogue and her on-screen character Charlene Mitchell ensured chart success. Signed to the production trio Stock Aitken Waterman, her debut international song "I Should Be So Lucky" was number 1 for five weeks, and all of her other solo releases this year – "Got to Be Certain", "The Loco-Motion" and "Je ne sais pas pourquoi" – reached number 2. Her album Kylie was also number 1 for six weeks, the biggest-selling album of the year and the fifth best-selling album of the entire decade. All Kylie's hits were produced by Stock Aitken Waterman who continued to score hit after hit this year. The production powerhouse also scored Top 10s with Mel and Kim ("That's The Way It Is", No.10, February) Sinitta ("Cross My Broken Heart", No.6, March), Rick Astley ("Together Forever", No.2, March and "Take Me to Your Heart", No.8, November), Bananarama ("I Want You Back", No.5, April), Hazell Dean ("Who's Leaving Who", No.4, April), Brother Beyond ("The Harder I Try", No.2, August and "He Ain't No Competition", No.6, November). In September, another star from Neighbours – Minogue's co-star Jason Donovan – debuted with his Stock Aitken Waterman-produced hit "Nothing Can Divide Us", which reached number 5 and he would go on to outsell even Kylie the following year.

Popular teenage acts other than Minogue to emerge this year included the American singer Tiffany who scored three Top 10 hits including the No.1 "I Think We're Alone Now" while fellow American teenage star Debbie Gibson also crossed over to the British Charts and had four Top 20 hits. Gibson's biggest hit was the 1980s-compilation staple "Shake Your Love", which reached number 7 in January. Meanwhile, from Italy came Sabrina whose infamous appearances in skimpy swimsuits became tabloid-fodder throughout the year as her pan-European smash hit "Boys (Summertime Love)" hit number 3 in June and the Stock Aitken Waterman-produced follow-up "All of Me" peaked at number 25 three months later.

New British boyband Bros took five singles into the Top 5 this year including "When Will I Be Famous?" and their only number 1 "I Owe You Nothing", a re-issue of their first single originally released in 1987. Wet Wet Wet scored the first number 1 of their long run of hits with a cover of "With a Little Help from My Friends", which held the top position for 3 weeks.

Also making her chart debut this year was nineteen-year-old Tanita Tikaram, who launched her career with the critically acclaimed album Ancient Heart, containing the Top 10 hit "Good Tradition" and the intriguing "Twist in My Sobriety", which peaked at number 22 in October. Eddi Reader also rose to prominence during 1988 as the lead-singer of Fairground Attraction. The band made number 1 with the song "Perfect" and followed it with another Top 10 hit, "Find My Love", and number 2 album, The First of a Million Kisses.

Making chart comebacks after long-absences were Cher, re-launching her music career with "I Found Someone", a number 5 hit written and produced by Michael Bolton. Belinda Carlisle revived her career this year with three Top 10s including the number 1 "Heaven Is a Place on Earth" while Kim Wilde scored a career-best three successive Top 10s with "You Came" (No.3), "Never Trust a Stranger (No.7) and "Four Letter Word" (No.6). Pop duo Dollar scored their ninth and final Top 20 hit with comeback hit "Oh L'amour", a cover of an early Erasure single, which made number 7 in April, and also making a chart comeback was the song "A Groovy Kind of Love", originally a hit in 1965 for The Mindbenders, it hit number 1 in September for Phil Collins, taken from the film Buster in which Collins also starred.

Some of the more unusual hits of the year included a remix of the theme tune from the popular television series Doctor Who, by "The Timelords", who would go on to have huge success in the early 1990s under the name The KLF. Their song "Doctorin' the TARDIS" (a play on Coldcut's "Doctorin' the House") was number 1 for a week in June. A television advertisement for Miller Lite beer used the 1969 song "He Ain't Heavy, He's My Brother" by The Hollies, which became a number 1 in September 19 years after its original release, and an advert for Coca-Cola gave Robin Beck a number 1 with the ballad "First Time". Film and television actress Patsy Kensit, a teenager in 1988, also reached the Top 10 this year in the band Eighth Wonder. Their Pet Shop Boys–produced UK debut "I'm Not Scared" slowly climbed up the Top 40 and peaked at number 7 in May. The band were more popular in Italy and Japan where they scored several number 1 hits.

The race for Christmas number one was a battle between Cliff Richard, with a career stretching back to the 1950s and his seasonal song "Mistletoe and Wine", and new star Kylie Minogue with "Especially for You", a duet with her Neighbours co-star Jason Donovan released to coincide with their characters' on-screen wedding. Richard won the battle with the biggest-selling song of the year, but "Especially for You" climbed to number 1 in the new year of 1989, eventually selling just short of 1 million copies.

1988 saw Radio 1 start to broadcast on FM on a full time basis across much of the UK when five major transmitters begin radiating Radio 1 on FM for the first time. Previously, Radio 1 had been available on FM for only approximately 25 hours per week, when it "borrowed" BBC Radio 2's FM frequency at certain points of the day.

New classical works by British composers included oboe and trumpet concertos from Peter Maxwell Davies and Michael Finnissy's Red Earth for orchestra. Devotional works included Nicholas Jackson's Variations on ‘Praise to the Lord, the Almighty’ and John Tavener's The Akathist of Thanksgiving. Russian pianist Evgeny Kissin made his Proms debut during the 1988 season, whilst Sir Andrew Davis gave up his role as conductor of the Toronto Symphony Orchestra to become director of Glyndebourne.

== Events ==
- February 8 – Kenney Jones performs for the last time as the regular drummer for The Who at the British Phonographic Industry awards ceremony, where the band receives the Lifetime Achievement Award.
- 15 February – The first public performance of Anthony Payne’s realisation of Elgar’s Symphony No. 3 is given by the BBC Symphony Orchestra, conducted by Andrew Davis at the Royal Festival Hall.
- 10 March – Andy Gibb dies five days after his 30th birthday at John Radcliffe Hospital in Oxford of myocarditis, an inflammation of the heart muscle caused by a recent viral infection and exacerbated by his years of cocaine abuse.
- 11 March – The first performance of Richard Rodney Bennett‘s Marimba Concerto takes place at Muhlenberg College in Allentown, Pennsylvania, performed by the Lehigh Chamber Orchestra, conducted by Donald Spieth.
- 16 April – A concert performance of the opera Beatrice Cenci by Berthold Goldschmidt takes place at the Queen Elizabeth Hall, London, 37 years after it won first prize in the Festival of Britain opera competition.
- 30 April – The Eurovision Song Contest, held in the RDS Simmonscourt Pavilion, Dublin, is won by Celine Dion, representing Switzerland. The UK entry, "Go", sung by Scott Fitzgerald, finishes in second place after leading for most of the judging.

== Charts ==
=== Number-one singles ===
Chart date (week ending)	Song	Artist(s)	Weeks	Sales
2 January	"Always on My Mind"	Pet Shop Boys	2	97,189
9 January	"Always on My Mind"	Pet Shop Boys	2	55,947
16 January	"Heaven Is a Place on Earth"	Belinda Carlisle	2	67,303
23 January	"Heaven Is a Place on Earth"	Belinda Carlisle	2	83,538
30 January	"I Think We're Alone Now"	Tiffany	3	81,413
6 February	"I Think We're Alone Now"	Tiffany	3	97,988
13 February	"I Think We're Alone Now"	Tiffany	3	74,987
20 February	"I Should Be So Lucky"	Kylie Minogue	5	92,701
27 February	"I Should Be So Lucky"	Kylie Minogue	5	110,007
5 March	"I Should Be So Lucky"	Kylie Minogue	5	87,975
12 March	"I Should Be So Lucky"	Kylie Minogue	5	65,841
19 March	"I Should Be So Lucky"	Kylie Minogue	5	48,280
26 March	"Don't Turn Around"	Aswad	2	48,807
2 April	"Don't Turn Around"	Aswad	2	63,665
9 April	"Heart"	Pet Shop Boys	3	44,863
16 April	"Heart"	Pet Shop Boys	3	55,301
23 April	"Heart"	Pet Shop Boys	3	48,399
30 April	"Theme from S-Express"	S'Express	2	58,361
7 May	"Theme from S-Express"	S'Express	2	61,183
14 May	"Perfect"	Fairground Attraction	1	65,739
21 May	"With a Little Help from My Friends" / "She's Leaving Home"	Wet Wet Wet / Billy Bragg	4	88,587
28 May	"With a Little Help from My Friends" / "She's Leaving Home"	Wet Wet Wet / Billy Bragg	4	107,083
4 June	"With a Little Help from My Friends" / "She's Leaving Home"	Wet Wet Wet / Billy Bragg	4	64,923
11 June	"With a Little Help from My Friends" / "She's Leaving Home"	Wet Wet Wet / Billy Bragg	4	47,328
18 June	"Doctorin' the Tardis"	The Timelords	1	43,605
25 June	"I Owe You Nothing"	Bros	2	56,457
2 July	"I Owe You Nothing"	Bros	2	50,150
9 July	"Nothing's Gonna Change My Love For You"	Glenn Medeiros	4	74,137
16 July	"Nothing's Gonna Change My Love For You"	Glenn Medeiros	4	131,002
23 July	"Nothing's Gonna Change My Love For You"	Glenn Medeiros	4	93,415
30 July	"Nothing's Gonna Change My Love For You"	Glenn Medeiros	4	63,274
6 August	"The Only Way Is Up"	Yazz and the Plastic Population	5	61,183
13 August	"The Only Way Is Up"	Yazz and the Plastic Population	5	122,145
20 August	"The Only Way Is Up"	Yazz and the Plastic Population	5	103,989
27 August	"The Only Way Is Up"	Yazz and the Plastic Population	5	88,995
3 September	"The Only Way Is Up"	Yazz and the Plastic Population	5	67,864
10 September	"A Groovy Kind of Love"	Phil Collins	2	57,681
17 September	"A Groovy Kind of Love"	Phil Collins	2	112,965
24 September	"He Ain't Heavy, He's My Brother"	The Hollies	2	98,192
1 October	"He Ain't Heavy, He's My Brother"	The Hollies	2	81,226
8 October	"Desire"	U2	1	62,118
15 October	"One Moment in Time"	Whitney Houston	2	47,855
22 October	"One Moment in Time"	Whitney Houston	2	63,716
29 October	"Orinoco Flow (Sail Away)"	Enya	3	58,310
5 November	"Orinoco Flow (Sail Away)"	Enya	3	71,604
12 November	"Orinoco Flow (Sail Away)"	Enya	3	47,617
19 November	"First Time"	Robin Beck	3	58,701
26 November	"First Time"	Robin Beck	3	76,874
3 December	"First Time"	Robin Beck	3	55,029
10 December	"Mistletoe and Wine"	Cliff Richard	4	128,418
17 December	"Mistletoe and Wine"	Cliff Richard	4	160,973
24 December	"Mistletoe and Wine"	Cliff Richard	4	174,148
31 December	"Mistletoe and Wine"	Cliff Richard	4	218,943

=== Number-one albums ===
Chart date (week ending)	Album	Artist
2 January	Now 10	Various Artists
9 January	Now 10	Various Artists
16 January	Popped In Souled Out	Wet Wet Wet
23 January	Turn Back the Clock	Johnny Hates Jazz
30 January	Introducing the Hardline According to Terence Trent D'Arby	Terence Trent D'Arby
6 February	Introducing the Hardline According to Terence Trent D'Arby	Terence Trent D'Arby
13 February	Introducing the Hardline According to Terence Trent D'Arby	Terence Trent D'Arby
20 February	Introducing the Hardline According to Terence Trent D'Arby	Terence Trent D'Arby
27 February	Introducing the Hardline According to Terence Trent D'Arby	Terence Trent D'Arby
5 March	Introducing the Hardline According to Terence Trent D'Arby	Terence Trent D'Arby
12 March	Introducing the Hardline According to Terence Trent D'Arby	Terence Trent D'Arby
19 March	Introducing the Hardline According to Terence Trent D'Arby	Terence Trent D'Arby
26 March	Viva Hate	Morrissey
2 April	Now 11	Various Artists
9 April	Now 11	Various Artists
16 April	Now 11	Various Artists
23 April	Seventh Son of a Seventh Son	Iron Maiden
30 April	The Innocents	Erasure
7 May	Tango in the Night	Fleetwood Mac
14 May	Tango in the Night	Fleetwood Mac
21 May	Lovesexy	Prince
28 May	Tango in the Night	Fleetwood Mac
4 June	Nite Flite	Various Artists
11 June	Nite Flite	Various Artists
18 June	Nite Flite	Various Artists
25 June	Nite Flite	Various Artists
2 July	Tracy Chapman	Tracy Chapman
9 July	Tracy Chapman	Tracy Chapman
16 July	Tracy Chapman	Tracy Chapman
23 July	Now 12	Various Artists
30 July	Now 12	Various Artists
6 August	Now 12	Various Artists
13 August	Now 12	Various Artists
20 August	Now 12	Various Artists
27 August	Kylie	Kylie Minogue
3 September	Kylie	Kylie Minogue
10 September	Kylie	Kylie Minogue
17 September	Kylie	Kylie Minogue
24 September	Hot City Nights	Various Artists
1 October	New Jersey	Bon Jovi
8 October	New Jersey	Bon Jovi
15 October	Flying Colours	Chris de Burgh
22 October	Rattle and Hum	U2
29 October	Money for Nothing	Dire Straits
5 November	Money for Nothing	Dire Straits
12 November	Money for Nothing	Dire Straits
19 November	Kylie	Kylie Minogue
26 November	Kylie	Kylie Minogue
3 December	Now 13	Various Artists
10 December	Now 13	Various Artists
17 December	Now 13	Various Artists
24 December	Private Collection: 1979–1988	Cliff Richard
31 December	Private Collection: 1979–1988	Cliff Richard

== Year end charts ==
=== Best-selling singles of 1988 ===
No.	Title	Artist	Peak position
1	"Mistletoe and Wine"	Cliff Richard	1
2	"The Only Way Is Up"	Yazz and the Plastic Population	1
3	"I Should Be So Lucky"	Kylie Minogue	1
4	"Especially for You"	Kylie Minogue & Jason Donovan	2 (Note: Reached number 1 in 1989)
5	"I Think We're Alone Now"	Tiffany	1
6	"Nothing's Gonna Change My Love for You"	Glenn Medeiros	1
7	"A Groovy Kind of Love"	Phil Collins	1
8	"He Ain't Heavy, He's My Brother"	The Hollies	1
9	"With a Little Help from My Friends"/"She's Leaving Home"	Wet Wet Wet/Billy Bragg with Cara Tivey	1
10	"Teardrops"	Womack & Womack	3
11	"The Loco-Motion"	Kylie Minogue	2
12	"First Time"	Robin Beck	1
13	"Perfect"	Fairground Attraction	1
14	"One Moment in Time"	Whitney Houston	1
15	"Push It"/"Tramp"	Salt-n-Pepa	2
16	"Suddenly"	Angry Anderson	3
17	"Heaven Is a Place on Earth"	Belinda Carlisle	1
18	"Orinoco Flow"	Enya	1
19	"Theme From S-Express"	S-Express	1
20	"Je ne sais pas pourquoi"	Kylie Minogue	2
21	"Got to Be Certain"	Kylie Minogue	2
22	"The Harder I Try"	Brother Beyond	2
23	"Tell It to My Heart"	Taylor Dayne	3
24	"Crackers International" (EP)	Erasure	2
25	"I Owe You Nothing"	Bros	1
26	"Heart"	Pet Shop Boys	1
27	"Get Outta My Dreams, Get into My Car"	Billy Ocean	3
28	"Don't Turn Around"	Aswad	1
29	"Nothing Can Divide Us"	Jason Donovan	5
30	"Beat Dis"	Bomb the Bass	2
31	"Drop the Boy"	Bros	2
32	"Sign Your Name"	Terence Trent D'Arby	2
33	"The Twist (Yo Twist)"	The Fat Boys & Chubby Checker	2
34	"When Will I Be Famous?"	Bros	2
35	"Boys (Summertime Love)"	Sabrina	3
36	"House Arrest"	Krush	3
37	"You Came"	Kim Wilde	3
38	"Lovely Day" (Sunshine Mix)	Bill Withers	4
39	"I Need You"	B.V.S.M.P.	3
40	"Girl You Know It's True"	Milli Vanilli	3
41	"Stand Up for Your Love Rights"	Yazz	2
42	"Cat Among the Pigeons"/"Silent Night"	Bros	2
43	"Don't Worry, Be Happy"	Bobby McFerrin	2
44	"Hands to Heaven"	Breathe	4
45	"Desire"	U2	1
46	"A Little Respect"	Erasure	4
47	"Big Fun"	Inner City	8
48	"Love Changes (Everything)" (remix)	Climie Fisher	2
49	"Together Forever"	Rick Astley	2
50	"Missing You"	Chris de Burgh	3

=== Best-selling albums of 1988 ===
Position	Title	Artist	Peak Position
1	Kylie	Kylie Minogue	1
2	Private Collection: 1979–1988	Cliff Richard	1
3	Bad	Michael Jackson	2 (Note: Reached number 1 in 1987)
4	Push	Bros	2
5	Now 13	Various Artists	1
6	Popped In Souled Out	Wet Wet Wet	1
7	Tracy Chapman	Tracy Chapman	1
8	Introducing the Hardline According to Terence Trent D'Arby	Terence Trent D'Arby	1
9	Tango in the Night	Fleetwood Mac	1
10	Rattle and Hum	U2	1
11	Money for Nothing	Dire Straits	1
12	Now 12	Various Artists	1
13	Now 11	Various Artists	1
14	Dirty Dancing	Various Artists	4
15	Kick	INXS	9
16	The Premiere Collection: The Best of Andrew Lloyd Webber	Various Artists	3 (Note: Reached number 1 on the UK Compilation Chart in 1989)
17	Whitney	Whitney Houston	6 (Note: Reached number 1 in 1987)
18	The Christians	The Christians	2
19	The Greatest Hits Collection	Bananarama	3
20	Heaven on Earth	Belinda Carlisle	4
21	The Innocents	Erasure	1
22	Hearsay	Alexander O'Neal	4
23	Turn Back the Clock	Johnny Hates Jazz	1
24	Introspective	Pet Shop Boys	2
25	Bridge of Spies	T'Pau	2 (Note: Reached number 1 in 1987)
26	The Best of OMD	Orchestral Manoeuvres in the Dark	2
27	Greatest Hits	Fleetwood Mac	3
28	Idol Songs: 11 of the Best	Billy Idol	2
29	New Light Through Old Windows	Chris Rea	12
30	The First of a Million Kisses	Fairground Attraction	2
31	The Greatest Love	Various Artists	11
32	The Ultimate Collection	Bryan Ferry and Roxy Music	6
33	Buster Original Soundtrack	Various Artists	6 (Note: Reached number 2 on the UK Compilation Chart in 1989)
34	Nite Flite	Various Artists	1
35	Actually	Pet Shop Boys	5 (Note: Reached number 2 in 1987)
36	Flying Colours	Chris de Burgh	1
37	Faith	George Michael	6 (Note: Reached number 1 in 1987)
38	Greatest Hits	The Human League	3
39	Whenever You Need Somebody	Rick Astley	2 (Note: Reached number 1 in 1987)
40	Soft Metal	Various Artists	7
41	Hits 9	Various Artists	5
42	To Whom It May Concern	The Pasadenas	3
43	Watermark	Enya	5
44	Hits 8	Various Artists	2
45	More Dirty Dancing	Various Artists	3
46	Give Me the Reason	Luther Vandross	3
47	Smash Hits Party '88	Various Artists	12
48	Wanted	Yazz	3
49	The Legendary Roy Orbison	Roy Orbison	1
50	Hot City Nights	Various Artists	1

== Classical music ==
- Malcolm Arnold – Robert Kett Overture (Op. 141)
- Geoffrey Burgon – The Trial of Prometheus
- Peter Maxwell Davies
  - Oboe Concerto
  - Trumpet Concerto No. 1 (from the Strathclyde Concertos)
- Stephen Dodgson – Promenade I for two guitars
- Michael Finnissy – Red Earth for orchestra
- Oliver Knussen – Flourish with Fireworks (original version)
- Michael Nyman – String Quartet No. 2
- Philip Sparke – A Swiss Festival Overture
- John Tavener – The Akathist of Thanksgiving

== Opera ==
- Mark-Anthony Turnage – Greek

== Film and Incidental music ==
- Michael Nyman – Drowning by Numbers directed by Peter Greenaway.

== Musical films ==
- It Couldn't Happen Here, starring the Pet Shop Boys
- Testimony: The Story of Shostakovich, starring Ben Kingsley, featuring the London Philharmonic Orchestra and the voices of John Shirley-Quirk and Felicity Palmer

== Musical theatre ==
- 22 October – Sherlock Holmes – The Musical by Leslie Bricusse opens at the Northcott Theatre, Exeter.

== Births ==
- 24 January – Jade Ewen, singer and actress
- 13 February – Aston Merrygold, singer-songwriter, dancer, and actor
- 27 March – Jessie J, singer
- 5 May – Adele, singer-songwriter
- 13 July – Tulisa Contostavlos, singer-songwriter and member of N-Dubz
- 19 July – Charlene Soraia, singer-songwriter
- 25 June – Amanda Marchant and Sam Marchant, singers (Samanda)
- 4 August – Tom Parker, singer (The Wanted) (died 2022)
- 6 September – Max George, singer (The Wanted)
- 26 September
  - James Blake, singer-songwriter and producer
  - Mark Simpson, clarinet player and composer
- 7 October – Lauren Mayberry, Scottish singer-songwriter (Chvrches)
- 2 December – Fuse ODG, Ghanaian-English recording artist
- 15 December – Lady Leshurr, rapper, singer-songwriter and producer
- 21 December
  - Yasmin, singer-songwriter and DJ
  - Alexa Goddard, singer
- 31 December – Holly Holyoake, singer

== Deaths ==
- 17 January – Harry Jacobs, conductor, 99
- 2 February – Solomon, pianist, 85
- 10 March
  - Andy Gibb, singer, 30 (myocarditis)
  - William Wordsworth, composer, 79
- 25 May – Martin Slavin, composer and music director, 66
- 3 July – George Lloyd, composer, 85
- 9 August – Peggy Cochrane, composer, 86
- 19 August – Sir Frederick Ashton, dancer and choreographer, 83
- 24 August – Kenneth Leighton, composer, 57 (cancer)
- 11 September – H. Hugh Bancroft, organist and composer, 84
- 23 September – Arwel Hughes, composer and conductor, 79
- 15 October – Kaikhosru Shapurji Sorabji, composer, music critic, pianist and writer, 96
- 11 November – William Ifor Jones, conductor and organist, 88
- 7 December – John Addison, composer, 78
- 21 December – Paul Jeffreys, bass player (Be-Bop Deluxe and Steve Harley & Cockney Rebel), 36 (air crash)
- 25 December – Denis Matthews, pianist and musicologist, 69

== Music awards ==
=== BRIT Awards ===
The 1988 BRIT Awards winners were:

- Best British producer: Stock Aitken Waterman
- Best classical recording: Ralph Vaughan Williams – Symphony No. 5
- Best international solo artist: Michael Jackson
- Best Music Video: New Order – "True Faith"
- Best soundtrack: "The Phantom of the Opera"
- British album: Sting – "...Nothing Like the Sun"
- British breakthrough act: Wet Wet Wet
- British female solo artist: Alison Moyet
- British group: Pet Shop Boys
- British male solo artist: George Michael
- British single: Rick Astley – "Never Gonna Give You Up"
- International breakthrough act: Terence Trent D'Arby
- International group: U2
- Outstanding contribution: The Who

== See also ==
- 1988 in British radio
- 1988 in British television
- 1988 in the United Kingdom
- List of British films of 1988
