= Sister (Bros song) =

Single by Bros

from the album The Time
- B-side: "I'll Count The Hours"
- Released: 16 December 1989
- Studio: Sarm West (London, England)
- Length: 3:33
- Label: CBS
- Songwriters: Matt Goss; Luke Goss; Nicky Graham
- Producer: Nicky Graham

Bros singles chronology
"Chocolate Box" (1988)	"Sister" (1989)	"Madly in Love" (1990)

"Sister" is a song by British pop band Bros, released as a single on 16 December 1989. "Sister" is the third single from their second album, The Time (1989). It reached number 10 on the UK Singles Chart.

== Track listing ==
UK 7-inch and cassette single

1. "Sister" – 3:33
2. "I'll Count the Hours" – 3:29

== Credits ==
- Written by Luke Goss, Matt Goss
- Published by EMI Music Publishing Ltd.
- Published by Graham Music Publishing Ltd.
- Published by Intersong Music Ltd.
- Distributed by CBS Records
- Pressed by CBS Pressing Plant, Aston Clinton

== Charts ==
Weekly chart performance for "Sister"
Chart (1989–1990)	Peak position
Belgium (Ultratop 50 Flanders)	36
Europe (Eurochart Hot 100)	34
Europe (European Hit Radio)	46
Ireland (IRMA)	5
Israel (IBA)	27
Italy (TV Sorrisi e Canzoni)	38
Spain Airplay (Top 40 Radio)	19
UK Singles (Official Charts)	10
UK Airplay (Music & Media)	12
