= Cat Among the Pigeons (song) =

1988 single by Bros

"Cat Among the Pigeons / Silent Night"
- Official 1988 Picture Sleeve

Single by Bros

from the album Push
- B-side: "Silent Night"
- Released: 21 November 1988
- Length: 3:33
- Label: CBS
- Songwriters: Tom Watkins; Nicky Graham
- Producer: Nicky Graham

Bros singles chronology
"I Quit" (1988)	"Cat Among the Pigeons / Silent Night" (1988)	"Too Much" (1989)

"Cat Among the Pigeons / Silent Night" is a single by British pop band Bros, released on 21 November 1988. The double-A side was the fifth single taken from their debut album, Push. It reached number two on the UK Singles Chart.

== Track listing ==
UK 7-inch, 12-inch, cassette single and compact disc

1. "Cat Among the Pigeons
2. "Silent Night

== Credits ==
- Matt Goss – vocals
- Luke Goss – drums
- Craig Logan – bass
- Nicky Graham and Tom Watkins – writers
- Nicky Graham – producer

== Charts ==
Chart (1988–1989)	Peak position
Australia (ARIA)	15
Europe (Eurochart Hot 100)	10
France (SNEP)	41
France Airplay (SNEP)	61
Ireland (IRMA)	4
Israel (IBA)	14
Netherlands (Single Top 100)	91
New Zealand (Recorded Music NZ)	27
Spain Airplay (Top 40 Radio)	32
UK Singles (Official Charts)	2
UK Airplay (Music & Media)	12
West Germany (GfK)	26
