= I Quit (Bros song) =

1988 single by Bros

- Official 1988 Picture Sleeve

Single by Bros

from the album Push
- B-side: "I Quit (Acid Drops)"
- Released: 5 September 1988
- Length: 3:33
- Label: CBS
- Songwriters: Tom Watkins; Nicky Graham
- Producer: Nicky Graham

Bros singles chronology
"I Owe You Nothing" (1989)	"I Quit" (1988)	"Cat Among the Pigeons" (1988)

"I Quit" is a song by British pop band Bros, released on 5 September 1988 by CBS Records as the fourth single from their debut album, Push (1988). It reached number four on the UK Singles Chart and number two in Ireland.

== Track listings ==
- UK 7-inch, 12-inch, cassette single and compact disc
1. "I Quit"
2. "I Quit" (Acidic Mix)

== Weekly charts ==
Chart (1988)	Peak position
Australia (ARIA)	14
Belgium (Ultratop 50 Flanders)	17
Europe (Eurochart Hot 100)	15
Europe (European Hit Radio)	25
Finland (Suomen virallinen lista)	15
France (SNEP)	25
France Airplay (SNEP)	53
Ireland (IRMA)	2
Israel (Israeli Singles Chart)	7
Netherlands (Dutch Top 40)	30
New Zealand (Recorded Music NZ)	47
Spain Airplay (Top 40 Radio)	20
UK Singles (Official Charts)	4
UK Airplay (Music & Media)	2
UK Network Chart (Network Chart)	3
West Germany (GfK)	38

== Credits ==
- Matt Goss – vocals
- Luke Goss – drums
- Craig Logan – bass
- Nicky Graham and Tom Watkins – writers
- Nicky Graham – producer
