= Chocolate Box (Bros song) =

1988 single by Bros

- Official 1989 Picture Sleeve

Single by Bros

from the album The Time
- B-side: "Life's A Heartbeat"
- Released: 7 October 1989
- Studio: (London, England)
- Length: 3:33
- Label: CBS
- Songwriters: Tom Watkins; Nicky Graham
- Producer: Nicky Graham

Bros singles chronology
"Too Much" (1989)	"Chocolate Box" (1989)	"Sister" (1989)

"Chocolate Box" is a song by British pop band Bros, released on 7 October 1989 by CBS Records as the second single from their second album, The Time (1989). It reached number nine on the UK Singles Chart.

== Track listings ==
- UK 7-inch, 12-inch, cassette single and compact disc
1. "Chocolate Box"
2. "Life a Hearbeat"

== Credits ==
- Design – Three Associates
- Engineer – Paul Wright
- Mixed By – Tom Lord Alge
- Photography by Neil Matthews
- Producer – Nicky Graham
- Written by, arranged by – Luke Goss, Matt Goss*, Nicky Graham

== Weekly charts ==
Chart (1989)	Peak position
Australia (ARIA)	23
Belgium (Ultratop 50 Flanders)	35
Europe (Eurochart Hot 100)	33
Europe (European Hit Radio)	33
Finland (Suomen virallinen lista)	8
Ireland (IRMA)	2
Israel (Israeli Singles Chart)	6
Italy (Musica e dischi)	25
Italy (TV Sorrisi e Canzoni)	20
Netherlands (Dutch Top 40)	87
New Zealand (Recorded Music NZ)	29
Spain Airplay (Top 40 Radio)	4
UK Singles (Official Charts)	9
UK Airplay (Music & Media)	12
UK Network Chart (Network Chart)	9
