= Are You Mine? (Bros song) =

1988 single by Bros

- Official 1991 Picture Sleeve

Single by Bros

from the album Changing Faces
- B-side: "Are You Mine? (Instrumental Mix)"
- Released: 13 July 1991
- Studio: (London, England)
- Length: 3:33
- Label: CBS
- Songwriters: Matt Goss; Luke Goss
- Producer: Gary Stevenson

Bros singles chronology
"Madly In Love" (1989)	"Are You Mine?" (1991)	"Try" (1991)

"Are You Mine?" is a song by British pop band Bros, released on 13 July 1991 by CBS Records as the first single from their third album, Changing Faces (1991). It reached number 12 on the UK Singles Chart and Number six in Ireland.

== Track listings ==
- UK 7-inch, 12-inch, cassette single and compact disc
1. "Are You Mine?"
2. "Are You Mine?" (Instrumental)

== Charts ==
Chart (1991)	Peak position
Belgium (Ultratop 50 Flanders)	27
Europe (Eurochart Hot 100)	30
Finland (Suomen virallinen lista)	20
France (SNEP)	82
France Airplay (SNEP)	82
Ireland (IRMA)	6
Israel (Israeli Singles Chart)	41
Luxembourg (Radio Luxembourg)	7
Spain Airplay (Top 40 Radio)	3
Sweden (Sverigetopplistan)	30
UK Singles (Official Charts)	12
UK Airplay (Music Week)	11

== Credits ==
- Written by Luke Goss, Matt Goss, Paul Powell
- Drums – Luke Goss
- Vocals – Matt Goss
- Backing vocals – Katie Kissoon, Matt Goss, Shirley Lewis
- Engineer – John Gallen
- Guitar – Paul Gendler
- Keyboards – Dave West
- Additional keyboards – Matt Goss
- Mixed by John Gallen
- Producer – Gary Stevenson
- Programmed by Dave West
- Photograph by Peter Mountain
