= 2wo (disambiguation) =

2wo, or Two, is an English industrial metal band.

2wo may also refer to:

- 2WO, a 1985 album by Strange Advance
- 2wo:Thirteen or Two:Thirteen, a 2009 American thriller film

== See also ==
- 2wo Third3, a 1990s British electropop group
