= The End (UK band) =

British psychedelic pop band

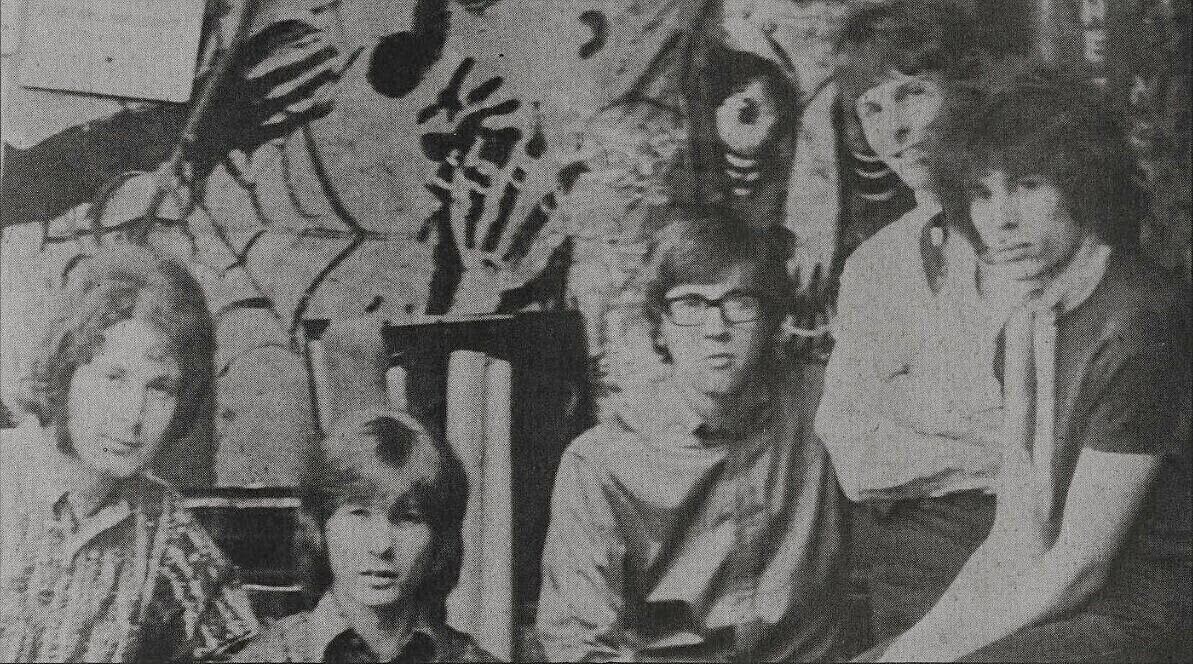

Background information
- Genre: Psychedelic pop
- Years active: 1965–1970
- Past members: Dave Brown; Colin Giffin; Nick Graham; John Horton; Hugh Atwooll

The End was a British psychedelic pop band formed in 1965 by Dave Brown (bass, vocals) and Colin Giffin (guitar, lead vocals) following the demise of The Innocents. Nick Graham (keyboards, vocals) and John Horton (saxophone) joined from Dickie Pride's backing group, The Original Topics, and Roger Groom (drums) of The Tuxedos completed the line-up. The band was produced by Rolling Stone Bill Wyman, who arranged for them to tour with his group. After the tour, Grooms quit and was replaced by Hugh Atwooll, an old friend of Graham. Horton would also quit, but continued to work with the band on their second single, "Shades of Orange". In 1969, the band released their only album, Introspection. After the group split up, three of its members founded Tucky Buzzard, who recorded three unsuccessful albums in the 1970s.

A compilation album entitled From Beginning To End is available on Spotify. It contains 61 songs and has a publication date of 1996.

John Horton died on 25 September 2023, at the age of 77.

They are not to be confused with the similarly named California band, who released two singles for Kabron Records in 1966–67.

== Discography ==
- Introspection (Decca, 1969)
- End (EMidisc, 1970)
- The Last Word (Tenth Planet, 2000)
