= 2wo Third3 =

Four-piece 1990s electropop group

2wo Third3 (pronounced "two thirds") were a four-piece 1990s electropop group, with three performing members and one non-performing songwriting member. They were called 2wo Third3 because out of the performing members, the two backing members dressed in identical clothing usually with rubber gloves and the frontman, Lee, did not. He usually wore a trademark 2wo Third3 plaster on his face (this being pre-Nelly). The fourth member was represented by a cartoon character called "Biff", who appeared in the band's promotional material and record covers.

The group were managed by East 17/Bros manager Tom Watkins and signed to Sony Music UK's Epic label. The design aspect of the group was very important, with customised yellow rubber gloves being sent out with promotional records, and a free Biff plaster being issued to fans.

The band supported East 17 on their "Around the World" tour in 1994.

In 2007, Lee (a.k.a. 4th Child), was signed by Hit! Records, and recorded a new version of "Now I Found You" in March of that year.

== Biff ==
Richard "Biff" Stannard went on to become a songwriter for many other groups such as 5ive and Spice Girls. He formed the songwriting and production team Biffco, along with Julian Gallagher and Ash Howes.

== Singles ==
- "Hear Me Calling" (Epic Records/Sony Music - 1994) - UK No. 48
- "Ease the Pressure" (Epic Records/Sony Music - 1994) - UK No. 46
- "I Want the World" (Epic Records/Sony Music - 1994) - UK No. 20
- "I Want to Be Alone" (Epic Records/Sony Music - 1995) - UK No. 29
