= Too Much (Bros song) =

1989 single by Bros

- Artwork for one of the UK vinyl releases, also used for European and Australian releases

Single by Bros

from the album The Time
- B-side: "Astrologically"
- Released: 17 July 1989
- Studio: Sarm West (London, England)
- Length: 3:33
- Label: CBS
- Songwriters: Matt Goss; Luke Goss; Nicky Graham
- Producer: Nicky Graham

Bros singles chronology
"Cat Among the Pigeons" / "Silent Night" (1988)	"Too Much" (1989)	"Chocolate Box" (1989)

Music video
- "Too Much" on YouTube

"Too Much" is a song by the British pop band Bros, released on 17 July 1989, by CBS. It was the band's first and most commercially successful single from their second album, The Time (1989). The song achieved significant chart success, reaching number one in Ireland and number two on the UK Singles Chart, where it was subsequently certified silver. The single performed well across Europe and in Australia but marked the band's last appearance in the UK top five.

== Critical reception ==
Upon release David Giles of British magazine Music Week reviewed the single positively and wrote: "This single is a lot raunchier than their previous releases, with intrusions of loud guitar and clattering rhythm helping to enhance the distinctly bluesy vocal."

== Music video ==
The video for the single was directed by Colin Chilvers, who also directed Michael Jackson's "Smooth Criminal" video, and produced by Nick Verden in the south of France, in and around Nice.

== Track listings ==
- UK 7-inch and cassette single
1. "Too Much" – 3:33
2. "Astrologically" – 3:29
- UK 12-inch and CD single
1. "Too Much" (extended version) – 6:42
2. "Too Much" – 3:33
3. "Astrologically" – 3:29

== Credits ==
- Nicky Graham – producer
- Paul Wright – engineer
- Tom Lord-Alge – mix of "Too Much"

== Charts ==
=== Weekly charts ===
Chart (1989)	Peak position
Australia (ARIA)	11
Belgium (Ultratop 50 Flanders)	21
Denmark (IFPI)	3
Europe (Eurochart Hot 100)	7
Europe (European Hit Radio)	10
Finland (Suomen virallinen lista)	4
France (SNEP)	37
France Airplay (SNEP)	37
Ireland (IRMA)	1
Israel (Israeli Singles Chart)	9
Italy (TV Sorrisi e Canzoni)	47
Netherlands (Single Top 100)	42
New Zealand (Recorded Music NZ)	6
Spain Airplay (Top 40 Radio)	17
Switzerland (Schweizer Hitparade)	24
UK Singles (Official Charts)	2
UK Airplay (Music & Media)	1
West Germany (GfK)	28

=== Year-end charts ===
Chart (1989)	Position
Israel (Israeli Singles Chart)	62
UK Singles (OCC)	75

== Certifications ==
Region	Certification	Certified units/sales
United Kingdom (BPI)	Silver	200,000^{^}
^{^} Shipments figures based on certification alone.
