= Holly Holyoake =

Welsh singer

- Born: 31 December 1988 (age 36); Newport, Wales
- Occupation: Singer

Holly Holyoake (born 31 December 1988) is a Welsh classical music singer from Duffryn, Newport. A soprano, she has been likened to fellow Welsh performer Katherine Jenkins. Her career is following a similar path to Jenkins and she has performed before the Wales national rugby union team matches at the Millennium Stadium. She considers American tenor Mario Lanza her inspiration.

Holyoake's debut album, When Dreams Have Wings, was self-released in 2002 with the catalogue number HRH1, and recorded when she was just 14.

In 2004, Holyoake performed with Hayley Westenra in Cardiff. She came to prominence in August 2005 when, aged 17, she won a gold award in the Open category of the World Championships of Performing Arts in Hollywood. She was the only person representing the UK - competing against accomplished musicians from 40 countries across the world.

Wales Online selected Holyoake as the sexiest woman in Wales in 2005.
