= Changing Faces (Bros album) =

Studio album by Bros
- Released: 30 September 1991
- Genres: Pop, dance-pop
- Length: 43:45
- Label: CBS
- Producer: Gary Stevenson

Bros chronology
The Time (1989)	Changing Faces (1991)	The Best Remixes (1991)

Singles from Changing Faces
- 1. "Are You Mine?" Released: 1 July 1991; 2. "Try" Released: 9 September 1991

Changing Faces is the third and final studio album by British pop band Bros. It was released on 30 September 1991 and was the first album on which Matt Goss and Luke Goss co-wrote all the songs. It was also the first time that Nicky Graham was not involved in either writing or production duties. The album reached number 18 on the UK Albums Chart and spawned two singles, both of which made the top 40 on the UK Singles Chart.

== Critical reception ==
Professional ratings
Review scores
Source	Rating
AllMusic	2/5 stars
Calgary Herald	C
Encyclopedia of Popular Music	2/5 stars
Q	2/5 stars

Reviews of the album were largely negative. Jimmy Nichol of Q said that the album tried hard to copy the style of George Michael in an attempt to find success, although "there are some nice ballads". He concluded, however, that Changing Faces "suffers partly from Matt's incessantly misogynistic lyrics ... but mostly from Bros' inability to produce genuinely original material of their own". In Melody Maker the Stud Brothers stated that "Bros have given up their arrogance and thus nothing of what made them a (marginally) diverting phenomenon remains". They said that the album's combination of "fake funk and heinously over-sentimental ballads is so grotesquely lush and sickeningly opulent – swooning saccharin orchestras and chunky session guitar – you wonder at whom it could possibly be aimed".

== Track listing ==
All songs written by Matt and Luke Goss unless indicated.

1. "Try" – 4:20
2. "Never Love Again" – 4:39
3. "Just Another Tear" – 3:57
4. "Leave Me Alone" (M. Goss, L. Goss, I. Green) – 3:33
5. "Are You Mine?" (M. Goss, L. Goss, P. Powell) – 5:36
6. "Changing Faces" – 3:59
7. "You're My Life" (M. Goss, L. Goss, G. Cole) – 4:13
8. "Don't Go Loving Me Now" – 3:44
9. "Shot in the Back" – 4:16
10. "Break My Silence" – 4:55

== Charts ==
Chart (1991)	Peak position
Australian Albums (ARIA)	176
European Albums	85
UK Albums (Official Charts)	18
