= Push (Bros album) =

Studio album by Bros
- Released: 28 March 1988
- Recorded: 1987
- Studios: Hot Nights Studio, Fulham, London
- Genres: Teen pop, dance-pop
- Length: 42:13
- Label: CBS
- Producer: Nicky Graham

Bros chronology
Push (1988)	The Time (1989)

Singles from Push
- 1. "I Owe You Nothing" Released: 31 August 1987; 2. "When Will I Be Famous?" Released: 16 November 1987; 3. "Drop the Boy" Released: 7 March 1988; 4. "I Owe You Nothing (reissue)" Released: 6 June 1988; 5. "I Quit" Released: 5 September 1988; 6. "Cat Among the Pigeons"/"Silent Night" Released: 21 November 1988

Push is the debut album by British pop band Bros and was released on CBS on 28 March 1988. The album peaked at number two in the UK Albums Chart and was certified quadruple platinum in the UK. It also achieved worldwide success, reaching number one in New Zealand and the top ten in Australia and several countries in Europe.

In late 2013, a 25th anniversary 3-CD remastered and expanded edition of Push was released on the Cherry Pop record label, a subsidiary of Cherry Red Records. The cover of the Christmas carol "Silent Night", originally released as a double A-side single with "Cat Among the Pigeons", was included on the expanded edition, as well as B-sides and remixes from the five singles that were released from the album.

== Writing and composition ==
All the songs were written by Nicky Graham and Bros' manager Tom Watkins, with Graham composing the music and Watkins writing the lyrics. The pair used the pseudonym "The Brothers" in order to imply that the songs had been written by the Goss twins, and that the group was not simply a manufactured pop outfit. In his autobiography Watkins described how he had deliberately come up with song titles and lyrics that the teen market could identify with, such as "Drop the Boy" being about a youth asking to be treated as an adult. Other themes included childhood poverty ("Ten Out of Ten"), the then-current AIDS epidemic ("Shocked"), and past relationships ("I Owe You Nothing"). One of the album's more serious lyrical subjects was the closing ballad "Cat Among the Pigeons", which Watkins stated was about a friend who had struggled to cope with the early death of their father, and as a result had embarked on tempestuous and doomed relationships. Watkins also admitted that his original, more explicit lyric for "When Will I Be Famous?", a song that had been created for his own short-lived band the Hudsons, had been written as a conversation between two gay men: a young man desperate for fame and attention, and an older, more experienced man giving his advice. When he and Graham decided to give the song to Bros to record, Watkins toned down the lyrics and removed the references to homosexuality.

Graham composed the music using some basic equipment at his home in Wimbledon in south-west London, before taking the songs to his Hot Nights studio a short distance away in Fulham. There he played all the instruments and programmed all the keyboards, before inviting the group to the studio to learn their parts and record Matt Goss' vocals.

Talking to Smash Hits in April 1988, Matt Goss explained why the album was titled Push: "Well, when we were in the studio recording it, if one of us was really, like, going for it we'd say, 'Right man, that's really pushing it.' It's a word we all latched on to, and Nicky latched on to it too. We'd all be going, 'Is that pushing it? Yeah, that's push.' So the album couldn't really be called anything else."

== Promotion ==
On Friday 25 March, three days before the album's release, ITV screened a 30-minute special programme, featuring the group performing four songs from the upcoming album, and interviews with each group member.

== Critical reception ==
Professional ratings
Review scores
Source	Rating
AllMusic	4/5 stars
The Encyclopedia of Popular Music	3/5 stars
Number One	5/5 stars
Q	3/5 stars
Record Mirror	4/5 stars

Reviews of Push in the UK music press were mixed. In Melody Maker Jonh Wilde described the album as "ten songs that are entirely modern in an entirely charmless way", and called it "sad and useless" and "mediocrity's snowy mountain-top". However, Tim Nicholson of Record Mirror stated that "Push is perfectly crafted pop oozing pre-sex appeal". In Q, Chris Heath praised Matt Goss's ability to sing as well as his hero Michael Jackson, and said, "Push suggests that it'd be unwise to write Bros off too quickly." He went on to state that despite the group's teen image and some of the lyrics, "there are several excellent moments".

In a retrospective review for AllMusic, Brendan Swift highlighted "When Will I Be Famous?" and "I Owe You Nothing" as good examples of 1980s pop music, and that while the album contained few low points it also lacked depth, commenting that "Push makes for far better dancing than listening".

== Chart performance ==
In the UK Albums Chart, Push was kept off the number one spot by the compilation album Now 11 for two weeks, and then by Tracy Chapman's self-titled album for a week, although Push went on to sell more copies than both albums in 1988 and ranked as the fourth best-selling album for that year in the UK.

== Track listing ==
All tracks written by The Brothers (a pseudonym for Nicky Graham and Tom Watkins), except where noted.

Side one ("Push Side")
No.	Title	Length
1.	"When Will I Be Famous?"	5:02
2.	"Drop the Boy"	4:08
3.	"Ten Out of Ten"	4:06
4.	"Liar"	3:42
5.	"Love to Hate You"	5:17

Side two ("Pull Side")
No.	Title	Length
1.	"I Owe You Nothing"	3:40
2.	"I Quit"	3:32
3.	"It's a Jungle Out There"	4:14
4.	"Shocked"	4:19
5.	"Cat Among the Pigeons"	4:05

2013 deluxe edition (Disc 1 continued)
No.	Title	Length
11.	"I Owe You Nothing" (7" mix)	3:35
12.	"I Quit" (single mix)	3:32
13.	"Drop the Boy" (single edit)	3:49
14.	"When Will I Be Famous?" (single edit)	4:00

2013 deluxe edition bonus tracks (Disc 2)
No.	Title	Writer(s)	Length
1.	"The Boy Is Dropped"		3:54
2.	"Silent Night"	Traditional	3:53
3.	"Shocked" (live)		6:07
4.	"The Big Push Overture"		5:50
5.	"I Owe You Nothing" (The Pettibone Remix)		6:38
6.	"I Owe You Nothing" (Pettibeats)		3:41
7.	"I Owe You Nothing" (The Voice)		3:18
8.	"I Owe You Nothing" (Club Mix)		7:42
9.	"I Owe You Nothing" (The Beats)		3:42
10.	"I Owe You Nothing" (Over 18 Mix)		18:01

2013 deluxe edition bonus tracks (Disc 3)
No.	Title	Length
1.	"When Will I Be Famous?" (Contender Dub Mix)	8:21
2.	"When Will I Be Famous?" (Infamous Mix)	5:44
3.	"When Will I Be Famous?" (Club Mix)	8:11
4.	"When Will I Be Famous?" (Acapella Mix)	4:05
5.	"When Will I Be Famous?" (Bonus Beats)	2:56
6.	"Drop the Boy" (Art Mix)	5:56
7.	"Drop the Boy" (Shep Pettibone Dub Mix)	7:04
8.	"Drop the Boy" (Shep Pettibone Mix)	6:47
9.	"I Quit" (Acid Drops)	4:01
10.	"I Quit" (The "Turn-On" Mix)	6:55
11.	"I Quit" (The Acidic Mix)	8:07

== Personnel ==
Bros

- Matt Goss – vocals
- Luke Goss – drums
- Craig Logan – bass

Additional personnel

- Nicky Graham – keyboards, programming and arranging
- Pete Glenister – guitars
- Andy Richards – Fairlight Series III
- Jimmie Gallagher – saxophones
- Helena Springs – backing vocals
- Dee Lewis – backing vocals
- Shirley Lewis – backing vocals

Production

- Produced and mixed by Nicky Graham
- Engineered by Christopher Marc Potter
- Assisted by Alex Osman, Richard Edwards
- Designed by Three Associates
- Photography by Neil Matthews

== Charts ==
=== Weekly charts ===
Weekly chart performance for Push
Chart (1988)	Peak position
Australian Albums (ARIA)	4
Austrian Albums (Ö3 Austria)	14
Dutch Albums (Album Top 100)	32
European Albums Chart	6
Finnish Albums (Suomen virallinen lista)	7
German Albums (Offizielle Top 100)	6
Iceland Albums (Tonlist)	2
Italian Albums (Musica e dischi)	7
Japanese Albums (Oricon)	49
New Zealand Albums (RMNZ)	1
Norwegian Albums (VG-lista)	6
Spanish Albums (PROMUSICAE)	31
Swedish Albums (Sverigetopplistan)	29
Swiss Albums (Schweizer Hitparade)	3
UK Albums (Official Charts)	2
US Billboard 200	171
Zimbabwean Albums (ZIMA)	10

=== Year-end charts ===
Year-end chart performance for Push
Chart (1988)	Rank
Australian Albums	9
Austrian Albums	22
European Albums (Eurochart Hot 100)	15
German Albums	28
UK Albums (Gallup)	4
Chart (1989)	Rank
European Albums (Eurochart Hot 100)	43

== Certifications ==
Certifications for Push
Region	Certification	Certified units/sales
Australia (ARIA)	2× Platinum	140,000^{^}
France (SNEP)	2× Gold	200,000^{*}
Germany (BVMI)	Gold	250,000^{^}
New Zealand (RMNZ)	Platinum	15,000^{^}
Portugal (AFP)	Gold	20,000^{^}
Spain (Promusicae)	Gold	50,000^{^}
Switzerland (IFPI Switzerland)	Gold	25,000^{^}
United Kingdom (BPI)	4× Platinum	1,200,000^{^}
^{*} Sales figures based on certification alone.^{^} Shipments figures based on certification alone.

== Release history ==
Release history and formats for Push
Region	Date	Label	Format	Catalog
United Kingdom & Europe Australia	28 March 1988	CBS	LP	460629 1
United Kingdom & Europe Australia	28 March 1988	CBS	LP picture disc	460629 0
United Kingdom & Europe Australia	28 March 1988	CBS	cassette	460629 4
United Kingdom & Europe Australia	28 March 1988	CBS	CD	460629 2
United Kingdom & Europe Australia	28 March 1988	CBS	limited edition picture CD	460629 9
Japan	22 June 1988	Epic	cassette	25 6P-5022
Japan	22 June 1988	Epic	CD	25 8P-5022
United States	July 1988	Epic	LP	E 44285
United States	July 1988	Epic	cassette	ET 44285
United States	July 1988	Epic	CD	EK 44285
Canada	July 1988	Epic	LP	BFE 44285
Canada	July 1988	Epic	cassette	BFET 44285
Canada	July 1988	Epic	CD	BFEK 44285
United Kingdom & Europe	24 July 2004	Columbia	remastered CD	460629 2/4606292004
United Kingdom	4 November 2013	Cherry Pop	3-CD deluxe version	CRPOPT137
United Kingdom	23 June 2023	Music on Vinyl	LP (blue) limited Edn (1000 copies)	MOVLP3341
