= Drop the Boy =

1988 single by Bros

Single by Bros

from the album Push
- B-side: "The Boy Is Dropped"
- Released: 7 March 1988
- Length: 3:50
- Label: CBS
- Songwriters: Nicky Graham; Tom Watkins
- Producer: Nicky Graham

Bros singles chronology
"When Will I Be Famous?" (1987)	"Drop the Boy" (1988)	"I Owe You Nothing" (1988)

Music video
- "Drop the Boy" on YouTube

Professional ratings
Review scores
Source	Rating
Number One	3/5 stars

"Drop the Boy" is a song by British boy band Bros. It was written by Nicky Graham and Tom Watkins, and released in March 1988, by CBS, as the follow-up single to "When Will I Be Famous?". The single reached number one in Ireland and number two in the United Kingdom, where it was certified silver. Additionally, it peaked within the top 10 in Australia, Denmark, New Zealand, Norway, Switzerland and West Germany.

== Critical reception ==
Debbi Voller from Number One concluded in her review of the song, "It'll be a biggie, and deservedly so".

== Track listings ==
- 7-inch single

A. "Drop the Boy
B. "The Boy Is Dropped"

- 12-inch single

A1. "Drop the Boy" (the Shep Pettibone mix)
B1. "Drop the Boy" (the Shep Pettibone dub mix)
B2. "The Boy Is Dropped"

- 12-inch "Art Mix" single

A1. "Drop the Boy" (Art mix)
B1. "Drop the Boy" (the Shep Pettibone dub mix)
B2. "The Boy Is Dropped"

- CD single
1. "Drop the Boy"
2. "Drop the Boy" (the Shep Pettibone mix)
3. "When Will I Be Famous?" (remix)
4. "The Boy Is Dropped"

== Charts ==
=== Weekly charts ===
Chart (1988)	Peak position
Australia (ARIA)	9
Austria (Ö3 Austria Top 40)	17
Belgium (Ultratop 50 Flanders)	34
Denmark (IFPI)	7
Europe (European Hot 100 Singles)	5
Europe (European Hit Radio)	12
Finland (Suomen virallinen lista)	6
Ireland (IRMA)	1
Israel (Israeli Singles Chart)	6
Italy (Musica e dischi)	14
Italy Airplay (Music & Media)	10
Netherlands (Dutch Top 40)	31
Netherlands (Single Top 100)	23
New Zealand (Recorded Music NZ)	8
Norway (VG-lista)	2
Spain Airplay (Top 40 Radio)	24
Switzerland (Schweizer Hitparade)	5
UK Singles (Official Charts)	2
UK Airplay (Music & Media)	4
West Germany (GfK)	9

=== Year-end charts ===
Chart (1988)	Rank
Europe (Eurochart Hot 100)	64
Israel (Israeli Singles Chart)	74
New Zealand (RIANZ)	24
UK Singles (Gallup)	31

== Certifications ==
Region	Certification	Certified units/sales
United Kingdom (BPI)	Silver	250,000^{^}
^{^} Shipments figures based on certification alone.
