= The Jack That House Built =

Single by Jack 'N' Chill
- B-side: "The Jack That House Dubbed"
- Released: 1987
- Genre: House
- Label: 10 Records
- Songwriter: Vlad Naslas
- Producer: Sonic Graffiti

Jack 'N' Chill singles chronology
"The Jack That House Built" (1987)	"Beatin' The Heat" (1988)

"The Jack That House Built" is a song by British house music act under the name of Jack 'N' Chill consisting of band members Edward "Ed" Stratton and Vlad Naslas. It was first released in June 1987 but failed to reach Top 40. It was re-released in early 1988, and in February, it reached a peak of no. 6 in the UK, charting in the top 100 for a total of 18 weeks.

The song is an electronic house instrumental that sampled the "Yeah Yeah" vocals from a track by Evelyn King. The song was created on an Atari ST. The title is a word play on the nursery rhyme "This Is the House That Jack Built"; the "jack" in the song title refers to the jacking dance moves while "house" refers to house music. When Jack 'N' Chill appeared on Top of the Pops, their performance featured a bodybuilder jacking to their house music. The song was used in the soundtrack of the film Sammy and Rosie Get Laid.

== Charts ==
Chart (1988)	Peak position
Ireland (IRMA)	19
UK Singles (OCC)	6
