= B.V.S.M.P. =

American hip hop group

- Origin: Fort Lauderdale, Florida, U.S.
- Genres: Hip hop; electro; new jack swing
- Years active: 1987–1994
- Label: BCM Records
- Members: Calvin Williams; Frederick Byrd; Percy Rodgers

B.V.S.M.P. was an American hip hop group, formed in the 1980s. The band consisted of Percy Rodgers (born 3 October 1966), Calvin Williams (born 28 November 1965) and Frederick Byrd (born 11 December 1966).

B.V.S.M.P. (short for Baby Virgo Shocking Mister P) is best remembered for the hit single "I Need You", which became a worldwide hit in the summer of 1988. It spent 12 weeks on the UK Singles Chart, peaking at number 3 in August 1988. The background music and vocal was also sampled on the hit dance song, "The Electric Slide".

B.V.S.M.P. are also mentioned by name in the track, "Roller Disco" on Goldie Lookin Chain's Greatest Hits album.

== Discography ==
=== Studio albums ===
- The Best Belong Together (1988)
- Shake That Thang (1993)

=== Singles ===
Year	Single	Peak positions									Album
Year	Single	UK	IRE	FRA	NED	BEL (FLA)	GER	AUT	SWI	SWE	Album
1988	"I Need You"	3	7	32	7	13	3	25	25	14	The Best Belong Together
1988	"Be Gentle"	—	—	—	15	28	12	—	—	—	The Best Belong Together
1988	"Anytime"	86	—	—	—	—	21	—	22	—	The Best Belong Together
1989	"On and On (Can We Go On)"	—	—	—	—	—	—	—	—	—	The Best Belong Together
1991	"Hold Me"	—	—	—	—	—	—	—	—	—	Shake That Thang
1993	"Dodo Monster"	—	—	—	—	—	—	—	—	—	Shake That Thang
1993	"I Need You '93"	—	—	—	—	—	—	—	—	—	Shake That Thang
1993	"I'm in Love"	—	—	—	—	—	—	—	—	—	Shake That Thang
1998	"98'Er Megamix"	—	—	—	—	—	—	—	—	—	The Best of B.V.S.M.P.
"—" denotes releases that did not chart or were not released.
