= House Arrest (song) =

Single by Krush
- Released: 1987
- Genre: House
- Length: 6:34; 3:36
- Label: Club, Fon, Phonogram, Mercury
- Songwriters: Cassius Campbell, Mark Gamble, Ruth Joy
- Producers: Mark Brydon, Robert Gordon

Krush singles chronology
"House Arrest" (1987)	"Walking on Sunshine" (1992)

"House Arrest" is a song by British dance group Krush. Released as a single in 1987, it is hailed as one of the forerunners of the British house music scene and became the group's biggest hit, reaching the top 20 charts in at least 8 countries in Europe. The song peaked at No. 3 on the UK Singles Chart, No. 12 in Austria and Belgium, No. 15 in Sweden, No. 7 in the Netherlands, No. 5 in Germany, No. 2 in Norway, and No. 1 in Switzerland for two weeks in early 1988. It also peaked at No. 31 in New Zealand.

== Charts ==
=== Weekly charts ===
Chart (1987–1988)	Peak position
Austria (Ö3 Austria Top 40)	12
Belgium (Ultratop 50 Flanders)	12
Europe (European Hot 100 Singles)	8
Ireland (IRMA)	21
Netherlands (Dutch Top 40)	7
Netherlands (Single Top 100)	7
New Zealand (Recorded Music NZ)	31
Norway (VG-lista)	2
Sweden (Sverigetopplistan)	15
Switzerland (Schweizer Hitparade)	1
UK Singles (OCC)	3
West Germany (GfK)	5

=== Year-end charts ===
Chart (1988)	Position
Europe (European Hot 100 Singles)	46
Netherlands (Dutch Top 40)	84
Netherlands (Single Top 100)	77
Switzerland (Schweizer Hitparade)	18
West Germany (Media Control)	29
