= Tom Watkins (music manager) =

British music executive (1949–2020)

- Born: 21 September 1949; Greenwich, London, England
- Died: 24 February 2020 (aged 70)
- Occupations: Music manager; music producer; designer; composer

Tom Watkins (21 September 1949 – 24 February 2020) was an English pop impresario, music manager, songwriter, producer, designer, and fine art collector. With a background in art and design, Watkins set up the XL Design agency in the early 1980s and was responsible for designing record sleeves and music graphics of the period. Watkins moved into music management by the mid-1980s and managed Pet Shop Boys, Bros, and East 17, among others. Watkins has been described by Neil Tennant as "a big man with a loud voice" and by David Munns as "an unstoppable creative powerhouse."

== Early life ==
Watkins was born Thomas Frederick Watkins on 21 September 1949 at St. Alfege's Hospital, Greenwich, London, the son of Patricia Daphne Diett and Frederick Joseph Watkins. He lived in Blackheath, London, and was educated at Invicta Road School, Sherrington Road School, and Raine's Foundation School in Tower Hamlets, London. Watkins later attended Sir John Cass School of Art, Architecture and Design and went on to study art and design at London College of Furniture, London Metropolitan University.

== Early career ==
In the early 1970s after graduating from the London College of Furniture, Watkins worked as a designer for Terence Conran and Rodney Fitch as part of the team that designed Heathrow Terminal 3 and the London Stock Exchange.

In 1981 Watkins and business partner Royston Edwards set up the graphics design company XL Design with an office in Welbeck Street, London, initially designing music graphics and marketing campaigns, then later record sleeves. In 1982 XL designed the record sleeve for Wham!'s debut single "Wham Rap! (Enjoy What You Do)"

When the British record label ZTT became clients in 1983, XL designed record sleeves for Art of Noise and for "Relax", the 1983 debut single of Frankie Goes to Hollywood. XL designed many of the Frankie Goes to Hollywood ads, promo posters, and graphics, including the record sleeves for their next three singles, "Two Tribes", "The Power of Love" (both 1984), and "Welcome to the Pleasuredome" (1985). In 1984 XL designed the sleeve for their debut album Welcome to the Pleasuredome.

In 1983 Trevor Horn and Jill Sinclair of ZTT Records commissioned Watkins to design the interior of their new recording studios, Sarm West Studios, in Notting Hill.

The XL Design agency was responsible for creating iconic logos, music advertising graphics, and record sleeve art of the 1980s for the aforementioned bands along with OMD, Kim Wilde, Nik Kershaw, Duran Duran, and the Pet Shop Boys.

== Music management ==
In 1984 Watkins moved his XL Design agency to larger offices in Poland Street, Soho, and set up a new company, Massive Management, developing a parallel career in music management. Mark Farrow joined Watkins' XL Design agency in 1985. Watkins felt the minimal aesthetics of his designs would be perfect for the Pet Shop Boys. In 1986 Watkins, Farrow, and business partner Mick Newton set up a new design agency, Three Associates. The Three Associates agency were responsible for creating record sleeve art throughout the late 1980s and early 1990s for artists like Pet Shop Boys, Bros, Liza Minnelli, and Kim Wilde. Watkins went on to manage Pet Shop Boys (1984 to 1989), Bros (1986 to 1990), East 17 (1992 to 1997), Electribe 101 (1989 to 1990), Faith Hope & Charity (1990), 2wo Third3 (1994 to 1995), and Deuce (1994 to 1996).

Watkins was also a songwriter and music producer. In collaboration with Nicky Graham, Watkins wrote all the tracks on the debut Bros album Push, including the hit singles, "When Will I Be Famous", "Drop the Boy", and "I Owe You Nothing", which reached number one on the UK Singles Chart in June 1988.

In 1999 Channel 4 produced Mr Rock & Roll, a four-part documentary series "looking at the lives and the careers of the most powerful, most outrageous, and most astute managers in the history of Rock and Roll". The series featured the stories of Tom Watkins, Colonel Tom Parker, Don Arden, and Peter Grant.

=== Pet Shop Boys ===
In late 1984 the Pet Shop Boys hired Watkins as their manager with Massive Management. In March 1985 Watkins signed them to EMI record label subsidiary Parlophone. Under Watkins' management the Pet Shop Boys released twelve singles, achieving four number ones on the UK Singles Chart (with "West End Girls" (1985), "It's a Sin" (1987), "Always on My Mind" (1987), and "Heart" (1988)) and three studio albums. The debut album Please was released in April 1986; it peaked at number 3 on the UK Albums Chart and was certified platinum by the British Phonographic Industry (BPI). The second album Actually was released in September 1987, reaching a high of number 2 in the UK and certified triple platinum by the BPI. In October 1988 their third album Introspective also hit number 2 in the UK and was certified double platinum. Additionally in November 1986, a remix album Disco peaked at number 15 in the UK and was certified platinum.

=== Bros ===
In 1986 brothers Matt and Luke Goss and Craig Logan signed with Watkins' Massive Management as the group Bros. Watkins then signed the band to the CBS label. Their first single, "I Owe You Nothing", was released in September 1987 and only reached number 80 in the UK. Their next two singles, "When Will I Be Famous" (November 1987) and "Drop the Boy" (March 1988), both peaked at number 2. Then a re-release of "I Owe You Nothing" in June 1988 ultimately reached number one. Bros' debut album Push was released in March 1988 and climbed to number 2 on the UK Albums Chart and was certified quadruple platinum status by the BPI. Their second album, The Time, was released in October 1989 and peaked at number 4.

Bros toured the UK on their ‘Big Push Tour’ in June/July 1988 and then Europe and Australia on their ‘Global Push Tour’ late 1988 to early 1989. In February 1989 Bros won the Best British Newcomer Award at the Brit Awards, and in August 1989 they played Wembley Stadium at their ‘Bros in 2 Summer’ concert.

=== East 17 ===
East 17 signed with Massive Management in April 1992. Watkins signed the band to London Records. Under Watkins' management between 1992 and 1997, East 17 released 16 singles—11 of which entered the top 10 of the UK Singles Chart. "Stay Another Day" was released in December 1994 and became the group's only number one, remaining at the top for five weeks. They released their debut album Walthamstow in February 1993. The album reached number one and was certified platinum by the BPI. Their second album Steam (October 1994) made it to number 3 and was certified double platinum by the BPI, whilst their third album, Up All Night (November 1995), reached number 7 and was certified platinum. Around the World Hit Singles: The Journey So Far was the group's first greatest hits compilation album, released in November 1996 and was certified double platinum.

== Design ==
Watkins was a fine art collector, specialising in works from the Memphis Group, which was an influential Italian design and architecture movement of the 1980s. In 2001 Watkins loaned much of his collection to the Design Museum in London for their "Memphis Remembered" exhibition to mark the 20th anniversary of the debut of the Memphis movement. An admirer of Bauhaus-inspired architecture, he designed and built The Big White House in Pett Level, East Sussex, in 2004, which was featured in the Channel 4 Grand Designs television series. In 2006 Watkins received the Sussex Heritage Trust Award for The Big White House project.

== Author ==
Published in July 2016, Watkins co-wrote with Matthew Lindsay his autobiography, titled Let's Make Lots of Money: Secrets of a Rich, Fat, Gay, Lucky Bastard. In December 2016 the book was longlisted for the Penderyn Music Book Prize, and in July 2017 the book was released in paperback under the title Let's Make Lots of Money: My Life as the Biggest Man in Pop.

== Death ==
Watkins suffered from poor health in his later years. He had type 2 diabetes and in 2014 had a liver transplant. He died on 24 February 2020, and his funeral was held on 10 March.
