= The Time (Bros album) =

Studio album by Bros
- Released: 16 October 1989
- Genres: Pop, dance-pop
- Length: 49:20
- Label: CBS
- Producer: Nicky Graham

Bros chronology
Push (1988)	The Time (1989)	Changing Faces (1991)

Singles from The Time
- 1. "Too Much" Released: 17 July 1989; 2. "Chocolate Box" Released: 25 September 1989; 3. "Sister" Released: 4 December 1989; 4. "Madly in Love" Released: 26 February 1990

The Time is the second album by British pop band Bros and the follow-up to their debut Push. It was released on 16 October 1989 and was their first album as a duo of twins Matt and Luke Goss, following the departure of bassist Craig Logan earlier in the year. It was also the first album to feature Matt and Luke as co-writers, along with Nicky Graham. Four singles were released from the album: "Too Much", "Chocolate Box", "Madly in Love" and "Sister". The track "Sister" was written about Matt and Luke's stepsister Carolyn, who was killed in a collision with a drunk driver in London in 1988.

The album reached number four on the UK Albums Chart and was certified gold for sales of over 100,000 copies in the UK.

== Critical reception ==
Professional ratings
Review scores
Source	Rating
AllMusic	4/5 stars
Encyclopedia of Popular Music	2/5 stars
NME	4/10
Q	2/5 stars
Record Mirror	(music) (lyrics)
Smash Hits	6½/10
Sounds	2.5/5 stars

Mike Soutar of Smash Hits recognised the duo's talent and stated that their playing had become more accomplished and that their sound was "more mature" compared with debut album Push. He called the opening four tracks "promising", but then went on to say, "Where Bros do come unstuck, however, is when they turn their attention to serious 'social' issues, namely drugs in 'Streetwise' and racism in 'Black & White'. Well intentioned as they may be, neither of these topics are particularly new to pop music, and Bros have nothing fresh to say about them... And that's Bros' big problem: about half the songs on this LP are just ideas thrown together and never really finished properly."

In NME, Simon Williams stated that "the most astonishing fact is that the boys have social consciences" and that "the messages are delivered in a trite manner, but their earnestness can't be denied". However, he called the music "crap, f—ed up funk workouts which Wham! perfected five years ago ... And the bottom line is that Bros are sorely short of chummy, hummable tunes." Lloyd Bradley of Q stated that the duo were attempting to break the US market by copying Michael Jackson's mix of pop and rock, complete with Jackson's vocal stylings, but "in trying for a level of aggression totally at odds with their long suit – punchy easily danceable pop – it sounds uncomfortably forced". His conclusion about the album was that "it's difficult to see its appeal: while remaining distinctly juvenile, by losing its predecessor's essential innocence, it's a little too, er, challenging for [the US's] established market".

Self-confessed "Bros apologist" Andy Ross of Sounds was disappointed with the album, calling the songs "well-above-average pop" but that "the major criticism is that the material is polished to the extent of losing all character ... The most so-so record of the year." In Music Week Andrew Martin called the album a "response to apparent waning popularity", stating that "The drums may sound meatier, the guitar raunchier and the lyrics as risky as they are banal", and concluded, "Bros's second album surprises no-one". Tim Southwell of Record Mirror praised Matt Goss's vocals and the album's production, and said that "all 10 songs are delivered with skill and a soulful zest". However, he criticised the "dire Stevie Wonder imitations" and the "lyrical naïvety", with the exception of "Sister", and said that "Bros should credit their fans with a bit more upstairs before they are outgrown by the very people who made them famous."

In a retrospective review, William Ruhlmann of AllMusic noted that Bros were coming to the end of their popularity, and that their music had not travelled well across the Atlantic, saying, "As with most teenage heartthrobs, the music wasn't the point; all of these songs are heavily produced, glossy dance tracks in which Matt Goss's enthusiastic but thin vocals are the least noticeable aspect. The point was image, and without a big promotional push, that image never became visible to Americans, while, in England, it was only good for the life of this record, completing Bros' two years of fame."

== Track listing ==
All tracks are written by Matt Goss, Luke Goss and Nicky Graham.

No.	Title	Length
1.	"Madly in Love"	7:09
2.	"Too Much"	3:30
3.	"Chocolate Box"	3:57
4.	"Money"	4:21
5.	"Streetwise"	4:29
6.	"Club Fool"	5:28
7.	"Black and White"	3:52
8.	"Don't Bite the Hand"	3:10
9.	"Space"	3:40
10.	"Sister"	4:23

CD bonus track
No.	Title	Length
11.	"Life's a Heartbeat" (B-side of "Chocolate Box")	4:43

2010 CD reissue bonus tracks
No.	Title	Remix	Length
12.	"Too Much (Extended Version)"	Tom Lord-Alge	6:43
13.	"Astrologically" (B-side of "Too Much")		3:30
14.	"Chocolate Box (Swing Mix)"	Justin Strauss	6:18
15.	"Sister (Remix)"	Tom Lord-Alge	4:23
16.	"Madly in Love (Joe Smooth 12" Version)"	Joe Smooth	6:24

US and Canada version

All tracks are written by Matt Goss, Luke Goss and Nicky Graham, except where noted.

No.	Title	Length
1.	"Madly in Love"	7:09
2.	"Too Much"	3:34
3.	"Chocolate Box"	4:00
4.	"Money"	4:23
5.	"Life's a Heartbeat"	4:48
6.	"Club Fool"	5:31
7.	"Black and White"	3:55
8.	"Don't Bite the Hand"	3:09
9.	"I Owe You Nothing (remix)" (The Brothers)	3:57
10.	"Sister"	4:23
11.	"Space" (bonus track on CD only, incorrectly listed as "Streetwise")	4:30

== Personnel ==
Bros

- Matt Goss – vocals, keyboards, programming and bass
- Luke Goss – drums, percussion, keyboards, programming and bass

Additional personnel

- Scott Davidson – keyboards, programming and bass
- Paul Gendler – guitars
- Nicky Graham – keyboards, programming and bass
- Paul Powell – bass on "Madly in Love"
- Jim Turner – saxophone
- Brass arrangements and playing by the Kick Horns

== Charts ==
=== Weekly charts ===
Chart (1989)	Peak position
Australian Albums (ARIA)	34
Canada Top Albums/CDs (RPM)	80
Dutch Albums (Album Top 100)	90
European Albums Chart	18
Finnish Albums (Suomen virallinen lista)	23
German Albums (Offizielle Top 100)	34
Italian Albums (Musica e dischi)	20
Japanese Albums (Oricon)	11
Spanish Albums (PROMUSICAE)	17
Swedish Albums (Sverigetopplistan)	42
UK Albums (Official Charts)	4

== Certifications ==
Region	Certification	Certified units/sales
Spain (Promusicae)	Platinum	100,000^{^}
United Kingdom (BPI)	Gold	100,000^{^}
^{^} Shipments figures based on certification alone.
