= Krush =

British dance music group

Krush were a UK dance music group, who had a crossover hit single with "House Arrest" in 1987.

== Career ==
The group consisted of musicians Mark Gamble, Cassius Campbell and record producers Mark Brydon and Robert Gordon. Ruth Joy was the featured vocalist.

"House Arrest", a sample-based dance track, was a No. 3 hit on the UK Singles Chart in December 1987 into January 1988. Alongside similar releases by artists such as Bomb the Bass and S'Express, "House Arrest" is considered a pioneering example of British house music. It has since been licensed to numerous compilation albums.

Their second single "Walking on Sunshine" was a club hit in 1992, and peaked at No. 71 on the UK Singles Chart. Brydon went on to have continued success with a variety of other projects within house/dance music. The most notable of these was as the producer of The Funky Worm, who had a top 40 hit in the UK in 1988, with "Hustle (To the Music)". However, Brydon's biggest success came from the mid-1990s onwards with vocalist Róisín Murphy, as the producer of Moloko. Gordon was also well known within Sheffield's music scene, and was the co-producer of Forgemasters' "Track with No Name", one of the seminal tracks of the Yorkshire Bleeps and Bass scene. Gordon was also a co-founder of Warp Records, until leaving the label acrimoniously in 1991.

In 1989, Ruth Joy (real name Ruth Joy Oram) launched a solo career, releasing the single "Don't Push It" (UK No. 66) (backed with "Gimme Your Love") on MCA Records. Both tracks were produced by Mantronik. She followed it up with the single "Soul Power", and in 1991 she released the Carl McIntosh-produced (of the band Loose Ends) "Feel" (UK No. 67). All of these tracks, plus some additional ones, ended up on her 1992 album, Pride and Joy.
