= When Will I Be Famous? =

1987 single by Bros

Single by Bros

from the album Push
- B-side: "Love to Hate You"
- Released: 9 November 1987
- Length: 5:02 (album version); 4:00 (single edit)
- Label: CBS
- Songwriters: Nicky Graham, Tom Watkins
- Producer: Nicky Graham

Bros singles chronology
"I Owe You Nothing" (1987)	"When Will I Be Famous?" (1987)	"Drop the Boy" (1988)

Music video
- "When Will I Be Famous?" on YouTube

"When Will I Be Famous?" is a song by British boy band Bros. Written by Nicky Graham and Tom Watkins, "When Will I Be Famous?" was released as a single in November 1987. The following year, it peaked at number two on the UK Singles Chart. The single also topped the Irish Singles Chart, and entered the top five in several other countries, as well as hitting the number one spot on the Japanese foreign chart. "When Will I Be Famous?" would later appear on Bros' 1988 album, Push.

== Critical reception ==
Richard Lowe of Smash Hits stated that "When Will I Be Famous?" is a "second rate" song which, in his point of view, was unlikely to be a hit. Retrospectively, Rolling Stone ranked the song at number 72 on their list of the "75 Greatest Boy Band Songs of All Time" in 2020. In 2017, ShortList's Dave Fawbert listed this song at number one on his list of the "Greatest Key Changes in Music History".

== Chart performance ==
"When Will I Be Famous?" was a number-one single in Ireland, as well as reaching number two in the United Kingdom, Denmark, Norway and Switzerland. It entered the UK Singles Chart on 28 November 1987 at number 81, in an initial five-week chart run until the end of December. It re-entered the top 100 at number 51 on the week ending 3 January 1988, reaching number two four weeks later.

== Track listings ==
UK and US 7-inch single; Japanese mini-CD single

1. "When Will I Be Famous?"
2. "Love to Hate You"

UK 12-inch single and European mini-CD single

1. "When Will I Be Famous?" (the Infamous mix)
2. "When Will I Be Famous?" (the Contender dub mix)
3. "Love to Hate You"

US 12-inch single

1. "When Will I Be Famous?" (club mix) – 8:02
2. "When Will I Be Famous?" (acapella mix) – 4:06
3. "When Will I Be Famous?" (7-inch version) – 3:59
4. "When Will I Be Famous?" (dub mix) – 7:35
5. "When Will I Be Famous?" (bonus beats) – 2:53

Japanese CD mini-album

1. "When Will I Be Famous?"
2. "When Will I Be Famous?" (Infamous mix)
3. "When Will I Be Famous?" (the Contender dub mix)

== Charts ==
=== Weekly charts ===
Chart (1987–1988)	Peak position
Australia (Australian Music Report)	5
Austria (Ö3 Austria Top 40)	9
Belgium (Ultratop 50 Flanders)	4
Denmark (IFPI)	2
Europe (European Hot 100 Singles)	6
Europe (European Hit Radio)	6
Finland (Suomen virallinen lista)	4
France (SNEP)	7
France Airplay (SNEP)	3
Iceland (Íslenski Listinn Topp 10)	4
Ireland (IRMA)	1
Israel (Israeli Singles Chart)	2
Italy (Musica e dischi)	10
Italy (TV Sorrisi e Canzoni)	15
Japan Foreign Singles (Oricon)	1
Netherlands (Dutch Top 40)	6
Netherlands (Single Top 100)	5
New Zealand (Recorded Music NZ)	43
Norway (VG-lista)	2
Spain (AFYVE)	10
Spain Airplay (Top 40 Radio)	7
Sweden (Sverigetopplistan)	20
Switzerland (Schweizer Hitparade)	2
UK Singles (Official Charts)	2
UK Airplay (Music & Media)	1
US Billboard Hot 100	83
US 12-inch Singles Sales (Billboard)	42
US Dance Club Play (Billboard)	10
West Germany (GfK)	4

=== Year-end charts ===
Chart (1988)	Rank
Australia (ARIA)	26
Belgium (Ultratop)	64
Europe (Eurochart Hot 100)	25
Europe (European Hit Radio)	40
France Airplay (SNEP)	48
Israel (Israeli Singles Chart)	46
Netherlands (Dutch Top 40)	74
Netherlands (Single Top 100)	56
Switzerland (Schweizer Hitparade)	23
UK Singles (Gallup)	34
West Germany (Media Control)	47

== Release history ==
Region	Date	Format(s)	Label(s)	Ref(s).
United Kingdom	9 November 1987	7-inch vinyl; 12-inch vinyl	CBS	
Japan	21 May 1988	Mini-album; mini-CD; cassette	Epic	
United States	June 1988	7-inch vinyl; 12-inch vinyl	Epic	
