= I Owe You Nothing =

1987 single by Bros

Single by Bros

from the album Push
- B-side: "I Owe You Nothing" (The Voice)
- Released: 31 August 1987
- Length: 3:34
- Label: CBS
- Songwriters: The Brothers (Nicky Graham and Tom Watkins)
- Producer: Nicky Graham

Bros singles chronology
| "I Owe You Nothing" (1987) | "When Will I Be Famous?" (1987) |
| "Drop the Boy" (1988) | "I Owe You Nothing" (1988) | "I Quit" (1988) |

Music video
- "I Owe You Nothing" (1987 version) on YouTube

Music video
- "I Owe You Nothing" (1988 reissue) on YouTube

"I Owe You Nothing" is a song by British boy band Bros. Written by Nicky Graham and Tom Watkins and produced by Graham, the song was originally released as their debut single in 1987 but failed to chart. In 1988, it was remixed and re-released by CBS following the success of their breakthrough single "When Will I Be Famous?" The original version of the song can be found on the band's 1988 debut album, Push.

"I Owe You Nothing" was Bros's sole UK number-one single, spending two weeks at the top in June 1988. The song additionally peaked within the top 10 in Australia, Belgium, Denmark, France, Iceland, Ireland, the Netherlands, South Africa, and Switzerland. In the United States, the song reached number 10 on the Billboard Dance Club Play chart. The single had sold nearly 300,000 copies in the UK as of June 2013.

== Critical reception ==
Bob Stanley from NME wrote, "This is a fair old jiggler closer in origin to 'When Will I Be Famous'. Though Matt tries his hardest he can't quite summon up the GROOOUURRGHHH! that made 'Drop the Boy' so, umm, memorable." In a review published in Smash Hits, Sylvia Patterson described the song as being "a very smart 'n' speedy disco fizzler and it's quite good".

== Track listings ==
- 7-inch single (1987 and 1988)

A. "I Owe You Nothing" – 3:34
B. "I Owe You Nothing" (The Voice) – 3:15

- 12-inch and cassette single (1987)
1. "I Owe You Nothing" (the Shep Pettibone mix)
2. "I Owe You Nothing" (Pettibeats)
3. "I Owe You Nothing" (The Voice)
4. "I Owe You Nothing" (7-inch mix)
- 12-inch single (1988)

A1. "I Owe You Nothing" (club mix) – 7:36
B1. "I Owe You Nothing" (The Voice) – 3:15
B2. "I Owe You Nothing" (The Beats) – 2:36

- 12-inch "Over 18 Mix" single (1988)
1. "I Owe You Nothing" (Over 18 mix) – 18:01

Note: The record is single-sided, with the B-side labelled as "Nothing".

- CD single (1988)
1. "I Owe You Nothing" – 3:34
2. "I Owe You Nothing" (Club mix) – 7:36
3. "I Owe You Nothing" (The Voice) – 3:15
4. "I Owe You Nothing" (The Beats) – 2:36
- US 7-inch single (1988)

A. "I Owe You Nothing" – 3:34
B. "Shocked" – 4:19

== Charts ==
=== Weekly charts ===
| Chart (1987) | Peak position |
|---|---|
| UK Singles (Official Charts) | 80 |

| Chart (1988) | Peak position |
|---|---|
| Australia (ARIA) | 6 |
| Belgium (Ultratop 50 Flanders) | 4 |
| Denmark (IFPI) | 4 |
| Europe (Eurochart Hot 100) | 5 |
| Europe (European Hit Radio) | 3 |
| Finland (Suomen virallinen lista) | 11 |
| France (SNEP) | 7 |
| France Airplay (SNEP) | 3 |
| Iceland (Íslenski Listinn Topp 10) | 2 |
| Ireland (IRMA) | 2 |
| Israel (Israeli Singles Chart) | 3 |
| Italy (Musica e dischi) | 20 |
| Italy (TV Sorrisi e Canzoni) | 28 |
| Netherlands (Dutch Top 40) | 4 |
| Netherlands (Single Top 100) | 5 |
| New Zealand (Recorded Music NZ) | 5 |
| South Africa (Springbok Radio) | 10 |
| Spain (AFYVE) | 19 |
| Spain Airplay (Top 40 Radio) | 15 |
| Switzerland (Schweizer Hitparade) | 9 |
| UK Singles (Official Charts) | 1 |
| UK Airplay (Music & Media) | 2 |
| US Dance Club Play (Billboard) | 10 |
| West Germany (GfK) | 13 |
| Zimbabwe (ZIMA) | 12 |

=== Year-end charts ===
| Chart (1988) | Rank |
|---|---|
| Belgium (Ultratop) | 20 |
| Europe (Eurochart Hot 100) | 44 |
| Europe (European Hit Radio) | 42 |
| France Airplay (SNEP) | 47 |
| Israel (Israeli Singles Chart) | 22 |
| Netherlands (Dutch Top 40) | 34 |
| Netherlands (Single Top 100) | 57 |
| UK Singles (Gallup) | 25 |

== Certifications ==
Certifications for "I Owe You Nothing"
| Region | Certification | Certified units/sales |
|---|---|---|
| France (SNEP) | Silver | 250,000^{*} |
| United Kingdom (BPI) | Silver | 250,000^{^} |
^{*} Sales figures based on certification alone.^{^} Shipments figures based on certification alone.
