= Bros (British band) =

English pop-rock band

- Origin: Camberley, Surrey, England
- Genres: Teen pop, pop rock
- Years active: 1986–1992; 2017–2019
- Labels: CBS; Epic
- Members: Matt Goss; Luke Goss
- Past members: Craig Logan

Bros (/brɒs/) were an English band formed in 1986 in Camberley, Surrey. The band originally consisted of twin brothers Matt and Luke Goss, and their friend Craig Logan, who attended Collingwood School in Camberley. The band were managed by former Pet Shop Boys manager Tom Watkins. They achieved chart success and a large teenage fanbase in 1988 with songs such as "When Will I Be Famous?" and "I Owe You Nothing". Early the following year, Logan quit the band and the Goss twins continued as a duo. After two more albums the band split up in 1992.

According to the British Phonographic Industry (BPI), Bros have been certified for sales of 1.3 million albums and 750,000 singles in the UK. Bros are estimated to have sold 16 million records worldwide. In 2017, the Goss twins reunited to perform two dates as Bros at the O2 Arena in London.

== History ==
=== Early years ===
Luke Goss and Matt Goss (born 29 September 1968 in Lewisham, London) had settled in Camberley, Surrey, after their parents had split up and their mother had found a new boyfriend, who bought Luke an electronic drum kit and Matt a saxophone, noticing their interest in music. The twins attended Collingwood College, where they became part of a band called Blue. At school they met Craig Logan (born 22 April 1969 in Kirkcaldy, Fife, Scotland) who was playing bass guitar in another school band, Stillbrook. Logan recalled that the Goss brothers came to his house one evening to say they had split from their band, and asked Logan to join them in a new group. Logan agreed, and the trio went through a variety of names for the group before settling on Gloss.

The group were noticed by Bob Herbert, who had ambitions to break into the music business as a manager – Herbert's son Chris was a classmate of the trio at Collingwood. Herbert allowed the group to practise in his summer house and paid for them to record demos, but he was unable to sign them to a contract as they were under 18 years old.

During this period Gloss had met Nicky Graham, a songwriter and producer. Graham was working and writing songs with music manager Tom Watkins, and he suggested that Watkins meet the group. Although he was unimpressed with either their look or their music, Watkins realised that he could shape the group into a boy band for the teen girl market, with Graham and Watkins writing the songs for them. Gloss split from Herbert, and signed a contract with Watkins and his management company as soon as they turned 18. Watkins renamed the band Bros, and he and Graham wrote the group's songs under the pseudonym of "The Brothers", in order to create the impression that the Goss brothers had written the songs themselves.

=== Success ===
Bros's debut single, "I Owe You Nothing", was released in August 1987, but it only peaked at number 80 in the UK Singles Chart. However, their breakthrough came with the release of their second single, "When Will I Be Famous?", in November 1987. The song reached number two in the UK, and number one in Ireland. The song also reached the top ten in 10 other countries across Europe and Australia, and peaked at number 10 in the US Billboard Hot Dance Club Play chart.

Bros followed up the success of "When Will I Be Famous?" with their third single, "Drop the Boy". Like its predecessor, it also peaked at number two in the UK and was certified Silver by the BPI. and at number one in Ireland. as well as reaching the top ten in Australia, New Zealand, Norway, Switzerland and West Germany.

Bros released their debut album Push on 28 March 1988. Push entered the UK Albums Chart at number two. Although it never reached number one, the album was eventually certified quadruple platinum in the UK, as well as double platinum in Australia, platinum in New Zealand, and gold in France, Germany, Spain and Switzerland. A deluxe 3-CD edition of Push was reissued in 2013 by Cherry Pop records for its 25th anniversary, featuring bonus tracks.

Bros reissued a remixed version of "I Owe You Nothing" as a single in June 1988, which became their only number one single in the UK. The song peaked at number two in Ireland and in the top ten in eight other countries across the world, as well as giving them their second top ten hit on the Billboard Hot Dance Club Play chart. Two further singles were released from Push, "I Quit" in September 1988, which entered the UK charts at number four, and "Cat Among the Pigeons", which was released in November 1988 as a double A-side with a version of the Christmas carol "Silent Night" and entered the UK charts at number two.

Their first UK tour, known as Bros Push Live, sold out 14 shows within an hour of the tickets going on sale. Due to the demand, extra dates were added.

The group's popularity was named "Brosmania" by the music press, and their following of teenage girls were known as "Brosettes". In September 1988 the Metropolitan Police had to close off part of Oxford Street in central London when an overwhelming number of fans turned up to a record signing by the band at the flagship store of record shop HMV. Bros had over six million fans worldwide join the band's fan club, known as the Bros Front. With such demand for merchandise and fans wanting to talk to their idols, a phone line was set up, with 70,000 fans using the service within the first month.

Logan left the band in early 1989, due to several bouts of illness, including chronic fatigue syndrome, and the fact he could no longer walk and was being assisted on and off stage. Logan was admitted to hospital for six weeks, and once released from hospital he spent a further six months of rehabilitation to learn to walk again. Logan decided that the pressure of stardom was no longer for him and told Matt and Luke he was thinking of leaving the band. He appeared with the brothers at the 1988 Smash Hits Poll Winners Party; this was his final appearance as a member of Bros. He appeared on the BBC1 television programme Wogan discussing why he had left the band. During the interview Logan talked about the legal action he took against the management of Bros over unpaid royalties, but confirmed he left the band due to illness.

Bros continued as a duo, with Matt Goss and Luke Goss continuing with the sold-out world tour titled 'The Global Push', where the band played to fans in Australia, Japan, mainland Europe and the UK.

After a short break recovering from their Global Push Tour, Bros went back to the recording studio and released their second album, The Time. The album was released on 16 October 1989 and reached number 4 in the UK Albums Chart. Bros released several tracks from the album as singles, including "Too Much", "Chocolate Box", "Madly in Love", and "Sister".

Bros did a one-off concert, "Bros in 2 Summer", which was seen by over 77,000 fans at Wembley Stadium in August 1989. The support acts for the show were Salt 'n' Pepa and Debbie Gibson.

In 1991 Bros released their third and final album, Changing Faces, before the band split up in 1992. They released two tracks from the album: "Are You Mine?", reaching number 12 in the UK and "Try", which got to number 27. The album was not highly publicised and entered the chart at number 18.

Bros achieved eleven top 40 singles and three top 20 albums in the United Kingdom. Worldwide, the group is estimated to have sold 16 million records. The band never had commercial success in the US, where they remain relatively unknown.

== Careers after Bros ==
Matt Goss began a solo career during the 1990s, enjoying chart success with singles "The Key" and "If You Were Here Tonight", and had his own Vegas Residency at The Palms, Caesars Palace and The Mirage.

Luke Goss moved to the US and became a film actor, appearing in Hollywood movies such as Blade II and Hellboy II: The Golden Army. He starred in the UK film Interview with a Hitman in 2012 and released his directorial debut Your Move in 2018.

Craig Logan became a songwriter and later an artist manager following his departure from the band in 1989. At the time he was in a relationship with singer Kim Appleby and co-wrote many of her solo songs. From 2006 to 2010 he was the head of RCA Records in the UK, before launching his own management company.

== Reunion ==
On 1 July 2008, singer Matt Goss told BBC News that he had spoken to the other members of the band and in principle they had agreed to reform, feeling that he and his bandmates "are finally at a place" where they could reunite. However, his brother Luke denied any plans of taking part in a reunion. On 14 September 2010, Matt Goss stated that the band would not be reuniting in the near future, saying that the moment had passed.

On 19 August 2017 — 28 years to the day since the band's original farewell concert at Wembley Stadium. — Matt and Luke Goss played a 30th anniversary Bros concert at London's O2 Arena. Craig Logan wished the Goss brothers success with the concerts, but confirmed he was not interested in taking part in the reunion. A UK tour was scheduled, with a second date at the O2 Arena and shows in Manchester, Glasgow, Birmingham and Newcastle upon Tyne, but all the dates except the two shows in London and the show in Manchester were later cancelled, with the band blaming "unforeseen logistical circumstances".

A documentary film of the brothers' reunion and the rehearsals and lead-up to the first concert at the O2 Arena, titled Bros: After the Screaming Stops, was shown on 18 October 2018 as part of the BFI London Film Festival and given a limited cinema release on 9 November 2018, with a DVD and digital release on 12 November. The film debuted at number one on the UK's Official Music Video Chart. It received its television debut on BBC Four on 23 December and became one of that year's Christmas television highlights due to its subsequent popularity on BBC iPlayer.

Following the documentary's success, the duo played another concert at London's O_{2} Brixton Academy on 5 July 2019, followed by further UK tour dates. They also planned to re-record their debut album Push in a more contemporary style, and to release an album of new material in the future.

== Awards and nominations ==
Award	Date of ceremony	Category	Result	Ref(s)
Brit Awards	13 February 1989	British Breakthrough Act	Won	

== Discography ==
Bros discography
- Studio albums: 3
- Compilation albums: 3
- Singles: 14
- Video albums: 3
- Music videos: 13
- Remix albums: 1
- Documentary videos: 1

=== Studio albums ===
Title	Album details	Peak chart positions											Certifications (sales thresholds)
Title	Album details	UK	AUS	AUT	GER	JPN	NLD	NZ	NOR	SWE	SWI	US	Certifications (sales thresholds)
Push	Released: 28 March 1988; Label: CBS; Formats: LP, CD, cassette	2	4	14	6	1	32	1	6	29	3	171	UK: 4× Platinum; AUS: 2× Platinum; GER: Gold; NZ: Platinum; SWI: Gold
The Time	Released: 16 October 1989; Label: CBS; Formats: LP, CD, cassette	4	34	—	34	7	90	—	—	42	—	—	UK: Gold
Changing Faces	Released: 30 September 1991; Label: Columbia; Formats: LP, CD, cassette	18	176	—	—	78	—	—	—	—	—	—	

=== Compilation and remix albums ===
Title	Album details	Certifications (sales thresholds)
The Best of Bros	Released: 1 March 2004; Label: Columbia; Formats: CD	UK: Silver
I Owe You Nothing: The Best of Bros	Released: 2011; Label: Sony Music; Formats: CD	
Bros: The Remix	Released: 1991; Label: Epic; Formats: CD	
Bros: Gold	Released: 27 March 2020; Label: Demon; Formats: LP, CD	

On the week ending 9 April 2020, Bros: Gold entered the UK Official Physical Albums Chart at No.8 based on sales of CDs, vinyl and other formats.

=== Singles ===
Year	Title	Peak chart positions												Certifications	Album
Year	Title	UK	AUS	AUT	BEL	FRA	GER	IRE	NED	NZ	NOR	SWE	SWI	Certifications	Album
1987	"I Owe You Nothing"	80	—	—	—	—	—	—	—	—	—	—	—		Push
1987	"When Will I Be Famous?"	2	5	9	4	7	4	1	5	43	2	20	2		Push
1988	"Drop the Boy"	2	9	17	34	—	9	1	23	8	2	—	5	UK: Silver	Push
1988	"I Owe You Nothing" (re-release)	1	6	—	4	7	13	2	5	5	—	—	9		Push
1988	"I Quit"	4	14	—	17	25	38	23	30	47	—	—	—		Push
1988	"Cat Among the Pigeons" / "Silent Night"	2	15	—	—	41	26	4	91	27	—	—	—	UK: Silver	Push
1989	"Too Much"	2	11	—	21	37	28	1	42	6	—	—	24	UK: Silver	The Time
1989	"Chocolate Box"	9	23	—	35	—	—	2	87	29	—	—	—		The Time
1989	"Sister"	10	98	—	36	—	—	5	—	—	—	—	—		The Time
1990	"Madly in Love"	14	68	—	29	—	—	7	—	—	—	—	—		The Time
1991	"Are You Mine?"	12	98	—	27	—	—	6	—	—	—	30	—		Changing Faces
1991	"Try"	27	168	—	39	—	—	—	—	—	—	—	—		Changing Faces
2017	"Love Can Make You Fly"	—	—	—	—	—	—	—	—	—	—	—	—		Non-album single
"—" denotes a recording that did not chart or was not released in that territory.

== Music videos ==
- 1987 – "I Owe You Nothing"
- 1987 – "When Will I Be Famous?"
- 1988 – "Drop the Boy"
- 1988 – "I Owe You Nothing" (reissue)
- 1988 – "I Quit"
- 1988 – "Cat Among the Pigeons"
- 1988 – "Silent Night"
- 1989 – "Too Much"
- 1989 – "Chocolate Box"
- 1989 – "Sister"
- 1990 – "Madly in Love"
- 1991 – "Are You Mine?"
- 1991 – "Try"

== Videography ==
Bros's first video album, Push Live Tour, was released mid-1988 on VHS, and LaserDisc in Japan; it was recorded at the Hammersmith Apollo. Their second video release, Push Over, was a collection of music videos for singles taken from their Push album. These music videos, together with others recorded later by the duo, were also published on their third video album The Big Picture in March 2005.

- Bros Live (1988)
- Push Over (1989)
- The Big Picture (2005)
- Bros: After the Screaming Stops (2018)

== Concert tours ==
=== The Big Push Tour ===
Date	City	Country	Venue
United Kingdom
23 June 1988	Sheffield	England	Sheffield City Hall
24 June 1988	Newcastle	England	Newcastle City Hall
25 June 1988	Edinburgh	Scotland	Playhouse Theatre (afternoon & evening shows)
27 June 1988	Manchester	England	Manchester Apollo
28 June 1988	Newport	Wales	Newport Centre
30 June 1988	London	England	Hammersmith Apollo
1 July 1988	London	England	Hammersmith Apollo
2 July 1988	London	England	Hammersmith Apollo
4 July 1988	Nottingham	England	Nottingham Theatre Royal
5 July 1988	Southampton	England	Mayflower Centre
6 July 1988	Brighton	England	Brighton Dome
7 July 1988	London	England	Wembley Arena
8 July 1988	London	England	Wembley Arena

=== The Global Push Tour ===
Date	City / Town	Country	Venue
Australia
28 October 1988	Melbourne	Australia	National Tennis Centre
29 October 1988	Melbourne	Australia	National Tennis Centre
31 October 1988	Brisbane	Australia	Brisbane Entertainment Centre
3 November 1988	Sydney	Australia	Sydney Entertainment Centre
4 November 1988	Sydney	Australia	Sydney Entertainment Centre
Europe
9 December 1988	Copenhagen	Denmark	Valby-Hallen
12 December 1988	Glasgow	Scotland	Glasgow SEC
13 December 1988	Whitley Bay	England	Whitley Bay Ice Rink
15 December 1988	Brighton	England	Brighton Centre
16 December 1988	Brighton	England	Brighton Centre
17 December 1988	Bournemouth	England	Bournemouth International Centre
19 December 1988	Birmingham	England	Birmingham NEC
20 December 1988	Birmingham	England	Birmingham NEC
22 December 1988	Belfast	Northern Ireland	Belfast Kings Hall
23 December 1988	Dublin	Ireland	Dublin NEC
27 December 1988	London	England	Wembley Arena
28 December 1988	London	England	Wembley Arena
29 December 1988	London	England	Wembley Arena
30 December 1988	London	England	Wembley Arena
2 January 1989	Birmingham	England	Birmingham NEC
3 January 1989	Birmingham	England	Birmingham NEC
4 January 1989	Birmingham	England	Birmingham NEC
5 January 1989	Birmingham	England	Birmingham NEC
8 January 1989	Whitley Bay	England	Whitley Bay Ice Rink
9 January 1989	Whitley Bay	England	Whitley Bay Ice Rink
11 January 1989	Bournemouth	England	Bournemouth International Centre
16 January 1989	Paris	France	Le Zénith
23 January 1989	Dortmund	Germany	Westfalenhallen
26 January 1989	Budapest	Hungary	Budapest Sportcsarnok
29 January 1989	Milan	Italy	Palatrussardi
23 February 1989	Milan	Italy	Sanremo Music Festival

=== In 2 Summer (concert) ===
Date	City	Country	Venue
19 August 1989	London	England	Wembley Stadium (attendance: 77,000)

=== Bros Live ===
Date	City	Country	Venue
19 August 2017	London	England	The O2 Arena
20 August 2017	London	England	The O2 Arena
