= Nicky Graham =

British musician (1945–2024)

Nicholas Lynedoch Graham (January 1945 – 3 February 2024) was a British musician, songwriter and music producer. He was born in Durban, South Africa, in January 1945, before his family returned to the UK in 1960.

His musical career began when joining UK band The End in 1965. Following their demise, he became an original member of Tucky Buzzard. In 1972, he played keyboards for David Bowie including on the Ziggy Stardust Tour during August and September 1972, and appears on the album Bowie at the Beeb. He was A & R manager and staff producer first at Polydor Records and then at CBS Records.

As a producer and songwriter, he was involved with various hit records including for The Nolans, Bros (including the UK No. 1 "I Owe You Nothing"), Let Loose, Ant & Dec (including the UK No. 1 "Let's Get Ready to Rhumble"), Code Red, Shakin' Stevens and Aaron Carter, among others.

During the 2000s, he was a Eurovision A&R consultant to the BBC for a few years, as well as becoming a director for PRS for Music for over a decade.

On 14 October 2014, Graham was presented with a BASCA Gold Badge Award in recognition of his contribution to music. Graham died from cancer on 3 February 2024, at the age of 79.
