= Key =

Key, Keys, The Key or The Keys may refer to:

== Common uses ==
- Key (cryptography), a piece of information needed to encode or decode a message
- Key (instrument), a component of a musical instrument
- Key (lock), a device used to operate a lock
- Key (map), a guide to a map's symbology
- Key (music), the scale of a piece of music
- Key in a keyboard layout
  - Typewriter
  - Computer keyboard
  - Virtual keyboard
- Legend (chart), an element of a chart

== Arts, entertainment and media ==
=== Films ===
- The Key (1934 film), an American pre-Code film
- Key Largo (1948 film), starring Humphrey Bogart and Lauren Bacall
- The Key (1958 film), starring William Holden and Sophia Loren
- The Key, also known as Odd Obsession, a 1959 Japanese comedy drama
- The Key (1961 film), a Soviet animated feature
- The Key (1965 film), a Croatian omnibus film
- The Key (1971 film), a Czechoslovak drama
- The Key (1983 film), an Italian erotic film
- The Key (1987 film), an Iranian film
- The Key (2007 film), a French thriller
- Key (film), a 2011 Telugu-language psychological thriller
- The Key (2014 film), an American erotic drama

=== Literature ===
- The Key (Curley novel), by Marianne Curley, 2005
- The Key (Elfgren and Strandberg novel), by Mats Strandberg and Sara Bergmark Elfgren, 2013
- The Key (Tanizaki novel), by Jun'ichirō Tanizaki, 1956
- "The Key" (short story), by Isaac Asimov, 1966
- The Key, a 1974 children's book by Sheila K. McCullagh, part of the Tim and the Hidden People series
- The Key: A Startling Enquiry into the Riddle of Man's Past, a 1969 book by John Philip Cohane
- The Key, a magazine published by Kappa Kappa Gamma
- "The Key", a short story by Satyajit Ray
- The Keys (journal), of the League of Coloured Peoples founded in 1933

=== Music ===
==== Bands ====
- The Keys (English band), 1979–1983
- The Keys, a Welsh band successor to Murry the Hump

==== Albums ====
- Key (Meredith Monk album), 1971
- Key (Son, Ambulance album)|Key (Son, Ambulance album)]], 2004
- The Key (Joan Armatrading album), 1983
- The Key (Vince Gill album), 1998
- The Key (Nocturnus album), 1990
- The Key (Operation: Mindcrime album), 2015
- Keys (album), by Alicia Keys, 2021
- The Keys (EP), by GWSN, 2020

==== Songs ====
- "The Key" (Speech Debelle song), 2009
- "The Key" (Matt Goss song), 1995
- "The Key", by Ou Est Le Swimming Pool from the 2010 album The Golden Year
- "Key", by Band-Maid from the 2014 album Maid in Japan
- "The Key", 2010, by Edita Abdieski
- "Key", by C418 from the 2011 album Minecraft – Volume Alpha
- "The Keys", by Crazy Town from the 2015 album The Brimstone Sluggers
- "Key", by Porter Robinson from the 2017 EP Virtual Self

=== Television ===
- "The Key" (Code Lyoko), a 2005 episode
- "The Key" (Danger Man), a 1960 episode
- "The Key" (Fear the Walking Dead), a 2020 episode
- "The Key" (Prison Break), a 2006 episode
- "The Key" (The Walking Dead), a 2018 episode
- "The Key", an episode of Yes, Prime Minister, 1986
- "The Keys" (12 Monkeys), a 2015 episode
- "The Keys" (Seinfeld), a 1992 episode

=== Other uses in arts, entertainment and media ===
- Key (character), a supervillain in the DC Comics universe
- Key, the title character of Key the Metal Idol, a Japanese original video animation series
- The Key, a painting by Jackson Pollock

== People ==
- Key (surname), including a list of people with the surname
- Keys (surname), including a list of people with the surname
- Key (entertainer) (born 1991), South Korean entertainer
- Key Lawrence (born 2001), American football player

== Places ==
=== United States ===
- Key, Alabama
- Key, Ohio
- Keys, Oklahoma
- Florida Keys

=== Elsewhere ===
- The Keys, Newfoundland and Labrador, Canada
- Rural Municipality of Keys No. 303, Saskatchewan, Canada
- Key Cay, British Virgin Islands
- Key, Iran, a village in Isfahan Province, Iran
- Key Island, Tasmania, Australia
- The Key, New Zealand, a locality of Mararoa, New Zealand

=== Other places ===
- Cay, or key, a small island on the surface of a coral reef

== Science and technology ==
- Candidate key, or simply a key, in relational database management systems
  - Unique key
- A key in an associative array
- Key (engineering), a machine element used to connect a rotating machine element to a shaft
- KeY, a tool is used in formal verification of Java programs
- The Key (smartcard), a British smartcard for public transport ticketing
- .key, file extension used by Keynote presentation software
- Identification key, used to identify biological entities
- Telegraph key, or Morse key, a specialized electrical switch

== Sports ==
- Key (basketball), a marked area on a basketball court
- Frederick Keys, an American baseball team

== Other uses ==
- Key (company), a Japanese visual novel studio
- Key Airlines, an American former airline
- Key School, in Annapolis, Maryland, U.S.
- Keys, a truce term used in western Scotland
- Key light, the primary light in a lighting setup
- Amazon Key, a service by Amazon Prime
- House of Keys, the lower branch of the parliament of the Isle of Man
- Samara (fruit), or key, a type of fruit
- Yeoman Warders Club in the Tower of London, or "The Keys"
- KeyBank, an American regional bank based in Cleveland, Ohio
- Cay, a small island, sometimes spelled "Key"

== See also ==
- Keay, a surname
- Keays, a surname
- Keyes (disambiguation)
- Keying (disambiguation)
- Qi (disambiguation)
- Quay (disambiguation)
- Keyboard instrument
