= Quay (disambiguation) =

A quay, or wharf, is a structure on the shore where ships dock to load and unload.

Quay also may refer to:

== People ==
- Allen Quay (1936—2016), American tennis player
- Jan de Quay (1901-1985), Dutch politician
- Joanne Quay (born 1980), Malaysian badminton player
- Julie Anne Quay (fl. 2017), Australian businesswoman
- Matthew Quay (1833-1904), Pennsylvania senator
- Minnie Quay, a legendary ghost in Michigan, U.S.
- Steven C. Quay (fl. from 1975), American author, scientist, and businessman
- Pierre-Maurice Quays, Quay, or Quaï (1777-1803), French neoclassical painter
- Brothers Quay (Stephen and Timothy Quay, born 1947), American filmmakers
- Quay Global (Christopher Rosser, fl. from 2017), American record producer
- Quay Walker (JaQuavian Jy'Quese Walker, born 2000), American footballer

== Places ==
- Quay, New Mexico, U.S.
  - Quay County, New Mexico
- Quay, Oklahoma, U.S.

== Other uses ==
- Quay (restaurant), in Sydney, Australia
- Quay (film), a 2015 short documentary film
- QUAY-FM, a broadcasting station on Alderney

== See also ==
- Key (disambiguation)
- New Quay (disambiguation)
- River Kwai (disambiguation)
- Cay, a small island on the surface of a coral reef
- Quaye, a surname
