= Keays =

Keays is a surname. Notable people with the surname include:

- Ben Keays (born 1997), Australian rules footballer
- Fred Keays (1898–1983), Australian rules footballer
- Jim Keays (1946–2014), Australian musician
- Peter Keays (born 1955), Australian rules footballer
- Russell Keays (1913–1995), Canadian politician
- Sara Keays (born 1947), English writer and former mistress of British Conservative politician Cecil Parkinson
- Terry Keays (born 1970), Australian rules footballer
- Verna Keays (1893–1982), American artist and interior designer
- Vernon Keays (1900-1964), American film director

== See also ==
- Keay
