= Kuai =

Kuai may refer to:

- Kuai (dish) (Chinese: 膾), a Chinese food dish
- Kuai (Chinese: 塊), a colloquial term for the Chinese yuan (currency unit)
- KuAI, Kuibyshev Aviation Institute in Russia
- KUAI, a Radio station in the United States on the Island of Kauai, Hawaii
- Kuai Dafu, a former student leader of the Red Guards

== See also ==
- Kauai, Hawaii, U.S.
- Quai
- Kwai (disambiguation)
