= One Good Reason =

One Good Reason may refer to:

- One Good Reason (album), an album by Paul Carrack, or the title song
- One Good Reason (song), the Dutch entry in the Eurovision Song Contest 1999, performed in English by Marlayne
- "One Good Reason", song by The Alan Parsons Project from Ammonia Avenue, 1984
- "One Good Reason", song by The Tubes from Love Bomb, 1985
- "One Good Reason", song by Dru Hill from Enter the Dru, 1998
- "One Good Reason", song by Gary Moore from Dark Days in Paradise, 1997
- "One Good Reason", song by Celldweller from Celldweller
- "One Good Reason", song by Bryan Adams, B-side to "Straight from the Heart," 1983
- "One Good Reason", song by The Keys, 1981
- "One Good Reason", song by Mike Love, 1981
- "One Good Reason", song by Poison Girls, 1983
- "One Good Reason", song by The Swingers, 1979
