= The Beautiful Unknown =

Studio album by Matt Goss
- Released: 25 March 2022
- Genre: Pop
- Label: Lewisham Records

Matt Goss chronology
Life You Imagine (2013)	The Beautiful Unknown (2022)

Singles from The Beautiful Unknown
- 1. "Somewhere To Fall" Released: 20 August 2021; 2. "Better With You" Released: 8 October 2021; 3. "Saved" Released: 5 November 2021; 4. "The Beautiful Unknown (Matt Goss & Royal Philharmonic Orchestra)" Released: 2 December 2022

The Beautiful Unknown is the fifth studio album by English singer-songwriter Matt Goss. It was released in March 2022 by Lewisham Records after several put backs due to poor sales. When finally released the album reached No. 7 on the UK albums chart for just one week, and No. 5 on the Official Scottish Albums Chart. The total worldwide sales were less than 6000 copies It was made available via digital download, and also on vinyl LP, compact disc (CD) and cassette formats.

== Track listing ==
1. Somewhere to Fall – 3:27
2. Unafraid – 2:02
3. Feeling High – 3:20
4. Saved – 3:37
5. The Joke – 3:24
6. Soldiers of War – 2:42
7. Better with You – 3:33
8. Shipwreck – 3:59
9. The Beautiful Unknown - 4:37
10. Making It Rain - 2:55
11. Landlside - 3:29

== Track listing with credits ==
1	Somewhere to Fall Engineer [Mix Engineer] – Loren Moore Guitar – Joshua Lutz (2) Producer – Dave Audé Producer [Additional Production] – Jacob Bunton, Matt Goss Written by Jacob Bunton, Matt Goss	3:26
2	Unafraid Mixed by Jay Ruston Written by, arranged by, Producer – Jacob Bunton, Matt Goss	3:02
3	Feeling High Mixed by Jay Ruston Written by, arranged by, Producer – Jacob Bunton, Matt Goss	3:19
4	Saved Engineer [Mix Engineer] – Loren Moore Guitar – Joshua Lutz Producer – Dave Audé Producer [Additional Production] – Jason Robinson (3), Matt Goss, Troy Gonzalez Written by – Dave Aude*, Matt Goss	3:36
5	The Joke Clarinet – Fred Mandel Mixed by Jay Ruston Written by, arranged by, Producer – Jacob Bunton, Matt Goss Clarinet – Fred Mandel	3:33
6	Soldiers of War Engineer – Troy Gonzalez Guitar – Brian Bissell Mixed by Peter Mokran Producer [Additional Production] – Pyro Producer, arranged by Matt Goss Written by Matt Goss, Pyro	2:42
7	Better with You Engineer [Mix Engineer] – Loren Moore Instruments, arranged by – Dave Audé Producer [Additional Production] – Jacob Bunton, Matt Goss Producer, Remix – Dave Audé Programmed by [Additional programming] – Jason Robinson (3)	3:33
8	Shipwreck Mixed by Jay Ruston Producer – Jacob Bunton, Matt Goss Producer [Additional Production] – Babyface Written by, arranged by Matt Goss	3:59
9	The Beautiful Unknown Mixed by Jay Ruston Organ [Hammond B-3] – Michael Lord (12) Producer – Jacob Bunton, Matt Goss Written by Jacob Bunton, Matt Goss, Mischke	4:36
10	Making It Rain Engineer – Troy Gonzalez Mixed by Peter Mokran Producer [Additional Production] – Pyro Producer, arranged by Matt Goss Written by Matt Goss, Pyro	2:55
11	Landslide Engineer – Troy Gonzalez Guitar – Brian Bissell Mixed by Peter Mokran Producer – Matt Goss Written by Stevie Nicks	3:27

== Charts ==
Weekly chart performance for The Beautiful Unknown
Chart (2022)	Peak position
Scottish Albums (Official Charts)	5
UK Albums (Official Charts)	7
