= Subkey =

Subkey can refer to:

- A hard-coded parameter in a key schedule
- A key in OpenPGP that is bound by a master key

== See also ==
- Key (disambiguation)
- Key (cryptography)
