= Kwai =

Kwai may refer to:

- Kwai (app), a Chinese video sharing app
- River Kwai (disambiguation), two rivers in Thailand
- Kwai (DC Comics)
- KWAI (FM), a radio station (97.7 FM) licensed to serve Los Altos, California, United States
- KWAI (AM), a defunct radio station (1080 AM) formerly licensed to serve Honolulu, Hawaii, United States
- The Bridge over the River Kwai, a book about a real bridge and its film adaptation,

== See also ==
- Kwaio language
- Kwaio people
