= 134th Pennsylvania Infantry Regiment =

Union Army infantry regiment

134th Pennsylvania Volunteer Infantry
- Pennsylvania flag
- Active: August 1862 to May 26, 1863
- Country: United States of America
- Allegiance: Union
- Branch: Infantry
- Part of: 1st Brigade, 3rd Division, V Corps, Army of the Potomac
- Engagements: Second Battle of Bull Run; Battle of Antietam; Battle of Chancellorsville

Commanders
- Notable commanders: Matthew Quay; Edward O'Brien

The 134th Pennsylvania Volunteer Infantry was an infantry regiment in the Union Army during the American Civil War.

== History ==
After a call for volunteers in July 1862 by Andrew Curtin, Governor of Pennsylvania, the 134th Regiment was mustered in for nine months of service. The companies were from the following counties:

- Field Staff
- Company A – Lawrence County
- Company B – Lawrence County
- Company C – Butler County
- Company D – Lawrence County
- Company E – Beaver County
- Company F – Butler County
- Company G – Butler County
- Company H – Lawrence County
- Company I – Beaver County
- Company K – Butler County

Most of the men had no prior military service. Some had served in the Mexican–American War, but many were fresh recruits. After being trained at Camp Curtin, they were moved to Washington D.C. on August 20, 1862, following the Confederate advance on the capital during the Northern Virginia Campaign. After one day at Washington, they were moved to Arlington Heights, where they engaged in drill and other duties. They joined a brigade with the 91st, 126th, and 129th Pennsylvania regiments, under the command of General Erastus B. Tyler. It was here that the organization of the regiment was completed. For the field officers, Matthew Quay of Beaver County was commissioned as colonel, Edward O'Brien of Lawrence County as lieutenant colonel, and John M. Thompson of Butler County as major.

On August 30, the 134th marched towards Manassas, Virginia, but arrived too late to participate in the Second Battle of Bull Run. The men returned to camp and were put in the defenses. On September 13, Tyler's Brigade, as part of the Third Division, V Corps, marched towards South Mountain in central Maryland. It arrived near Sharpsburg, Maryland, on the 18th, but had arrived too late to participate in the Battle of Antietam.

During the night of the 18th, the Confederate army withdrew into Virginia. Until September 30, the regiment remained near Sharpsburg and drilled. During this time, Colonel Quay was caught typhoid fever and O'Brien took command. In November, the regiment moved to Fredericksburg, Virginia, where it went into camp.

In early December, Quay was forced to resign due to his disease and O'Brien was promoted to colonel, Thompson to lieutenant colonel, and Captain William H. Shaw to major. The 134th fought in the Battle of Fredericksburg on December 13, losing 14 killed, 106 wounded, and 19 missing. Despite his illness, Quay volunteered to serve as an aide to General Tyler throughout the battle, for which he would receive a Medal of Honor in 1888.

The regiment fought in the Battle of Chancellorsville from May 1 to 3 1863, on the left flank of the Union army. Total casualties were 48 men killed, wounded, and missing. The enlistments of the men expired soon after the battle, and the 134th was mustered out in Harrisburg on May 26, 1863.

== Service ==
- Organized at Camp Curtin.
- Sent to Washington, D.C. August 20.
- Duty at Sharpsburg, Md., till October 30.
- Reconnaissance to Smithfield, W. Va., October 16–17.
- Movement to Falmouth, Va., October 30-November 19.
- Battle of Fredericksburg, Va., December 12–15.
- Burnside's 2nd Campaign January 20–24, 1863.
- Duty at Falmouth, Va., till April 27.
- Chancellorsville Campaign April 27-May 6.
- Battle of Chancellorsville May 1–5.
- Mustered out May 26, 1863.

== Casualties ==
- Killed and mortally wounded: 4 officers, 38 enlisted men
- Wounded: ? officers, ? enlisted men
- Died of disease: 1 officer, 66 enlisted men
- Captured or missing: ? officers, ? enlisted men
- Total: ? officers, ? enlisted men
