= Keying =

Keying may refer to:

- Keying (electrical connector), used by electrical connectors to prevent mating in incorrect orientation
- Keying (graphics), a technique for compositing two full frame images together
- Keying (official) (1787–1858), a Manchu statesman during the Qing dynasty
  - Keying (ship), a Chinese junk which sailed to the U.S. and Britain in 1847–1848, named after the official
- Keying (telecommunications), a form of modulation where the modulating signal takes one of two or more values at all times
- Keying, vandalism of a painted surface by scratching it with a key
- Keying, in the sociology of Erving Goffman, is an action or utterance that signals the meaning of interaction to participants. Introduced in Frame Analysis: An Essay on the Organization of Experience (1974).

== See also ==
- Key (disambiguation)
