= Ben Keays =

Australian rules footballer

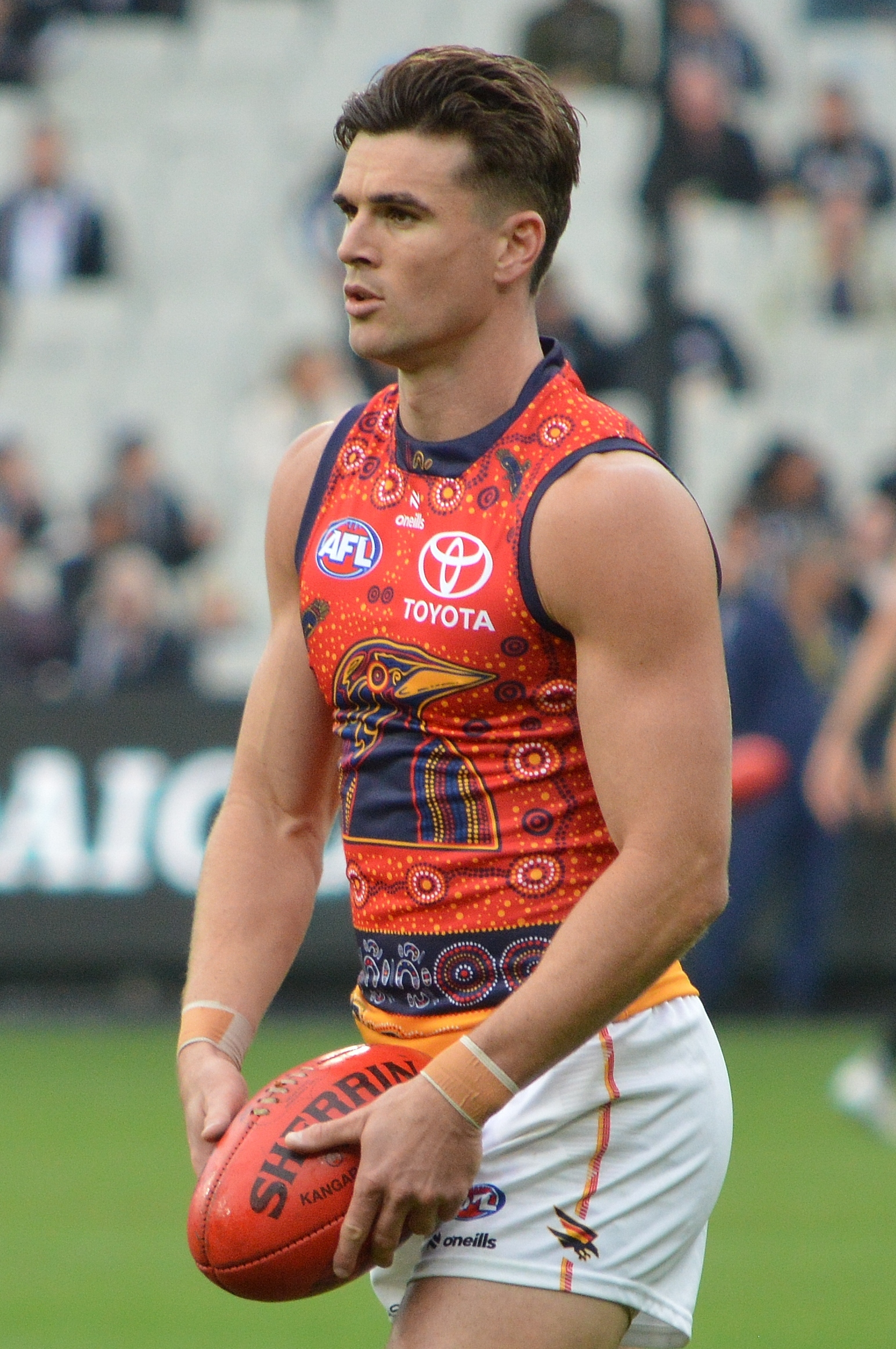
- Keays with Adelaide in May 2025

Personal information
- Full name: Ben Keays
- Nicknames: Keaysy, Keaysa, Keasus Christ
- Born: 23 February 1997 (age 29); Melbourne, Victoria
- Original teams: Morningside (QAFL); Redland (NEAFL); Brisbane Lions Academy
- Draft: No. 24, 2015 national draft (Academy selection)
- Height: 185 cm (6 ft 1 in)
- Weight: 89 kg (196 lb)
- Position: Forward / midfielder

Club information
- Current club: Adelaide
- Number: 2

Playing career^{1}
Years	Club	Games (Goals)
2016–2019	Brisbane Lions	30 (11)
2020–	Adelaide	152 (144)
Total		181 (155)
- ^{1} Playing statistics correct to the end of round 22, 2026.

Career highlights
- Malcolm Blight Medal: 2024; 2× NEAFL premiership player: 2017, 2019; Andrew Ireland Medal: 2017; Hunter Harrison Medal: 2015

Ben Keays (born 23 February 1997) is a professional Australian rules footballer playing for the Adelaide Football Club in the Australian Football League (AFL). His great-grandfather Fred Keays represented both Fitzroy and Collingwood in the Victorian Football League (VFL).

== Early life ==
Born in Melbourne, Keays participated in the Auskick program at Hampton, Victoria. Keays moved to Brisbane at five years of age and continued playing Auskick at the Morningside Australian Football Club. He attended St Joseph's College, Gregory Terrace throughout his schooling years. His great grandfather, Fred, played football for Fitzroy and Collingwood between 1919 and 1922 and served in both World War I and II. His great uncle, Desmond, also played football for Fitzroy while his uncle, Terry, played for Collingwood and Richmond. Ben began playing junior football for the Morningside Panthers and was placed in the Brisbane Lions Academy at the age of 14. He was selected to represent Queensland in the 2014 and 2015 AFL Under 18 Championships, and was selected in the 2014 and 2015 All-Australian teams. He also captained Queensland to their first division 2 title in nine years at the 2015 AFL Under 18 Championships and won the 2015 Hunter Harrison Medal for his performances across the three games.

Keays was recruited by the Brisbane Lions with their third selection and 24th overall in the 2015 national draft. He was the second academy selection for Brisbane after they matched a bid by the Western Bulldogs.

== AFL career ==
=== Brisbane Lions ===
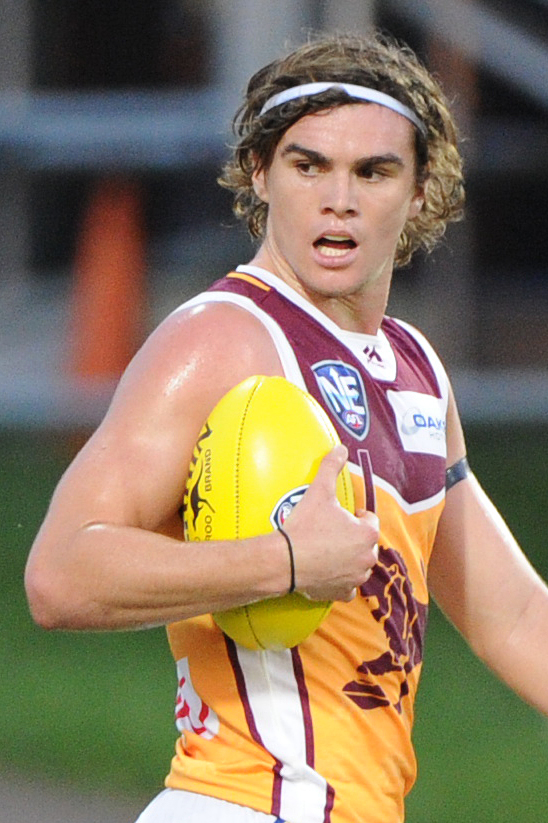
Keays with the Brisbane Lions in the NEAFL in 2018.

Keays made his AFL debut for Brisbane in Round 6, 2016, against the Sydney Swans. He won the Andrew Ireland Medal as best afield in the 2017 NEAFL Grand Final, amassing 30 disposals, 9 tackles and 2 goals. Keays won his second NEAFL premiership in 2019, kicking four goals in the win over Southport. He was delisted at the conclusion of the 2019 AFL season. Keays was later picked up by the Adelaide Crows at pick 7 in the 2019 rookie draft.

=== Adelaide Crows ===
Keays enjoyed a breakout 2020 AFL season, playing 16 games for the Crows. He finished 5th in the Malcolm Blight Medal and won the Players' Trademark award. He received competition-wide recognition with an impressive 2021 AFL season which was rewarded with a 2nd-place finish in the Malcolm Blight Medal. Keays shocked the AFL with an elite disposal average of 28.1 throughout the home-and-away season as well as polling 11 votes in the 2021 Brownlow Medal. In October 2021, he signed a contract which would keep him at the Crows until the end of 2024. Following the 2022 season, Keays was awarded with the Dr Brian Sando, OAM Award, given to the Adelaide Crow most professional and prepared throughout the season.

In an August 2023 match against Sydney, Keays had a shot for goal late in the game that was controversially adjudged to hit the post, but video evidence, which was only reviewed after the decision was made, deemed this incorrect. The goal would have given the Crows the lead with just a minute left, but the Swans were able to run down the clock and win by a point. This result eliminated Adelaide from finals calculations with one round of the regular season remaining. Keays' kick has become a benchmark for what the AFL is attempting to avoid, with an increasing number of scores being reviewed throughout every game.

Keays became one of three vice-captains of the Adelaide Crows prior to the 2024 season, joining Brodie Smith and Reilly O'Brien. Just months later, he extended his contract with the club until the end of 2027. In July 2024, Keays broke Adelaide's club record for the most consecutive games played with 100 games, overtaking the record 99 games previously held by Scott Thompson. Keays has not missed a game since his club debut in 2020. Just two weeks after a career-best four goals against his former side Brisbane, Keays bested himself by kicking five goals from 22 disposals in what was a clear best-on-ground performance in a two-point victory against Essendon. His efforts throughout the 2024 season were rewarded with him winning the Malcolm Blight Medal, the award for the player deemed best and fairest of the Adelaide Football Club. He shared the award with club captain Jordan Dawson, with both players polling 107 votes. Keays also won the Members' MVP Award and the Dr Brian Sando, OAM Trophy.

In the first game of 2026, Keays kicked the match-sealing goal at the MCG against Collingwood. He was the center of a controversy the following week when he deliberately instructed a fan to delay the play during a close match against the Western Bulldogs. Keays was back at his best in round five against Carlton when he kicked three goals in the second quarter.

As of 2026, Keays has not missed a game since his club debut in 2020.

== Honours and achievements ==
Team

- AFL minor premiership (Adelaide): 2025
- 2× NEAFL premiership player (Brisbane): 2017, 2019

Individual

- Malcolm Blight Medal: 2024
- Player's Trademark Award (Adelaide): 2020
- Member's MVP Award (Adelaide): 2024
- 3× Dr. Brian Sando, OAM Trophy (Adelaide): 2022, 2024, 2025
- Andrew Ireland Medal (NEAFL): 2017
- Hunter Harrison Medal (U18): 2015
- 2× U18 All-Australian team: 2014, 2015

== Statistics ==
Updated to the end of round 22, 2026.

Legend
G	Goals	K	Kicks	D	Disposals	T	Tackles
B	Behinds	H	Handballs	M	Marks

Season	Team	No.	Games	Totals							Averages (per game)							Votes
Season	Team	No.	Games	G	B	K	H	D	M	T	G	B	K	H	D	M	T	Votes
2016	Brisbane Lions	1	16	4	8	60	122	182	22	63	0.3	0.5	3.8	7.6	11.4	1.4	3.9	0
2017	Brisbane Lions	1	10	6	3	70	81	151	30	41	0.6	0.3	7.0	8.1	15.1	3.0	4.1	0
2018	Brisbane Lions	1	2	1	1	11	18	29	5	8	0.5	0.5	5.5	9.0	14.5	2.5	4.0	0
2019	Brisbane Lions	1	2	0	2	15	12	27	7	6	0.0	1.0	7.5	6.0	13.5	3.5	3.0	0
2020 (Note: The 2020 season was played with 17 home-and-away matches per team (down from 22) and 16-minute quarters with time on (down from 20-minute quarters with time on) due to the impact of the COVID-19 pandemic.)	Adelaide	28	16	3	5	147	118	265	47	53	0.2	0.3	9.2	7.4	16.6	2.9	3.3	1
2021	Adelaide	2	22	12	8	350	269	619	82	133	0.5	0.4	15.9	12.2	28.1	3.7	6.0	11
2022	Adelaide	2	22	10	12	315	271	586	73	106	0.5	0.5	14.3	12.3	26.6	3.3	4.8	11
2023	Adelaide	2	23	22	19	218	223	441	72	87	1.0	0.8	9.5	9.7	19.2	3.1	3.8	2
2024	Adelaide	2	23	34	20	225	148	373	88	83	1.5	0.9	9.8	6.4	16.2	3.8	3.6	4
2025	Adelaide	2	25	36	23	250	169	419	95	84	1.4	0.9	10.0	6.8	16.8	3.8	3.4	9
2026	Adelaide	2	21	27	9	171	133	304	59	64	1.3	0.4	8.1	6.3	14.5	2.8	3.0	0
Career			182	155	110	1832	1564	3396	580	728	0.9	0.6	10.1	8.6	18.7	3.2	4.0	38
