= Early Side of Later =

Studio album by Matt Goss
- Released: 21 June 2004
- Recorded: 2004
- Studios: Eldon St., Glasgow; Rollover, London; Roundhouse, London; Sarm West, London
- Genres: Soul; pop
- Length: 49:24
- Label: Concept Music
- Producer: Michael Daley

Matt Goss chronology
One (1997)	Early Side of Later (2004)	Gossy (2009)

Singles from Early Side of Later
- 1. "Fly" Released: 19 July 2004

Early Side of Later is the third studio album by English singer-songwriter Matt Goss, released on 21 June 2004 by Concept Music. It includes the single "Fly", which was released in July 2004, peaking at No. 31 on the UK Singles Chart. The non-album single, "I'm Coming with Ya", released in November 2003 and reaching No. 22 on the singles chart, is included on the album as an enhanced video.

The album was released after Goss appeared on the ITV reality show Hells Kitchen. It reached No. 87 on the UK Albums Chart for 1 week.

== Track listing ==
1. Fly – 4:04
2. Watch me Fall – 4:04
3. Carolyn – 5:10
4. Face the Wind – 4:40
5. Many Roads – 4:32
6. Just for a Change – 3:08
7. We Can't Lose – 4:32
8. Perfect Girl – 3:07
9. Best of Me – 4:54
10. Fever – 4:38
11. Goodbye – 5:35
12. I'm Coming with Ya (video) – 5:38

== Personnel ==
- Matt Goss – vocals, keyboards, guitar
- Richard Steel – guitar
- Stanley Andrew – guitar
- Alison Pearce – keyboards
- Kevin Sutherland – keyboards
- Michael Daley – drums, bass, keyboards, producer
- Dick Beetham – mastering
- Wayne Lawes – mixing
