= Matt Goss =

English singer-songwriter (born 1968)

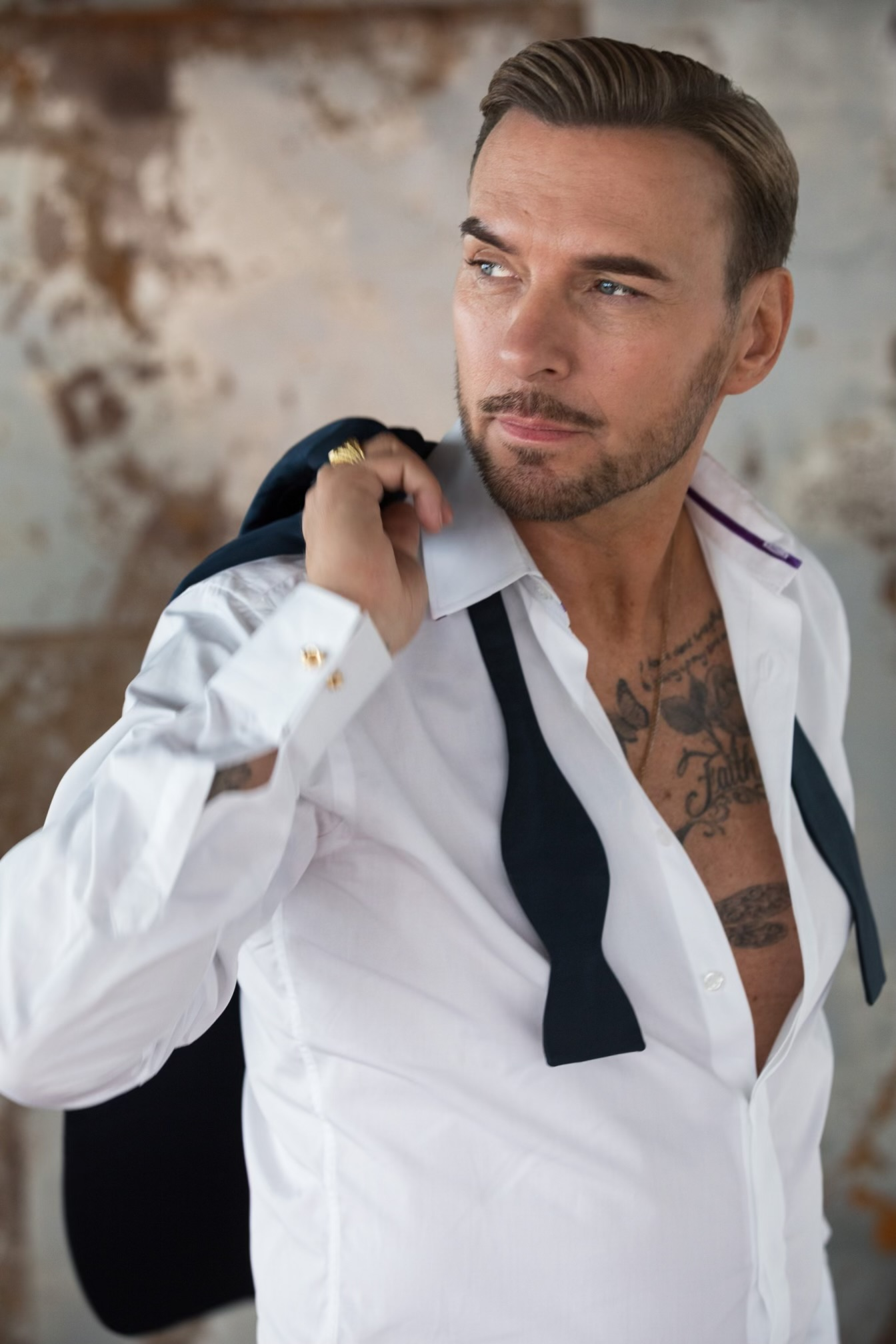
- Goss in 2024

Background information
- Born: Matthew Weston Goss; 29 September 1968 (age 58); Lewisham, London, England
- Occupations: Singer, songwriter
- Instruments: Vocals, guitar, piano, bass, keyboards, programming
- Years active: 1986–present
- Labels: Decca, Virgin
- Website: mattgossofficial.co.uk

Matthew Weston Goss (born 29 September 1968) is an English singer-songwriter and musician. He was the lead singer of 1980s pop group Bros, which also featured his twin brother Luke as the drummer.

== Early life ==
Goss was born on 29 September 1968 at Lewisham Hospital, in the London borough of Lewisham. He is the twin and younger brother of Luke Goss.

== Career ==
=== The Bros band ===
The Goss twins and their friend Craig Logan were schoolboys when they became successful with Bros in 1986. They sold 16 million records worldwide and hit the number one spot with tracks including "I Owe You Nothing" and "When Will I Be Famous?". Matt went on to become the youngest artist to headline Wembley Stadium, performing to 77,000 fans.

Their debut album, Push, went 4× Platinum in the UK and peaked at number two. It remained in the UK charts for 84 weeks.

In 1989, Bros won the Brit Award for "Breakthrough Artist", receiving the award from Ronnie Wood and Bill Wyman of The Rolling Stones.

After announcing a one-off Bros reunion show in the London O2 Arena in 2017, tickets sold out in seven seconds.

=== Solo music career ===
After the Bros band broke up, Goss continued a solo career, releasing five solo studio albums. His latest, The Beautiful Unknown, reached number seven in the UK album charts selling 6000 copies worldwide.

Goss wrote the theme song Lovely Las Vegas for the TV station Fox 5, which was used for more than 10 years. He also wrote the theme song It’s The End of the Road for the American TV show So You Think You Can Dance.

Goss contributed to the soundtrack of the 1999 movie Stuart Little, writing the song Lucky Day. He published a memoir in 2005, More Than You Know.

After Bros split, Goss moved to America. By 2010, he was performing in Las Vegas, at Caesars Palace in January 2010. In 2015, he was performing four nights a week there, staying for a total 11 years. The show was brought to the Royal Albert Hall.

During his time performing in Las Vegas, Goss received recognition including ceremonial honours from the city, and was awarded a United Nations humanitarian award for charity work supporting troops and veterans.

2018 saw the release of the documentary Bros: After The Screaming Stops, which was about Matt and his brother's life. It premiered at the BFI London Film Festival. It won "Best Documentary" at the National Film Awards and a BAFTA. The film also won "Moment of the Year" at the 2019 BBC Radio & Music Awards. Following a national theatre release, the movie went on to become the most downloaded BBC production in 2018 and was viewed more than 20 million times.

In 2021, he was awarded the Royal Society of St George honorary membership medal.

In 2022, he contended on Strictly Come Dancing. In 2023, Goss embarked on a UK tour, The Matt Goss Experience, which began at the Royal Albert Hall with the Royal Philharmonic Orchestra and his 15-piece MG Big Band. He performed his songs, new original music and his own tribute to Cole Porter. The Times' reviewer gave it 3 stars out of 5, calling him the David Brent of pop.

== Philanthropy ==
In early 2020, Goss recorded his version of If I Aint Got You, which was produced by Babyface. The song was released as a fundraiser for the National Health Service (NHS) during the COVID-19 pandemic. His efforts resulted in supplying thousands of meals for first responders.

== Personal life ==
As of 2024, he is in a relationship with Chantal Brown, a jewelry designer. He said of his brother the same year that "We are completely estranged."

== Discography ==
=== Studio albums ===
Title	Details	Chart positions	Certifications
Title	Details	UK	Certifications
The Key	Released: 6 May 1996; Label: Polydor	—	
Early Side of Later	Released: June 2004; Label: Concept Music	87	
Gossy	Released: August 2009; Label: TMG	—	
Life You Imagine	Released: October 2013; Label: Universal Records	27	
The Beautiful Unknown	Released: 25 March 2022; Label: Lewisham Records	7	

=== Singles ===
Year	Title	Chart positions		Album
Year	Title	UK	BEL	Album
1995	"The Key"	40	35	The Key
1996	"Heaven Is 10 Zillion Light Years Away"	—	—	The Key
1996	"If You Were Here Tonight"	23	—	The Key
2003	"I'm Coming with Ya"	22	—	Early Side of Later
2004	"Fly"	31	—	Early Side of Later
2006	"It's the End of the Road"	—	—	Non-album single
2006	"Evil"	—	—	Gossy
2010	"Firefly" (with Paul Oakenfold)	—	—	Gossy
2011	"Fighting for Love"	—	—	Non-album single
2013	"Strong"	—	—	Life You Imagine
2014	"I Do"	—	—	Life You Imagine
2014	"Nothing Like This"	—	—	Life You Imagine
2016	"A Vegas Summer"	—	—	Non-album single
2016	"Gone Too Long"	—	—	Non-album single
2018	"Red Flares"	—	—	Non-album single
2020	"If I Ain't Got You"	—	—	
2021	"Somewhere to Fall"	—	—	The Beautiful Unknown
2021	"Better with You"	—	—	The Beautiful Unknown
2021	"Saved"	—	—	The Beautiful Unknown
2025	"We are Not Broken"	—	—	
2025	"Come Home"	—	—	Non-album single

=== As featured artist ===
Year	Title	Chart positions	Album
Year	Title	UK	Album
1995	"Supermodel Sandwich W/Cheese" (Terence Trent D'arby feat. Matt Goss)	—	Vibrator
2004	"I Need the Key" (Minimal Chic feat. Matt Goss)	54	Non-album Single
2005	"With Or Without You" (Minimal Chic feat. Matt Goss)	—	Non-album Single
2013	"Touch the Sky" (Paul Oakenfold, Matt Goss & The Concrete Sneakers)	—	Non-album Single
