= Gossy =

Studio album by Matt Goss
- Released: 24 August 2009
- Recorded: 2009
- Genre: soul; pop
- Label: TMG Records
- Producer: Matt Goss

Matt Goss chronology
Early Side of Later (2004)	Gossy (2009)	Life You Imagine (2013)

Singles from Gossy
- 1. "Evil" Released: 3 August 2009; 2. "Firefly" Released: 4 October 2010

Gossy is the fourth studio album by English singer-songwriter Matt Goss. It was released in 2009 by TMG Records and featured the hit single Firefly which was remixed by Paul Oakenfold and went straight to #1 in the world trance charts. The album was produced, mixed, written and financed completely by Matt Goss and features the tracks Evil which tied in with his Vegas residency and Change Me which was later recorded by Akon and Keri Hilson. The original US release featured 14 tracks while the later UK version included 4 new tracks & 1 Remix minus Evil (Dave Aude Club Mix) from the original.

== Track listing (Original US release) ==
1. The Day We Met - 5:10
2. Along For The Ride - 4:01
3. Evil - 3:27
4. Don't Wanna Be Your Angel - 5:15
5. Take Me Home - 5:35
6. Change Me - 5:01
7. Into The Sunset - 4:52
8. If We're Lost - 3:55
9. Our Time - 3:11
10. Firefly - 4:07
11. Pins And Needles - 5:52
12. Mr. Read - 4:07
13. A Song For You - 3:52
14. Evil (Dave Aude Club Mix) - 6:20

== Track listing (2010 UK release) ==
1. The Day We Met - 5:10
2. Along For The Ride - 4:01
3. Evil - 3:27
4. Don't Wanna Be Your Angel - 5:15
5. Take Me Home - 5:35
6. Change Me - 5:01
7. Into The Sunset - 4:52
8. If We're Lost - 3:55
9. Our Time - 3:11
10. Firefly - 4:07
11. Pins And Needles - 5:55
12. Mr. Read - 4:07
13. A Song For You - 3:52
14. Just Keep It Simple - 4:09
15. To Be Free - 3:44
16. We're All Kings - 4:03
17. Gravity - 4:05
18. Firefly (Loverush UK! Radio Edit) - 3:09
