= New Quay (disambiguation) =

New Quay is a seaside town in Ceredigion, Wales.

New Quay and similar may refer to:

- Newquay, town in Cornwall, England
- New Quay (Devon), small abandoned port in Devon, England
- New Quay, County Clare, seaside town in Ireland
- New Quay, residential precinct in Melbourne Docklands, Australia
