= Keay =

Keay is an English surname, pronounced [keɪ] (KAY); It is a variant of the surname Kay.

Notable people with the surname include:

- Anna Keay (born 1974), British historian
- Jack Keay (born 1960), Scottish footballer
- John Keay (born 1941), British historian, journalist and writer
- John Seymour Keay (1839-1909), Scottish businessman and a Member of UK Parliament
- Nigel Keay (born 1955), New Zealand musician
- Ronald William John Keay (1920–1998), British botanist
- Watty Keay (1871–1943), Scottish footballer

== See also ==
- 5007 Keay, main-belt asteroid
- Keays, a surname
