= Fred Keays =

Australian rules footballer

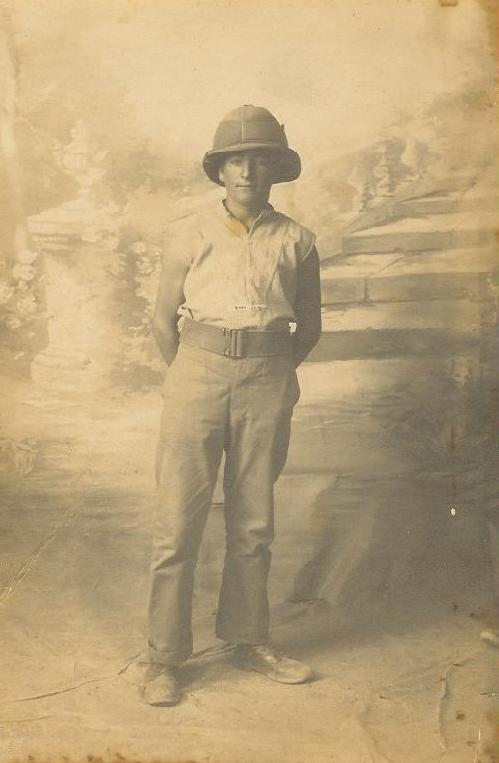
- Fred Keays in Egypt prior to Gallipoli, France combat

Personal information
- Full name: Frederick William Keays
- Born: 12 July 1898; Richmond, Victoria
- Died: 24 June 1983 (aged 84); Newcomb, Victoria
- Original team: Army / Fitzroy District
- Height: 178 cm (5 ft 10 in)
- Weight: 72 kg (159 lb)

Playing career^{1}
| Years | Club | Games (Goals) |
| 1919–20 | Fitzroy | 5 (1) |
| 1922 | Collingwood | 3 (0) |
| Total | | 8 (1) |
- ^{1} Playing statistics correct to the end of 1922.

Frederick William Keays (12 July 1898 – 24 June 1983) was an Australian rules footballer who played with Fitzroy (1919–1921) and Collingwood (in the 1922 VFL season) in the Victorian Football League (VFL). After his playing career, Fred competed in the 1927 Stawell Gift won by his rival at that time, Tom Miles. He was a trainer and committee member for Fitzroy spanning two decades until the Second World War. He served for a second time in WW2 having previously served and twice been wounded as a 16-year-old ANZAC in WW1.

Keays eldest son, Desmond Charles Keays enlisted in 1941, was reported as missing in July 1942 and died in 1945 as a POW at Sandakan camp. Desmond is also remembered for paying the ultimate price for his country on the Fitzroy Football Club website – Fitzroy Football Club Anzac Day Tribute.

Fred Keays' grandson Terry Keays also played Australian rules football with Collingwood. His great-grandson Ben Keays is a current Australian rules footballer with Adelaide.

== ANZAC ==
Keays was only in his 17th year as he completed training in Egypt before being initially deployed with the 8th Battalion (Australia) (November 1915) as reinforcements at Gallipoli before the retreat in December 1915. He was then wounded, most likely in France at the Battle of Pozières. After being wounded for a second time, most likely on the Western Front this time in his lower right leg, he was sent to England to recover before returning home to Fitzroy, Melbourne 1919. In WW2 his age was recorded as one year younger (1900 birth year recorded when it was 1899) thus reporting an age of 39 at enlistment.
