= The Keys, Newfoundland and Labrador =

Coordinates: 47°18′15″N 52°48′46″W

The Keys is a settlement located south of Bay Bulls, Newfoundland and Labrador. The Keys is now a part of the town of Bay Bulls, as are the communities of Irishtown, Bread and Cheese, and Gunridge.

== See also ==
- List of communities in Newfoundland and Labrador
