= KWAI (AM) =

Radio station in Honolulu, Hawaii

Honolulu, Hawaii; United States
- Frequency: 1080 kHz
- Branding: "K-108"

Programming
- Format: Defunct (was Brokered Talk Radio)
- Affiliations: USA Radio Network

Ownership
- Owner: Radio Hawaii, Incorporated

History
- First air date: January 21, 1972
- Last air date: June 20, 2023
- Former call signs: KHAI (1972–1973); KIOE (1973–1983); KZHI (1983–1984)
- Call sign meaning: Hawaii

Technical information
- Class: B
- Power: 5,000 watts
- Transmitter coordinates: 21°17′41″N 157°51′49″W

Links
- Website: kwai1080am.weebly.com

KWAI (1080 kHz) was a commercial AM radio station in Honolulu, Hawaii, owned by Radio Hawaii, Incorporated. The station offered a talk radio format, featuring local shows, including paid brokered programming.

KWAI broadcast with power of 5,000 watts with its transmitter off Kalani Street in Honolulu. KWAI billed itself on air as "The Mighty 1080." It aired national news from the USA Radio Network at the beginning of most hours.

The station first signed on the air on January 21, 1972. as KHAI. Radio Hawaii surrendered KWAI's license to the Federal Communications Commission on June 20, 2023; the FCC cancelled the license the next day.
