= Key Cay =

Island in the British Virgin Islands

Coordinates: 18°20′41″N 64°35′45″W

Key Cay is a small islet off the coast of Peter Island in the British Virgin Islands. On the north and west sides of the islet there are rocky beaches and the south and east sides are cliffs.
