= The Key (Matt Goss song) =

Single by Matt Goss

from the album The Key
- B-side: "Second Time Dreaming"
- Released: 1995
- Genre: funk, soul, pop
- Length: 3:59
- Label: Polydor
- Songwriter: Matt Goss
- Producers: Matt Goss, Tony Phillips

Matt Goss singles chronology
"The Key" (1995)	"If You Were Here Tonight" (1996)

"The Key" is the debut solo single from English singer-songwriter and musician Matt Goss. It was released in 1995 as the lead single from his debut solo album, The Key (1996). It peaked at number 40 on the UK Singles Chart and 35 in Belgium. The track was re-recorded and re-released in 2004 as "Minimal Chic Ft. Matt Goss" and peaked at number 54 on the UK Singles Chart.

Goss composed the music, lyrics, production, programming, keyboards, bass, vocals and backing vocals on the track with Tony Phillips on the production and mixing. The track was released in the UK, Italy, France, Netherlands and Australia. "Second Time Dreaming" was an exclusive B-side to the cassette single only in the UK.

The track was remixed by Italian DJ Joe T Vannelli and the remix peaked at number one in the Italian dance chart.

== Track listings ==
- CD
1. "The Key" (7" Edit) — 3:59
2. "The Key" (Joe T Vannelli Dubby Mix) — 7:07
3. "The Key" (Joe T Vannelli Corvette Mix) — 7:00
4. "The Key" (Joe T Vannelli Corvette 2 Mix) — 7:35
- 12"
1. "The Key" (Joe T. Vannelli Dubby Mix) — 9:09
2. "The Key" (Joe T. Vannelli Corvette 2 Mix) — 7:35
- Cassette single
1. "The Key" (7" Edit) — 3:59
2. "Second Time Dreaming" — 5:25

== Personnel ==
- Guitar – Tim Pierce
- Keyboards – Max Cassan (CD tracks: 2, 3, 4)
- Music By, Lyrics By, Producer, Programmed By, Keyboards, Bass, Vocals, Backing Vocals – Matt Goss
- Producer, Recorded By, Mixed By, Programmed By – Tony Phillips
- Remix, Bass, Drums – Joe T. Vannelli (CD tracks: 2, 3, 4)

== Charts ==
Chart (1995)	Peak position
Belgium (Ultratop 50 Wallonia)	35
Europe (European Dance Radio)	19
UK Singles (OCC)	40

Chart (2004)	Peak position
UK Singles (OCC)	54
