= Life You Imagine =

Studio album by Matt Goss
- Released: 14 October 2013
- Recorded: 2013
- Genre: Swing
- Label: Universal Records
- Producer: Ron Fair

Matt Goss chronology
Gossy (2009)	Life You Imagine (2013)

Singles from Life You Imagine
- 1. "Strong" Released: 30 September 2013; 2. "I Do" Released: 11 February 2014; 3. "Nothing Like This" Released: 29 September 2014

Life You Imagine is the fourth studio album by English singer-songwriter Matt Goss. It was released in 2013 by Decca Records and reached No. 27 on the UK album charts where it stayed for 2 weeks selling an estimated 7000 copies worldwide. The albums was his highest charted album since the Bros days. The album features a big band version of the classic Bros hit, "When Will I Be Famous" and was produced by Ron Fair. The album also features the track "Strong", which was used as part of the Susan G. Komen breast cancer awareness campaign.

== Track listing ==
1. Mustang – 3:43
2. Lovely Las Vegas – 4:46
3. When Will I Be Famous – 4:08
4. Strong – 4:00
5. I Do – 4:30
6. Face my Fears – 4:05
7. Evil – 4:30
8. The Day We Met – 5:17
9. There's Nothing Like This - 4:26
10. All About The Hang - 3:52

== Charts ==
Weekly chart performance for Life You Imagine
Chart (2013)	Peak position
Scottish Albums (OCC)	48
UK Albums (OCC)	27
