= Matthew Quay =

American politician (1833–1904)

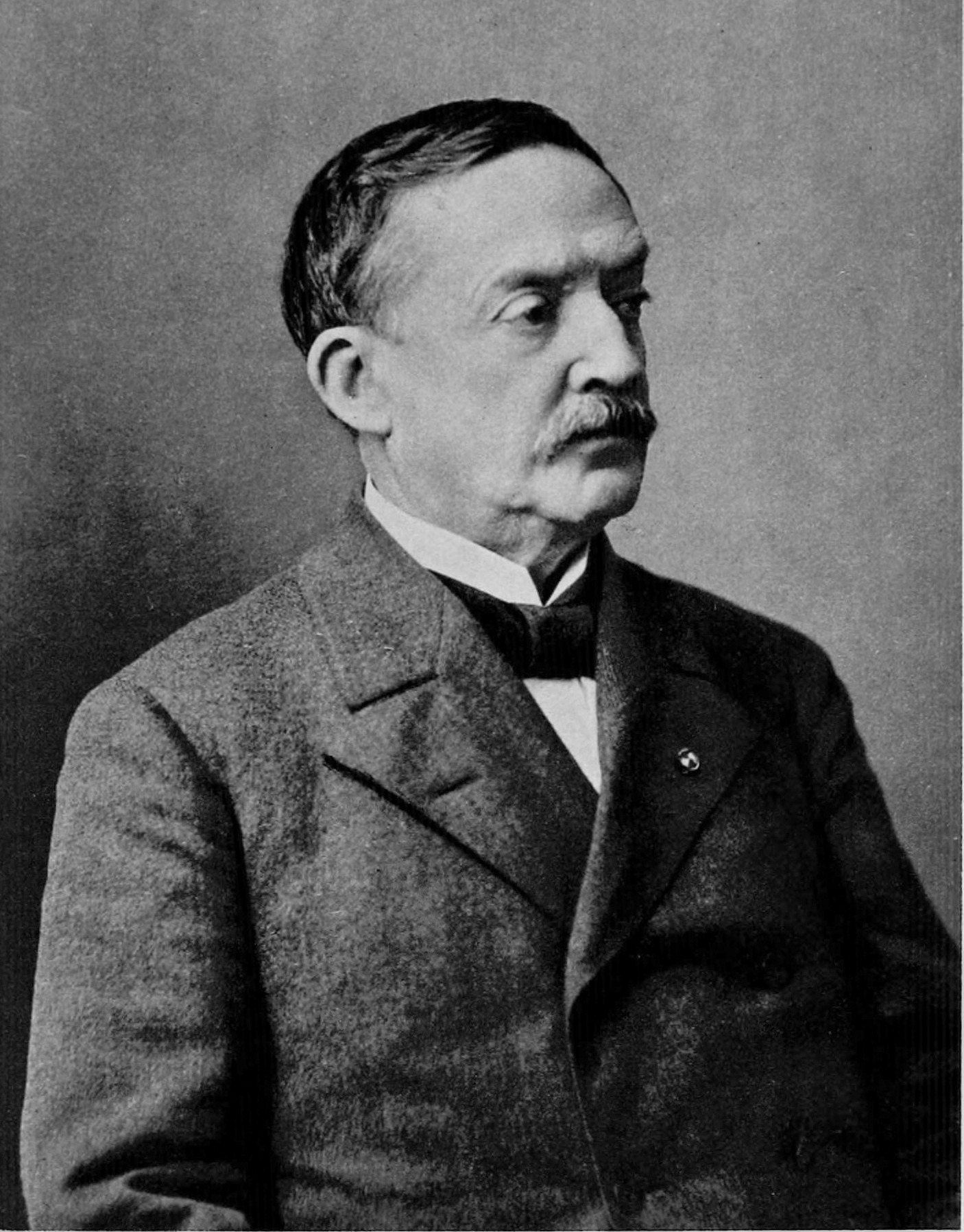

United States Senator from Pennsylvania
- In office January 16, 1901 – May 28, 1904
- Preceded by: Vacant
- Succeeded by: Philander C. Knox
- In office March 4, 1887 – March 3, 1899
- Preceded by: John I. Mitchell
- Succeeded by: Vacant

Chair of the Republican National Committee
- In office July 1888 – July 1891
- Preceded by: Benjamin Jones
- Succeeded by: James Clarkson
State offices
Secretary of the Commonwealth of Pennsylvania
In office January 30, 1879 – November 3, 1882
| Governor | Henry M. Hoyt |
| Preceded by | John Blair Linn |
| Succeeded by | Francis Jordan |
In office January 22, 1873 – May 2, 1878
| Governor | John F. Hartranft |
| Preceded by | Francis Jordan |
| Succeeded by | John Blair Linn |
39th Treasurer of Pennsylvania
In office 1886–1887
| Governor | Robert E. Pattison; James A. Beaver |
| Preceded by | William Livsey |
| Succeeded by | William Livsey |
Member of the Pennsylvania House of Representatives Beaver and Washington counties
In office 1865–1868
| Preceded by | Isaiah White (as member for Beaver and Lawrence counties) |
| Succeeded by | Thomas Nicholson |
Recorder of Philadelphia
In office 1878–1879
| Preceded by | Office created |
| Succeeded by | David H. Lane |
Prothonotary of Beaver County
In office 1856–1861
| Preceded by | A. R. Thomson |
| Succeeded by | Michael Weyand |

Personal details
- Born: Matthew Stanley Quay; September 30, 1833 Dillsburg, Pennsylvania, U.S.
- Died: May 28, 1904 (aged 70) Beaver, Pennsylvania, U.S.
- Party: Republican
- Spouse: Agnes Barclay (m. 1855)
- Children: 5
- Education: Washington and Jefferson College (BA)

Military service
- Branch/service: United States Army
- Years of service: 1861–1862
- Rank: Colonel
- Unit: 134th Pennsylvania Infantry
- Battles/wars: American Civil War; Battle of Fredericksburg
- Awards: Medal of Honor

Matthew Stanley Quay (/kweɪ/; September 30, 1833 – May 28, 1904) was an American politician of the Republican Party who represented Pennsylvania in the United States Senate from 1887 until 1899 and from 1901 until his death in 1904. Quay's control of the Pennsylvania Republican political machine for almost twenty years made him one of the most powerful and influential politicians in the country. As chair of the Republican National Committee and thus party campaign manager, he helped elect Benjamin Harrison as president in 1888. He was also instrumental in the 1900 election of Theodore Roosevelt as vice president.

Quay studied law and began his career in public office by becoming prothonotary of Beaver County, Pennsylvania, in 1856. He became personal secretary to Governor Andrew Curtin in 1861 after campaigning for him the previous year. During the Civil War, he served in the Union Army, commanding the 134th Pennsylvania Infantry Regiment as a colonel. Quay received the Medal of Honor for heroism at the Battle of Fredericksburg. He acted as Pennsylvania's military agent in Washington before returning to Harrisburg to assist Curtin and aid in his re-election in 1863. He was a member of the Pennsylvania House of Representatives from 1865 to 1868.

Beginning in 1867, Quay became increasingly aligned with the political machine run by Senator Simon Cameron, and, by 1880, was the chief lieutenant of Cameron and his son and successor Don. Quay served as Secretary of the Commonwealth, Philadelphia County Recorder, and Pennsylvania Treasurer. He was elected state treasurer in 1885, eclipsing Don Cameron as Pennsylvania's Republican political boss and putting Quay in position to run for the U.S. Senate. He served there from 1887 to 1899, and then from 1901 until his death in 1904. He advocated for Pennsylvania's economic interests, paying little mind to matters that did not affect his home state.

At the height of his career, Quay influenced appointments to thousands of state and federal positions in Pennsylvania, the occupants of which had to help finance the machine. Opponents within the Pennsylvania Republican Party, such as merchant John Wanamaker, contested his leadership from time to time, usually unsuccessfully, though they did block his election to a third term in the Senate for two years, causing the 1899 legislative election for senator to end with no one chosen. Increasingly in poor health, he took on few new battles in his final years. After Quay's death, his political machine was taken over by his fellow Pennsylvania senator, Boies Penrose, who continued to run it until his own death in 1921.

== Early life and career ==
Matthew Stanley Quay was born in Dillsburg, Pennsylvania, on September 30, 1833. His father was Anderson Beaton Quay, a Presbyterian minister; Matthew's mother's last name at her birth was Catherine McCain. The Quay family was of Scottish and Manx descent; Matthew Quay had a Native American great-grandmother. Matthew was named for General Matthew Stanley, who raised McCain after her parents died; he was one of eight children and the oldest son to reach adulthood.

The Quay family lived in several towns in central and western Pennsylvania during Matthew's childhood as Reverend Quay accepted new positions, before they finally settled in Beaver in 1850, where the family had previously lived in the early 1840s. Despite the itinerant nature of the family's existence, the education of the children, including the girls, was not neglected. Matthew attended Beaver and Indiana academies, then enrolled at Jefferson College (now Washington & Jefferson College), where he became a member of Beta Theta Pi.

After graduating in 1850, Quay visited Mississippi, where one of his classmates lived on a plantation. They had plans to go into business giving stereopticon lectures, but the equipment broke. Unable to find suitable employment in the South, he returned to Pennsylvania, where he read law in the Pittsburgh firm of Penney and Starrett. James C. Penney, a partner in the firm, stated that he "had never known a man of his age whose mind was so well disciplined and mature". In late 1852, uncertain that he was suited to the law, Quay embarked on another tour of the South but was again unable to find profitable employment and returned to complete his legal studies under the tutelage of Colonel Richard Roberts of Beaver. He was admitted to the bar in Beaver County on October 13, 1854.

In 1856, Governor James Pollock appointed Quay as prothonotary of Beaver County, to fill an unexpired term. The appointment came because the governor and his advisors respected Reverend Quay, and the young lawyer was elected to three-year terms in 1856 and 1859. At this time, the Republican Party was being formed; Quay became a member and was the Beaver County manager of that party's candidate for governor in 1860, Andrew Curtin. Quay's success in getting delegates to the state convention from western Pennsylvania to support Curtin was crucial to his getting the nomination. In October 1860, Curtin was elected, and won Beaver County by a large margin, causing him to admire Quay's political skill.

== American Civil War ==
When I met him [Quay], he did not at first impress me as a man of more than ordinary parts. He was extremely modest and unassuming in manner, with a defective sight in one eye that made his face expressionless, excepting when very warmly aroused in conversation. Under ordinary conditions he might have filled the place of secretary to the Governor without commanding the special attention of the political leaders of the State, but the most momentous events were crowded upon us at Harrisburg immediately after Curtin assumed his official duties, and Quay soon became recognized as one of the most valuable of all the men connected with the administration in meeting sudden and severe emergencies.

— Alexander Kelly McClure

When Curtin became governor in January 1861, he made Quay his private secretary—a considerable advancement for a rural lawyer. At the start of the Civil War, Quay was among the earliest from Beaver County to volunteer. During May 1861, he was commissioned as a first lieutenant in the 19th Division Pennsylvania Uniformed Militia, but did not take up that place. Instead, Governor Andrew Curtin made him assistant commissary general of Pennsylvania, with the rank of lieutenant colonel. After the functions of the state commissariat were transferred to Washington, Curtin continued Quay as his private secretary. Curtin sought to be a friend of and advocate for Pennsylvania's soldiers, and hundreds of letters poured in each day, letters that the governor had decreed must be individually answered, no matter how petty the grievance. This task was delegated to Quay, and he performed it flawlessly, even reproducing Curtin's signature so perfectly even the governor could not tell the difference.

Other tasks Quay performed for Curtin included being liaison to the legislature. The Republicans lost their majority in the Pennsylvania House of Representatives in the 1861 election, but Quay was able to forge an alliance between the Republican minority and the War Democrats, assuring a legislature that would work with Curtin on war matters. Curtin found Quay's services valuable, and was reluctant to lose him, but Quay wanted a combat assignment, which in August 1862 he got, as colonel of the 134th Pennsylvania Infantry. He and his troops joined General George McClellan's Army of the Potomac in late September 1862, as it pursued General Robert E. Lee's Confederate Army of Northern Virginia after the Battle of Antietam. He did not see combat at that time, as McClellan was content to let Lee retreat into Virginia without a battle. Shortly thereafter, Quay fell ill of typhoid fever, and on medical advice, and because Curtin wanted him to serve as Pennsylvania's military agent in Washington, he submitted his resignation on December 5, 1862, though there were delays in accepting it.

In late 1862, Union forces, Quay's among them, prepared for an attack on Fredericksburg, Virginia, on the road to Richmond, the Confederate capital. The acceptance of Quay's resignation was received on the eve of the Battle of Fredericksburg, and he refused to leave his men, persuading commanders to accept him as a voluntary aide-de-camp. Quay was warned by the chief surgeon not to join in the battle because of his health, and was told he would die like a fool. He replied, "I'd rather die like a fool than live like a coward." The attack was a disaster for Union forces, as the Confederate soldiers were well-emplaced, and could not be dislodged. Quay's troops were sent to attack the Confederate positions on Marye's Heights; hidden behind a stone wall, Confederate forces were able to unleash a torrent of fire against the attackers. Astride a horse, Quay urged his men forward, and they were able to get within 25 or 30 yards (23 to 28 meters) of the wall before retreating, with half the soldiers dead or wounded. Quay was not wounded, and his conduct earned him the Medal of Honor.

Quay then served as Pennsylvania's military agent in Washington. Although the federal government took a predominant role over the states in the Civil War, state governors appointed agents to liaise with federal officials, to see to the well-being of the state's soldiers, and to answer letters and complaints from troops. Unhappy in the role, in 1863, he secured a transfer back to Harrisburg as Curtin's military secretary, where he did similar work, and where he could help with the governor's successful re-election campaign that year.

== Entry into politics (1864–1872) ==
In 1864, Quay was elected to the state House of Representatives for Beaver and Washington counties, he was re-elected in 1865 and 1866. In 1866, he became the leader of the Republican majority in the House and the chairman of the Ways and Means Committee. Rarely participating in debate, he sought efficiency, causing the appropriations bills to be brought forward early in the session, rather than late, as was customary.

In 1867, the legislature was to elect a United States Senator, since senators before 1913 were chosen by legislators, not the people. Curtin sought the seat, as did former senator and U.S. Secretary of War Simon Cameron. As well as supporting Curtin, Quay wanted to be Speaker of the Pennsylvania House, but Curtin's senatorial rivals believed that granting Quay the powers of the speakership would lead to the election of Curtin. Thus, they combined to defeat him. Cameron gained the party legislative caucus's nomination for senator, and Quay healed relations by moving to make the nomination unanimous. Cameron was thereafter elected by the full legislature. Senator Cameron took full control of the state Republican Party over the next years, as Curtin lost power, especially when he was appointed Minister to Russia by President Ulysses S. Grant in 1869, leading to his extended absence from the state, and rising Republicans had to choose between alliance with Cameron or political oblivion. Quay chose the former. Nevertheless, not wanting to be seen as a traitor to Curtin, Quay's change of loyalty was so gradual it was not until 1872 that it was complete.

Quay did not seek re-election to the legislature in 1867, instead returning to his hometown and founding a weekly newspaper, the Beaver Radical, which began publication in January 1868. Quay, the editor, declared it to be Republican in outlook but not devoted to any faction. Circulation grew rapidly, and by 1872, the Radical claimed to be the most-distributed weekly in western Pennsylvania. The Radical opposed President Andrew Johnson, but decried the Tenure of Office Act, that Johnson was impeached for violating, as plainly unconstitutional. The Radical also urged Northern states to support African Americans by giving full force to the Fifteenth Amendment's promise of universal male suffrage. According to Frank Bernard Evans in his thesis on Pennsylvania politics of the 1870s, Quay made the Radical to be among "the best-known and most widely-quoted journals in the state".

== Cameron lieutenant (1872–1879) ==
Beginning shortly after the Civil War, Simon Cameron had begun to build a powerful Republican political machine in Pennsylvania. The statewide machine was effectively an alliance of municipal and county Republican machines whose interests had to be harmonized by its leader, the most important being the organizations of strongly Republican Philadelphia County and Allegheny County (Pittsburgh). The Pennsylvania Manufacturers Association was closely aligned with the machine, which followed a conservative course over several decades. Beyond personal leadership by the boss, success required efficient party organization, a political program that could unify the party, and a failure of the Democratic Party, deemed the party of treason after the Civil War, to regain the trust of the Pennsylvania electorate.

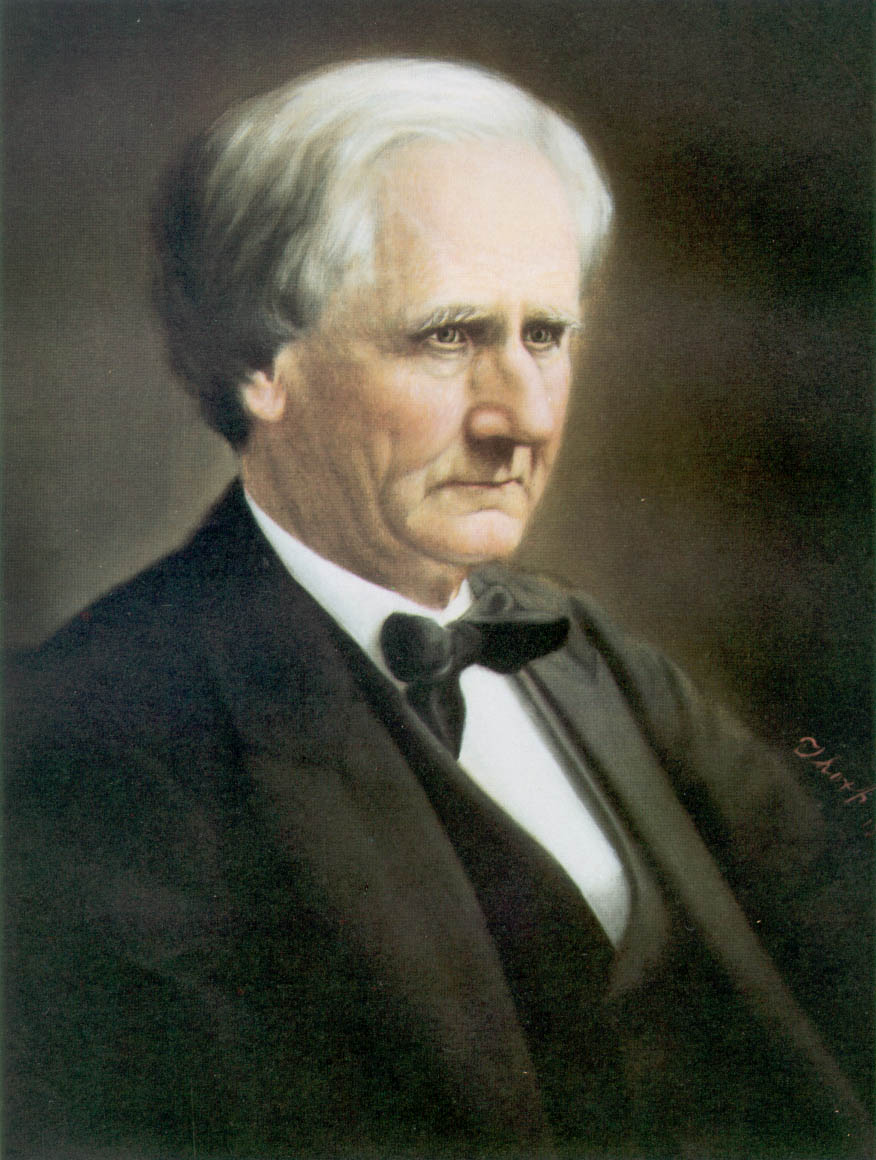
Senator Simon Cameron in 1874

After his return from Russia, former governor Curtin in 1872 destroyed his remaining influence in the Pennsylvania Republican Party by supporting the Liberal Republican Party, made up of those Republicans opposed to the policies of President Grant, or alienated by the corruption in his administration. Quay fully broke with Curtin, strongly supporting the regular Republican ticket. Quay backed Grant for re-election over the Liberal Republican/Democratic candidate, Horace Greeley of New York, as well as the Republican nominee for governor, Pennsylvania Auditor General (and former Union General) John F. Hartranft. Both Republican candidates were successful, and Quay was rewarded for his efforts for Hartranft with the post of Secretary of the Commonwealth. Returning to the center of Republican politics, he gave up the Radical, selling it to James S. Rutan, his lieutenant in the Cameron machine. In January 1873, Quay managed Cameron's campaign for re-election to the Senate. The Republicans had a majority of 31 overall in the legislature, but dissident Republicans were promoting the industrialist Charlemagne Tower, a political novice, for the seat. Quay disposed of the challenge by calling an early caucus of the Republicans in the legislature, which Tower was unprepared for, and Cameron won easy re-election.

With Cameron re-elected to the Senate and Quay as Governor Hartranft's chief advisor, the Cameron machine was much more deeply entrenched than it had been before the Liberal Republican challenge. When not in Washington, Cameron, by now in his mid-seventies, spent time traveling, increasingly leaving day-to-day administration of the machine to his son Don Cameron, Quay, and Robert Mackey, a Cameron lieutenant who served five one-year terms as state treasurer in the 1860s and 1870s.

Quay was a delegate to the 1876 Republican National Convention, and with Don Cameron helped frustrate the ambitions of Senator James G. Blaine of Maine in favor of those of Ohio Governor Rutherford B. Hayes. Don Cameron and Quay offered Blaine's managers the state's votes in exchange for a promise to appoint a Pennsylvanian to the Cabinet but Blaine refused. The following year Quay would write to Hayes, "I am immediately responsible for the action of the Pennsylvania delegation which resulted in your nomination. Mr. Blaine will tell you this ..." Quay was chairman of the state Republican Party, and helped win the state for Hayes over Samuel Tilden by fewer than 10,000 votes despite a frosty relationship with the nominee. This was the state in which Hayes won the most electoral votes. With the presidential election disputed, Quay was among the Republicans invited by President Grant to go to Louisiana, one of the states at issue, and investigate the situation there, which he did, acting as a partisan for the Republicans. An electoral commission ruled for Hayes. Grant had made Don Cameron Secretary of War; Hayes refused to retain him or appoint anyone else from Pennsylvania. Angered, Simon Cameron resigned from the Senate, though he engineered the election of his son Don by the legislature as his replacement.

The Democrats did well in Pennsylvania's 1877 elections, making the following year's elections important, especially since Hartranft's successor was to be elected and Don Cameron's Senate seat would be filled by the 1879 legislature. With Quay and Mackey from western Pennsylvania and the Camerons based in Harrisburg, Philadelphia had no representation at the high levels of the Republican machine. They decided that Quay should relocate to Philadelphia to take on a new, and lucrative, position as County Recorder. The legislature duly created the position, and Hartranft appointed Quay, who resigned as Secretary of the Commonwealth, to it; Quay relocated to Philadelphia, taking a large double house at 11th and Spruce Streets. The maneuver backfired, as Philadelphians were resentful it was not filled by one of their own. Quay worked to elect a Republican governor and legislature, persuading out of staters like House Minority Leader James A. Garfield of Ohio to give speeches in Pennsylvania. Before returning to his home in Beaver, he stayed in Philadelphia long enough to see out the elections, in which Republican Henry M. Hoyt was narrowly elected by a plurality, and the Republicans gained a majority in both houses of the legislature. Though Mackey died on New Year's Day 1879, Don Cameron was re-elected to a full term. Quay resigned, and was re-appointed as Secretary of the Commonwealth by Governor Hoyt. According to Pennsylvania politician and editor Alexander McClure, "It was in this campaign that Quay made himself the acknowledged Republican master in the State, as Mackey died a few weeks after the election, and Quay, green with the laurels of his great victory, became the supreme leader of the party."

== Rise to the Senate (1880–1887) ==
Quay was involved in a financial scandal in 1880. J. Blake Walters, cashier of the Pennsylvania Treasury, made deposits in favored banks using worthless securities, retaining the actual money for stock speculation with Quay and others. Amos C. Noyes was the treasurer, and with Walters gave assurances that the money would not be required from the banks until Quay and his associates had time to restore it. The speculation went badly, and when Samuel Butler, an anti-boss Republican, took office as treasurer in 1880, he demanded a full accounting of state funds. There was a deficit of about $250,000, (equivalent to $8,340,517 in 2025) for which Quay accepted responsibility and sold much of his property, with a gap of about $100,000 filled with a loan from Don Cameron, repaid in 1886 with, according to McClure, a legacy Quay had received. Quay's acceptance of responsibility satisfied the public, as did his statement that Walters (who killed himself) had acted without his instructions. Another source of money for Quay was Standard Oil; he had come to terms with John D. Rockefeller's company in 1879 and requested a "loan" of $15,000 in 1880, something Rockefeller thought was worth it. Quay continued to deal with Standard Oil financially until his death in 1904, throughout his time in the Senate.

To avoid sending a delegation supportive of Blaine to the 1880 Republican National Convention in Chicago, Don Cameron and Quay called a state convention early in the year, before the Blaine supporters could organize, and got the selected delegation to agree to vote as a unit for former president Grant, who was seeking a third term. While Quay and Cameron would likely have made peace with a President Blaine to keep control of Pennsylvania, Grant was more amenable to the bosses' demands. Quay and Cameron acted in spite of the fact that Blaine was widely popular in Pennsylvania. The national convention deadlocked and the nomination fell to Garfield. Cameron and Quay were among the "Immortal 306", the delegates who voted for Grant on the 36th and final ballot. Although Garfield narrowly won both in Pennsylvania and nationwide, Quay's support for Grant meant that he and Cameron would not be in the president-elect's inner circle. This showed when the machine's candidate for Senate in early 1881, Henry W. Oliver, was blocked by the combined strength of the Democrats and independent Republicans; Garfield was asked by Quay to intervene, but he would not do so. The senatorship eventually fell to an independent Republican, Congressman John I. Mitchell. Later in 1881, the assassination of Garfield brought Chester A. Arthur, who was more aligned with the bosses, to the White House.

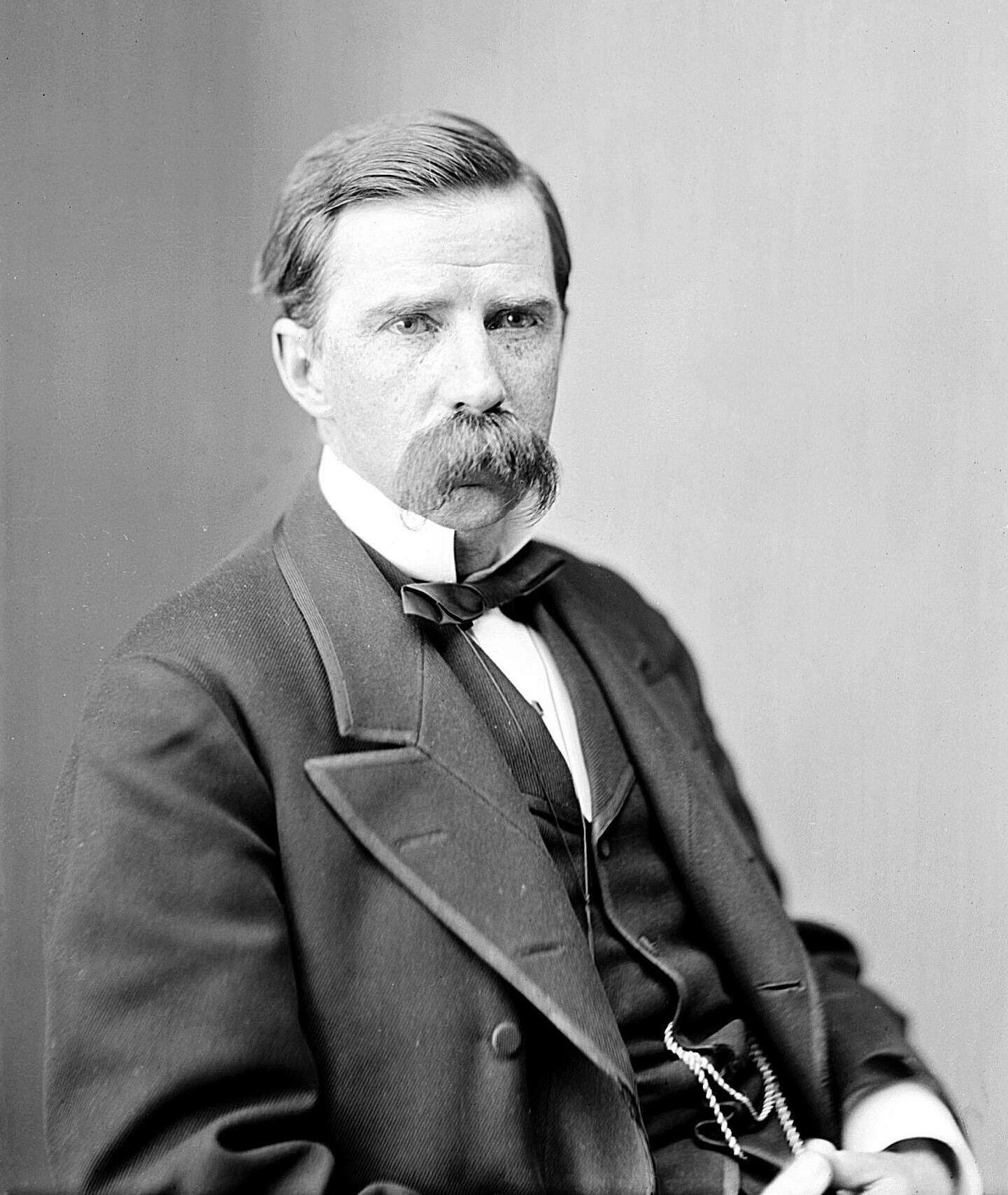
Senator Don Cameron, whom Quay eclipsed in the Pennsylvania Republican Party.

In 1882, a replacement for Governor Hoyt was to be elected, and the Republican Party divided. The Cameron-Quay machine backed James A. Beaver, and the independent Republicans, who backed the views of the Republican Party, but abhorred the bossism, supported John Stewart. When Hoyt endorsed Stewart, Quay resigned as Secretary of the Commonwealth in protest. Democrat Robert E. Pattison was elected. Part of the reason for the defeat was because Quay had insisted that Hoyt pardon legislators convicted of taking bribes to pass a bill reimbursing the Pennsylvania Railroad for losses incurred in the Railroad strike of 1877. Don Cameron had backed Beaver early in the campaign; his brusque style also helped prompt the reaction which defeated the candidate, who was himself well-liked in the Republican Party.

While Cameron demanded absolute loyalty to the party machine, in the years after Pattison's victory in 1882, Quay worked to reunite the party and conciliate the independent Republicans. When Blaine again sought the presidential nomination in 1884, Quay surrendered some party offices to the independents in exchange for the state party chairmanship going to his nominee, Thomas V. Cooper. Blaine was nominated, with Quay and Senator Cameron absent from the national convention, but was defeated by Democrat Grover Cleveland. With the White House in the hands of the other party, and with federal offices becoming less political due to the 1883 Pendleton Civil Service Act, Quay sought to dominate at the state level. Appointed state employees, of whatever parties, were dunned a percentage of their salaries, and would lose office if they did not pay. Businesses compensated Quay in cash because of his influence over members of the key committees of the state legislature. Pliable legislators were rewarded by Quay with money for themselves and their campaigns; those unwilling to deal faced well-financed candidates as they sought re-election. Friend and foe had their transactions recorded in files that became known as "Quay's coffins", along with any incidents that might embarrass them, to be brought forth as necessary. In doing so, Quay achieved a level of control over the state government that the Camerons had never reached. This was aided by a sense that Quay was different from Don Cameron, according to Frank W. Leach, Quay's personal secretary, "There was a general feeling that Colonel Quay was nearer the people [than Cameron]".

Requests for jobs litter the paper of politicians of this era. Quay was no exception. His correspondence with Governor James Addams Beaver invariably dealt with two subjects: getting elected and putting people into offices. Both were inseparable functions of the boss, and, with building a war chest, demanded constant attention.

— Historian William Alan Blair

Quay had long wanted to become a U.S. senator, if only to place himself on the same footing as Don Cameron, and McClure related that Quay had confided that he had considered taking Curtin's place in the 1867 senatorial battle. Quay wanted Senator Mitchell's seat, that would be filled by the legislature in early 1887. In 1885, he sought election as state treasurer. This would allow him tremendous control over the party apparatus, and a strong position from which to fight the battle to gain the Senate seat in 1887. Quay, who stated the race for treasurer was one for "self-protection and self-preservation" as others maneuvered within the party, faced some criticism at his attempt to gain the office of treasurer, but had no serious opposition at the Republican convention, and was easily elected. James K. Pollock, in his article on Quay for the Dictionary of American Biography, stated that Quay ran for the office of treasurer to gain vindication after the 1880 treasury scandal. Possession of this office would always be critical to the Quay machine; he once stated, "I don't mind losing the governorship or a legislature now and then, but I always need the state treasuryship."

In his new office, Quay had the funds of the state at his command. His ability to deposit state moneys in friendly banks led to an income of some $150,000 per year to the machine. Loans could be granted to favored individuals, with interest or security not required. To gain the senatorship, Quay needed the Republicans to have a successful 1886 election. As part of the deal to become state treasurer, he had agreed to support the party's 1882 candidate, Beaver, who was now acceptable to both machine and independent Republicans. Quay became the power behind the Beaver campaign. When one reporter asked Quay to arrange an interview with Beaver, Quay agreed and handed the reporter an unsealed envelope with a note inside, "Dear Beaver: Don't talk. M.S. Quay." With a united party at his back, Beaver was elected along with the entire Republican statewide ticket, and the Republicans had nearly a two-thirds majority in each house of the legislature.

Determined to be elected by as near a unanimous vote as possible, Quay arranged conferences in each congressional district to which the legislators of that district were invited and told to support the majority sentiment, that is for Quay. On January 4, 1887, the Republican legislative caucus nominated Quay with 154 votes to 9 for the runner-up, Galusha Grow. When the two houses of the legislature voted, Quay received two-thirds majorities in each, and was declared elected a senator. According to John W. Oliver in his journal article on Quay, "By this time Quay had become the undisputed political leader of Pennsylvania. More than that, he was rapidly becoming one of the recognized leaders of the Republican party throughout the nation."

== U. S. Senate ==
=== 1888 presidential campaign ===
Col. [Thomas J.] Grimeson still hopes to be nominated by the Republicans for State Treasurer. Quay hopes not. The friends of Grimeson recognize with sadness the fact that Quay's hopes generally become realities.

— "Political Notes", The Valley Spirit (Chambersburg, Pa.), August 8, 1887, p. 3

Although Quay's first term in the Senate began March 4, 1887, Congress at that time did not convene until December, and so, not yet sworn in, Quay remained as treasurer; he resigned in August. He chose state senator Boies Penrose of Philadelphia to act for him while he was absent in Washington. With Quay away for part of the year in Washington, he needed someone in Harrisburg to deal with the governor and legislature, and run the state organization. Penrose proved an effective choice; Quay, through Penrose, would exercise unparalleled power over state politics. Congress convened in December, but with Democratic President Cleveland still in office, the term was relatively quiet for Quay.

As the 1888 Republican National Convention in Chicago approached, several favorite son candidates were seeking support to become the nominee to challenge Cleveland. Blaine had been ambiguous about whether he would be a candidate, though he still had adherents. Quay was the chairman of the Pennsylvania delegation, which did not strongly support any particular candidate, though there were some leanings toward Ohio Senator John Sherman – the Camerons were related by marriage to him. Quay was willing to support Senator Sherman, but primarily he wanted a candidate who, if victorious, would reward Pennsylvania for its support. The convention deadlocked; Quay, realizing that Sherman could not win, opened negotiations with the managers of former senator Benjamin Harrison of Indiana. Quay wanted a written commitment to appoint a Pennsylvanian acceptable to Quay to the cabinet, but Harrison refused. Nevertheless, as the convention swung towards Harrison on the eighth and final ballot, Quay cast Pennsylvania's votes for the Indianan, but the circumstances did not give the state the credit for getting Harrison the nomination as Quay had hoped.

At the time, the chairman of the Republican National Committee (RNC) served as campaign manager for the presidential candidate, and Quay, a member of that committee, remained away from its post-convention session in New York. He was elected as RNC chairman by a large margin. Quay recruited Philadelphia businessman John Wanamaker to do much fundraising. Wanamaker contributed $10,000 himself, led a committee of ten businessmen who contributed an equal sum, and raised over $200,000. Though the sums were not outlandish by later standards, they were at the time the largest amount ever raised in a presidential campaign. Among those Quay appointed to the national executive campaign committee was Cleveland industrialist Mark Hanna, introducing the future senator to national politics. Quay's technique of assessing corporations for campaign contributions equal to a percentage of their assets would be copied by Hanna when he was RNC chair during the 1896 election.

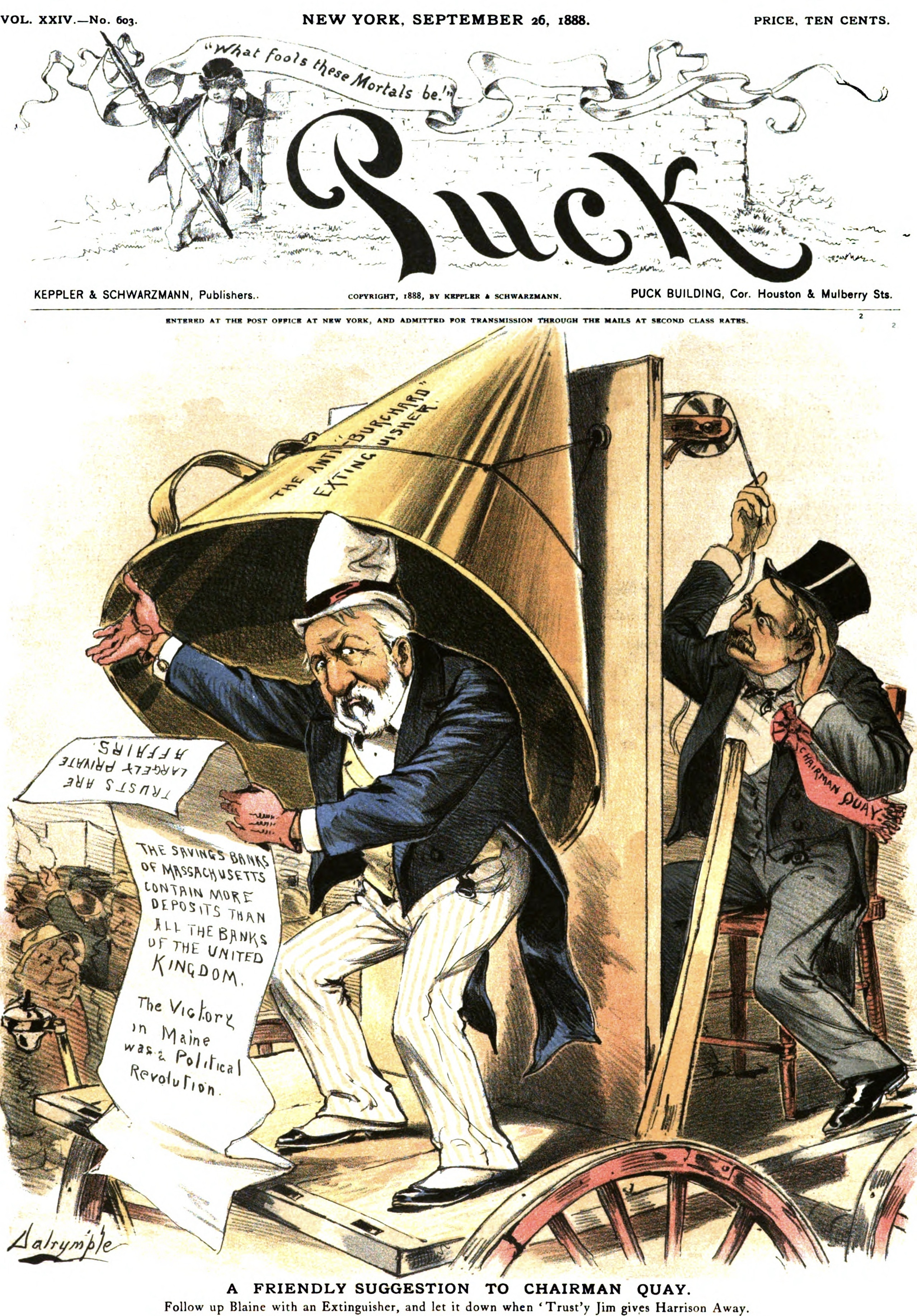
Quay drops an extinguisher on Blaine to prevent another damaging remark, Puck magazine, September 26, 1888

While Quay ran the overall organization out of New York City, Harrison conducted a front porch campaign from his hometown of Indianapolis. Quay originally opposed Harrison's plan, but in August, wired to the candidate, "Keep at it, you're making votes." Quay had feared that speeches by Harrison would interfere with his plan to replace the traditional Republican technique of waving the bloody shirt (blaming the Democrats for starting the Civil War) with a campaign to educate the voters on the issues with pamphlets and broadsides. Blaine's 1884 campaign had been derailed when Rev. Samuel D. Burchard, at a rally with the candidate present, called the Democrats the party of "Rum, Romanism and Rebellion", and both Quay and Harrison proved determined to avoid another damaging unscripted remark. After Blaine gave a speech describing trusts as innocuous business associations with which no one should interfere, a position contrary to the Republican platform, Quay saw to it that he stuck to less-controversial topics, and limited his speaking engagements.

Quay believed that vote fraud committed by Tammany Hall had given Cleveland New York's electoral votes in 1884, and the election, and the senator was determined to prevent a repetition. To ensure that voter fraud did not occur in New York City, Quay hired agents whose work was ostensibly to compile a city directory, but which would contain the names of all of the city's eligible voters, greatly reducing the scope for voter fraud. Once the work was completed, Quay made it known. He offered rewards for providing evidence resulting in convictions for illegal registration or illegal voting, something the public took more seriously after the first reward paid was for the conviction of a Republican. McClure stated that Quay used some of the campaign fund to bribe Tammany Hall leaders who were disenchanted with Cleveland. He also sent money to win Southern congressional districts, and hired Pinkerton detectives to protect GOP-voting African-Americans there, leading to gains and Republican control of the House of Representatives in the next Congress.

There was the start of a scandal just before the election when a letter from Republican campaign treasurer William W. Dudley offering advice as to how to organize men to vote multiple times was pulled from the mails. Quay responded with outrage that a letter had been opened, threatening prosecutions for interfering with the mails, and the election occurred before the scandal could fully develop. Although Cleveland got more votes in New York City, Harrison won New York and the presidency despite losing the national popular vote. Harrison credited "Providence" with his victory, a remark which prompted Quay to state that "Providence hadn't a damn thing to do with it", adding that Harrison would never know how close to the gates of the penitentiary some of his supporters had come to make him president. Despite Harrison's comments, the successful 1888 campaign gave Quay a national reputation, proving he could elect a president.

Quay met with Harrison in Indianapolis on December 19, 1888, and made recommendations as to appointments, urging that Blaine and Wanamaker not be given cabinet positions, but be given diplomatic posts, and that his deputy at the RNC, James Clarkson, be appointed to the cabinet. In each case, Quay was ignored. Blaine was made Secretary of State, and Wanamaker took the patronage-rich position of Postmaster General. Quay, who did not want a cabinet post for himself, supported the appointment once it was announced, for it at least put a Pennsylvanian in the cabinet.

Although Quay publicly backed the appointment of Wanamaker, he and Senator Cameron were incensed, as Harrison had failed to abide by the usual custom of discussing the nomination in advance with the nominee's home-state senators, and Wanamaker's appointment led to a break between Quay and Harrison. The appointment of Wanamaker proved a mixed blessing at best for Quay, since it elevated to high office a man who would be a thorn in his side for years to come, and the new Postmaster General enraged him by removing one of Quay's aides from his job with the post office.

=== Harrison years (1889–1893) ===
Quay and Harrison quickly came to differ about presidential appointments of federal officials. The president wanted to keep control of appointments and minimize the possibility of appointing corrupt people who might reflect badly on him; the state bosses had made promises during the campaign they needed to make good on or lose influence. The situation was made worse when the newspapers characterized each Pennsylvania appointment as either a victory for Quay or for Harrison, something that both men were aware of. In one incident, Quay handed Harrison a list of people he and Cameron wanted appointed, and replied, when the president asked for their qualifications, that the senators from Pennsylvania vouched for them. Harrison refused to appoint without making investigations, saying he could not blindly delegate the power of appointment. In another incident, Quay tried to discourage an office seeker by telling him the president likely would disregard a recommendation. The office seeker, incredulous, asked, "Doesn't he know that you elected him?" to which Quay replied, "No. Benny thinks God did it."

When Congress convened in December 1889, the Republicans, in full control of government for the first time since the Grant administration, were anxious to get their legislative priorities through that had been campaign pledges in 1888: tariff legislation, monetary legislation, and an elections bill that would allow African-Americans in the South to more freely cast a ballot. The monetary legislation, the Sherman Silver Purchase Act, passed Congress in May 1890. The tariff bill, the McKinley Tariff (named for its sponsor, House Ways and Means Committee chair William McKinley of Ohio), passed the House in May 1890 with no Democrats in favor, but languished in the Senate, while the Lodge Bill, to reform federal elections in the South, passed the House in July, but faced uncertain prospects in the Senate, as white Southerners saw it as a return to Reconstruction.

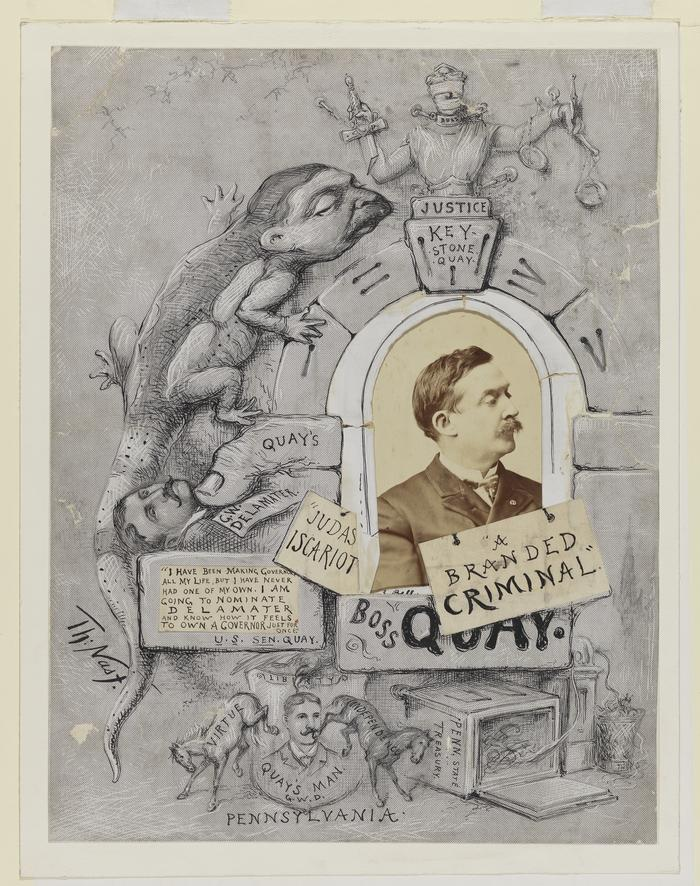
Thomas Nast cartoon calling Quay "a branded criminal", 1890

Quay wanted the tariff to pass because it was supported by many manufacturers who helped finance the Republican Party, especially in Pennsylvania, and he had made promises of protectionist policies during the 1888 campaign. On the other hand, African Americans had no financial gifts to bestow. He also believed the Lodge Bill would provoke renewed sectional conflict. He sought to break the deadlock over the two bills by introducing a resolution in the Republican caucus to set a definite date to vote on the McKinley Tariff while postponing consideration of most other bills, including the Lodge elections legislation, until the next session of Congress in December. This appalled Harrison and bitterly divided the Republican Senate caucus. Eventually a compromise was worked out whereby the Republicans agreed to press the tariff legislation and to bring up the Lodge Bill on the first day of the new session in December. Harrison signed the McKinley Tariff into law on October 1, 1890. When the Lodge Bill came to the floor of the Senate in December, Southern senators announced their intention to filibuster, and Republicans with other priorities, mostly from the West, joined with the Democrats to indefinitely postpone its consideration.

In the early part of the Harrison administration there began to be newspaper exposés about Quay and his methods. Although Quay supporters hailed him as a political genius, others deemed him a sinister power behind Harrison's throne. Others who joined the ranks opposing Quay were Pennsylvania reformers such as Henry Lea and Wharton Barker, and disappointed rivals for political power such as Christopher Magee of Pittsburgh. In early 1890, the New York World published a series of articles bringing up incidents from Quay's past, beginning with the 1867 Senate race, in which he was accused of accepting payments to recruit support for Simon Cameron. Quay responded with silence, which he was wont to do. In the 1890 elections, Republicans not only lost control of Congress, but in Pennsylvania, the Democrat, Pattison, was elected governor for a second, non-consecutive term. When asked why the Republican candidate, George W. Delamater had failed, Quay attributed it to "a lack of votes", but historian William Alan Blair stated that Delamater was defeated due to the opposition to Quay.

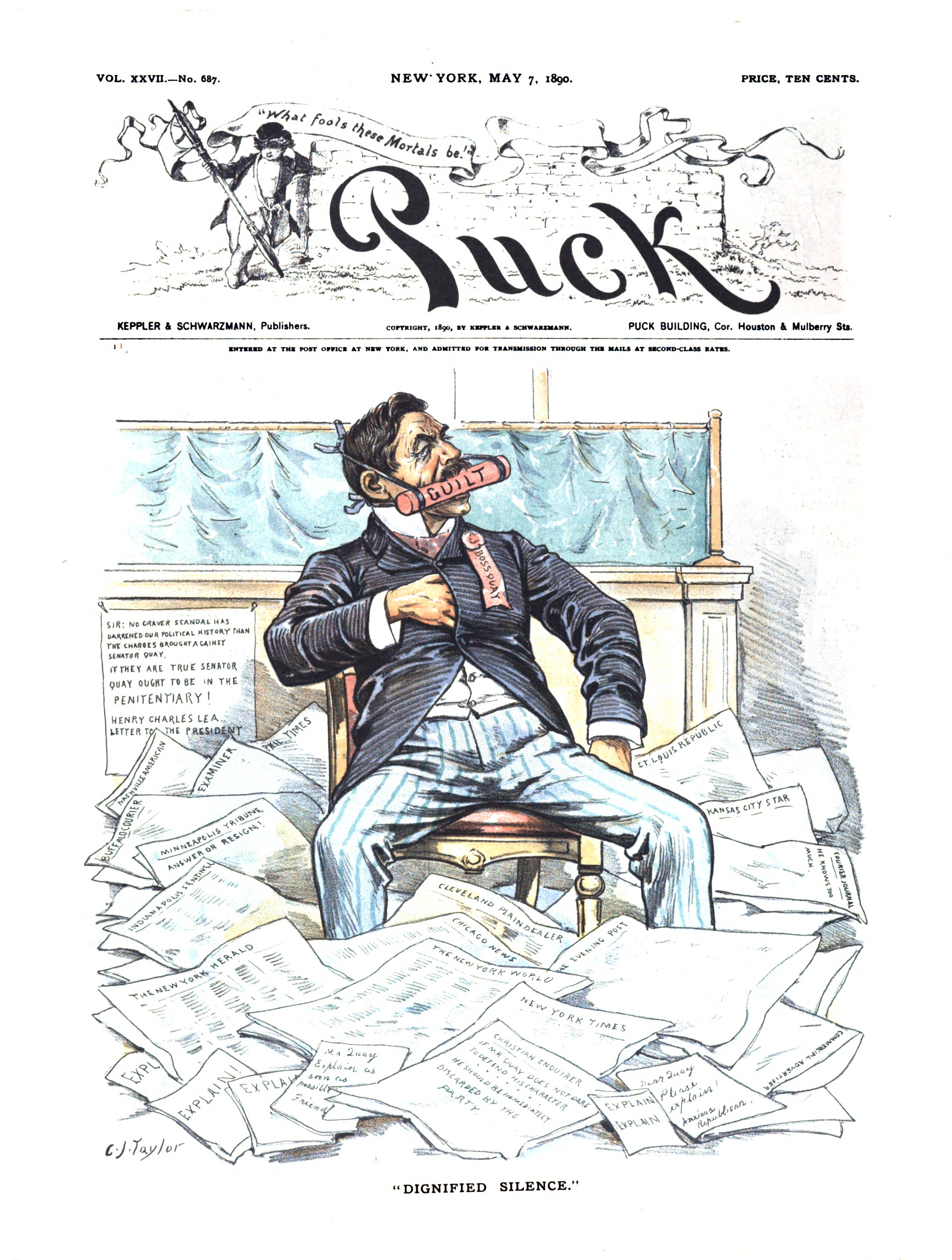
This 1890 Puck cover satirizes Quay's refusal to respond to the allegations.

Quay finally answered the allegations against him in February 1891, addressing the Senate, which he rarely did, and calling the allegations "false and foul to the core". This did little to satisfy his opponents, and there were calls for his resignation as RNC chairman. Harrison had long desired his departure, and was unwilling to defend him. Quay in June 1891 announced that he would not lead the next presidential campaign, and resigned the following month. Quay was not supportive of Harrison as the president faced renomination in 1892, but also disliked the only real rival, Blaine. At the 1892 Republican National Convention in Minneapolis, Quay realized that Harrison's renomination could not be prevented, and himself voted for McKinley, by then governor of Ohio, who was third in the balloting although not a declared candidate. Not wishing to be deprived of patronage if Harrison was re-elected, the senator pledged to work for the Republican ticket, but did little until October, when after negotiations and unknown concessions, he appeared at campaign headquarters, and pledged to help raise money. Nevertheless, Harrison was defeated by former president Cleveland. According to Pollock, Quay's "break with Harrison and his failure to take an active part in the campaign of 1892 was [sic] one of the prime factors in the Democratic victory of that year".

The 1892 legislative elections were also of concern to Quay as the following year's legislature would vote on whether to give him a second term as senator. There was opposition to Quay within the Republican Party, largely centered on Philadelphia, though Pittsburgh bosses such as Magee were also opposed to him, and put forth Congressman John Dalzell of Allegheny County as a rival. In addition to bossism, Quay was attacked for his sporadic attendance in Congress, which he defended by stating he was still often ill from his exertions in the 1888 presidential race, and had to spend time at his Florida home at St. Lucie. His statements were bolstered when he fell ill early in 1892, causing his wife Agnes to make one of her rare trips away from Beaver to tend to him in Florida. Dalzell was vulnerable to attack as a railroad and corporation lawyer, and an agreement was reached to place both their names on the Republican primary ballot, local legislators in theory being bound to abide by the result. With support from fellow Civil War veterans, Quay defeated Dalzell in almost every county, was the overwhelming choice of the Republican legislative caucus in January 1893, and won his second term later that month with two-thirds of the legislature voting for him.

=== Cleveland administration; rise of McKinley (1893–1896) ===
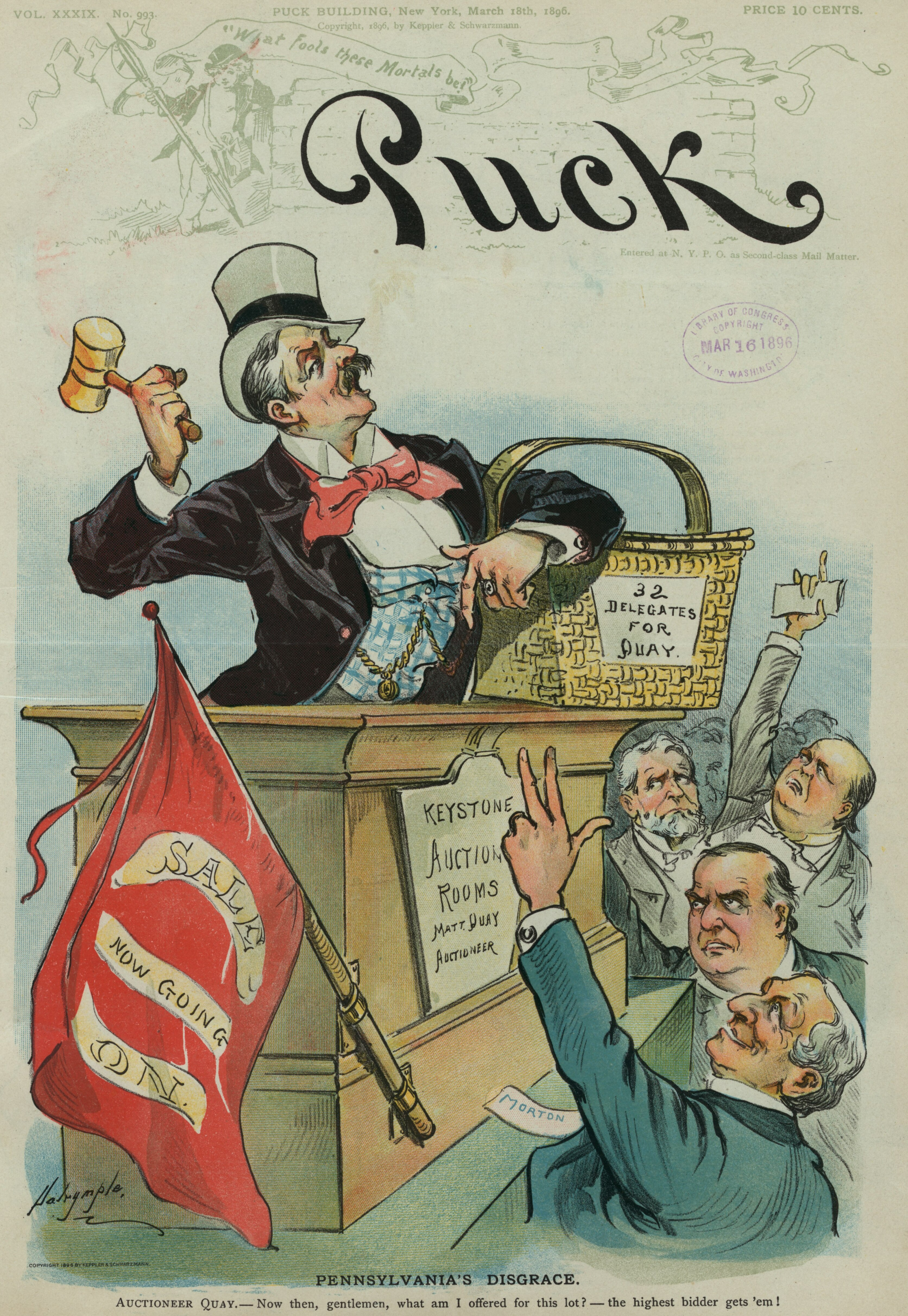
"Pennsylvania's disgrace": Quay is shown auctioning off his convention support. McKinley stands, center, among the bidders.

With Cleveland back in the White House, the Republicans had only minority status in Congress. The Democrats wanted to revisit the McKinley Tariff, but other matters, such as the repeal of the Sherman Silver Purchase Act, had higher priority, and it was not until 1894 that what became known as the Wilson-Gorman Tariff passed the House. Seeking to preserve protectionist tariffs for Pennsylvania's manufacturers, Quay threatened to talk the original bill to death. Since he had not addressed the Senate on a legislative matter in his first term, he was not taken seriously, but he proceeded to do what was very close to that, for the bill that eventually emerged from the Senate was so transformed that President Cleveland refused to sign it, letting it pass into law without his signature. Quay kept control of the Senate floor for over two months, from April 14 to June 16, 1894, himself consuming 14 legislative days, and did not conclude his remarks until he and other pro-tariff legislators had secured a compromise that preserved tariffs on manufactures, as favored by Pennsylvania industry, and included other protectionist provisions. John Oliver wrote, "one can readily see the connection between Quay's fight for a high protective tariff and liberal contributions from the Pennsylvania manufacturers".

Quay faced further rebellion within the Pennsylvania Republican Party in 1895. Republicans had elected Daniel H. Hastings as governor in 1894; he was the candidate the reform element had wanted in 1890 instead of Delamater, and, this time, Quay acquiesced in his nomination. With Hastings elected, the anti-Quay faction pressed its advantage, defeating Penrose in his attempt to gain the Republican nomination for mayor of Philadelphia in early 1895. With Governor Hastings friendly to the opposition, Quay brought the matter to a head by challenging the opposition-aligned chair of the Republican State Committee for his position. He appealed to rural politicians, alleging that the Philadelphia and Pittsburgh machines were trying to take them over. At the state convention, a deal was reached whereby Quay would get the post, and he moved the adoption of a platform that committed the party to reform. This delighted the opposition, and many embraced Quay as a reformed sinner.

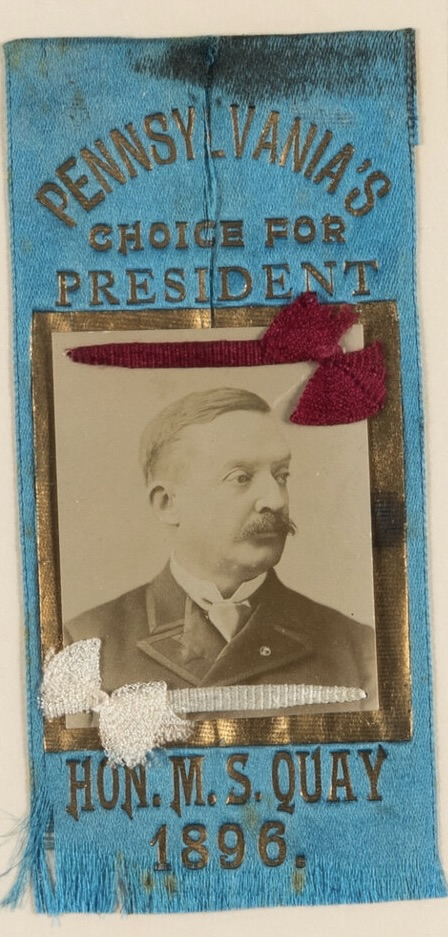
Lapel ribbon to be worn by supporter of Quay's candidacy for president, 1896

McKinley acted early to begin his presidential campaign, meeting with Republican politicians from the South in early 1895 at Thomasville, Georgia, the winter home of his friend and advisor, Mark Hanna. On his return north, Hanna met with former Michigan governor Russell Alger, who was acting as emissary for Quay and New York's Republican political boss, former senator Thomas C. Platt, to discuss a possible deal for the presidential nomination. Despite this and a second meeting, between Hanna and Quay, McKinley insisted he would make no deals to gain the Republican nomination. Platt and Quay decided to promote favorite son candidates to deny McKinley a first-round majority at the 1896 Republican National Convention and force him to the bargaining table. According to historian Clarence A. Stern, the opposition to McKinley "appears to have been to a large extent inspired by the desire of such politicians to gain the greatest possible advantage from the existing situation". Quay was Pennsylvania's favorite son and he found considerable enthusiasm in the state for nominating a Pennsylvanian as the state had been the largest to be consistently loyal to the party, but had never received a place on a Republican ticket. Assured of most of Pennsylvania's 64 votes, Quay journeyed to McKinley's home in Canton, Ohio, for discussions, but, according to the press, received only unspecified assurances. After Governor Hastings nominated Quay for president, the senator received 61 1/2 votes, third behind McKinley, who was nominated, and Speaker of the House Thomas B. Reed of Maine.

Although Quay was reluctant, he served on the national campaign advisory committee under the new RNC chairman, Hanna, reversing their positions from 1888. Quay played only a small role in the fall campaign, helping to run the campaign's New York headquarters, and making recommendations that Hanna spend more money in several Southern states, part of which Hanna agreed to. McKinley won the election over the Democratic and Populist candidate, William Jennings Bryan, winning Pennsylvania by almost 300,000 votes, providing nearly half of his margin in the popular vote.

=== Battles with Wanamaker; fight for re-election (1896–1901) ===
Don Cameron was to retire as senator when his term expired in 1897, and former postmaster general Wanamaker wanted his seat. Although Wanamaker gave his usual $10,000 to the Republican presidential candidate, he was not able to gain Quay's backing to become senator, as Quay feared that should he not gain re-election in 1899, Wanamaker might take power in the state party. According to McClure, the two initially agreed, but the pact fell apart when Wanamaker named someone to conduct financial transactions who was unacceptable to the senator. Wanamaker made speeches throughout Pennsylvania to promote himself as a senatorial candidate, and sought the endorsement of legislative candidates, but was faced with the strength of the Quay machine, which had the support of a majority of the elected Republican legislators. In January 1897, Penrose defeated Wanamaker in the Republican caucus, 133–75, and was elected as Pennsylvania's junior senator. An angered Wanamaker would constantly attack and oppose Quay until the senator's death in 1904.

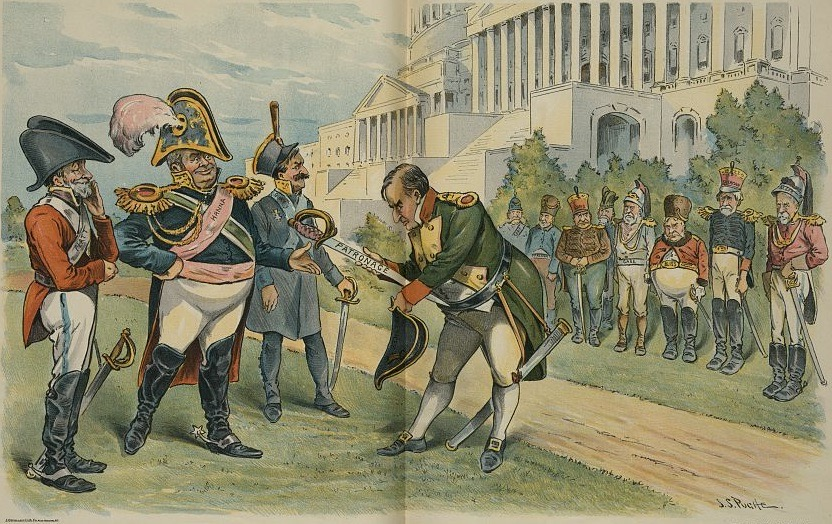
This August 1897 Puck cartoon shows McKinley (center) surrendering the sword of patronage to Republican political bosses (from left) Platt, Hanna and Quay

In the aftermath of the Senate battle, President McKinley turned over patronage appointments in Pennsylvania to Quay and Penrose; Wanamaker requested that a neighbor of his be appointed postmaster of a fourth-class post office, but was turned down. Wanamaker entered the campaign for the Republican nomination for governor in 1898, campaigning statewide and delivering speeches on "Quayism and Boss Domination in Pennsylvania Politics". He was defeated by Congressman William A. Stone, a Quay loyalist. Nevertheless, during the fall campaign, Wanamaker made 140 speeches, hoping to generate enough opposition to Quay to defeat his re-election bid when the legislature met in January 1899.

On October 3, 1898, Quay was arrested for conspiracy to defraud the People's Bank of Philadelphia. Quay had arranged in 1896 for $1,000,000 of state funds (equivalent to $38,700,000 in 2025) to be deposited in it and had persuaded John S. Hopkins, cashier and manager of the bank, that the funds be invested in the Metropolitan Traction Company of New York, sending a telegram: "If you buy and carry a thousand Met for me I will shake the plum tree", believed by investigators to mean that funds from the state treasury would be used to cover the speculation. The stock collapsed, the bank failed, and Hopkins fatally shot himself. It was alleged that the bank was paying the interest on state funds not to the state treasury, but to Quay. In spite of the allegations, Stone was victorious by over 110,000 votes.

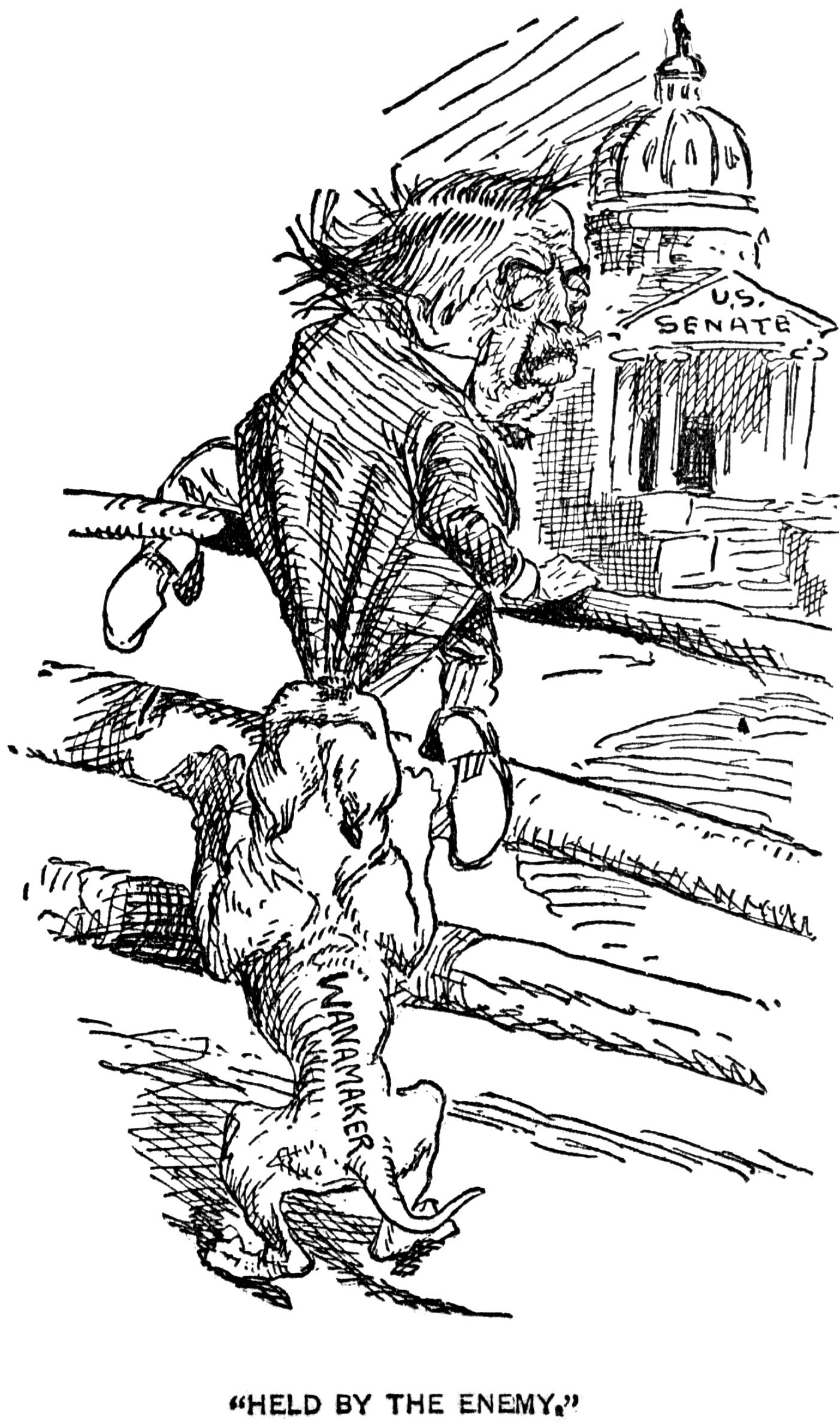
Homer Davenport cartoon depicting Quay "held by the enemy" (Wanamaker) and prevented from going to the Senate

Quay was the choice of the Republican legislative caucus in January 1899, but some remained away and his support was not enough for the necessary majority of the legislature with the two houses meeting in joint assembly. For the next three months, the legislature deadlocked as Quay's term in the Senate ended, leaving a vacancy. Quay had a sufficient hold over the Democratic legislative leaders to prevent them from uniting with the anti-Quay Republicans to elect a senator, and the deadlock persisted through 79 ballots. Quay was finally brought to trial on the allegations in April 1899, but the prosecution rested an hour after the legislature adjourned, having failed to elect a senator, and he was quickly acquitted, leading Quay's defenders to allege that the indictment had been purely political.

Within an hour of the acquittal, Governor Stone appointed Quay to fill the vacant Senate seat. Since at the time the Constitution limited governor's appointments to the Senate to when a vacancy occurred during the recess of the legislature, there were immediate questions as to whether this was a valid appointment, and when Congress convened in December, Quay was not seated, but his credentials were referred to a committee. In January 1900, that committee recommended that Quay not be seated by a 5–4 vote, and in April the Senate refused to seat Quay by a vote of 33–32 in a vote that cut across party lines, with the Republicans against Quay including Hanna, who had become senator from Ohio in 1897.

Angered by Hanna, Quay found the opportunity for revenge at the 1900 Republican National Convention in Philadelphia. With the death of Vice President Garret Hobart in 1899, McKinley needed a new running mate. Some supported New York Governor Theodore Roosevelt, seen as a war hero and a reformer. Among those who wanted Roosevelt on the national ticket was Platt, who did not want him as governor and figured he would be harmless as vice president. Hanna was appalled at the prospect of putting someone he deemed impulsive so near the reins of power. When approached by Platt, Quay was happy to agree to help, in part because of a desire to avenge himself on Hanna. According to McClure, "it was the desertion of Quay by Hanna in the contest for Quay's admission to the Senate that made Roosevelt the nominee for Vice-President against his own earnest protest, and thus made him President of the United States."

In August 1900, the Republican State Convention endorsed Quay and denounced the Senate's action, urging the following year's legislature to return him to the Senate. With Wanamaker again making speeches during the fall campaign, Quay also took to the campaign trail. Despite serving two terms in the Senate, he had rarely made a public address, but spoke 19 times across Pennsylvania in October and November 1900. The McKinley/Roosevelt ticket was elected, winning Pennsylvania, but it was uncertain whether Quay had enough support in the legislature to be elected.

Not enough Republicans attended the legislative caucus to provide a majority for Quay leaving him four votes short of a majority to elect. Quay was elected because two Democratic legislators voted for him, and two others remained away from the voting. According to McClure, "only one of Quay's masterly political ingenuity and skillful control of Democrats of easy virtue could have won out in the fight. One of the crucial votes in electing Quay was an ill Republican, brought on a stretcher from the hospital to the state capitol to cast his ballot. He languished, forgotten, in a hallway as his bearers joined in the celebrations of Quay's victory, got pneumonia and died. He was given an impressive funeral: both Quay and Penrose attended, wearing silk hats.

=== Final years and death (1901–1904) ===
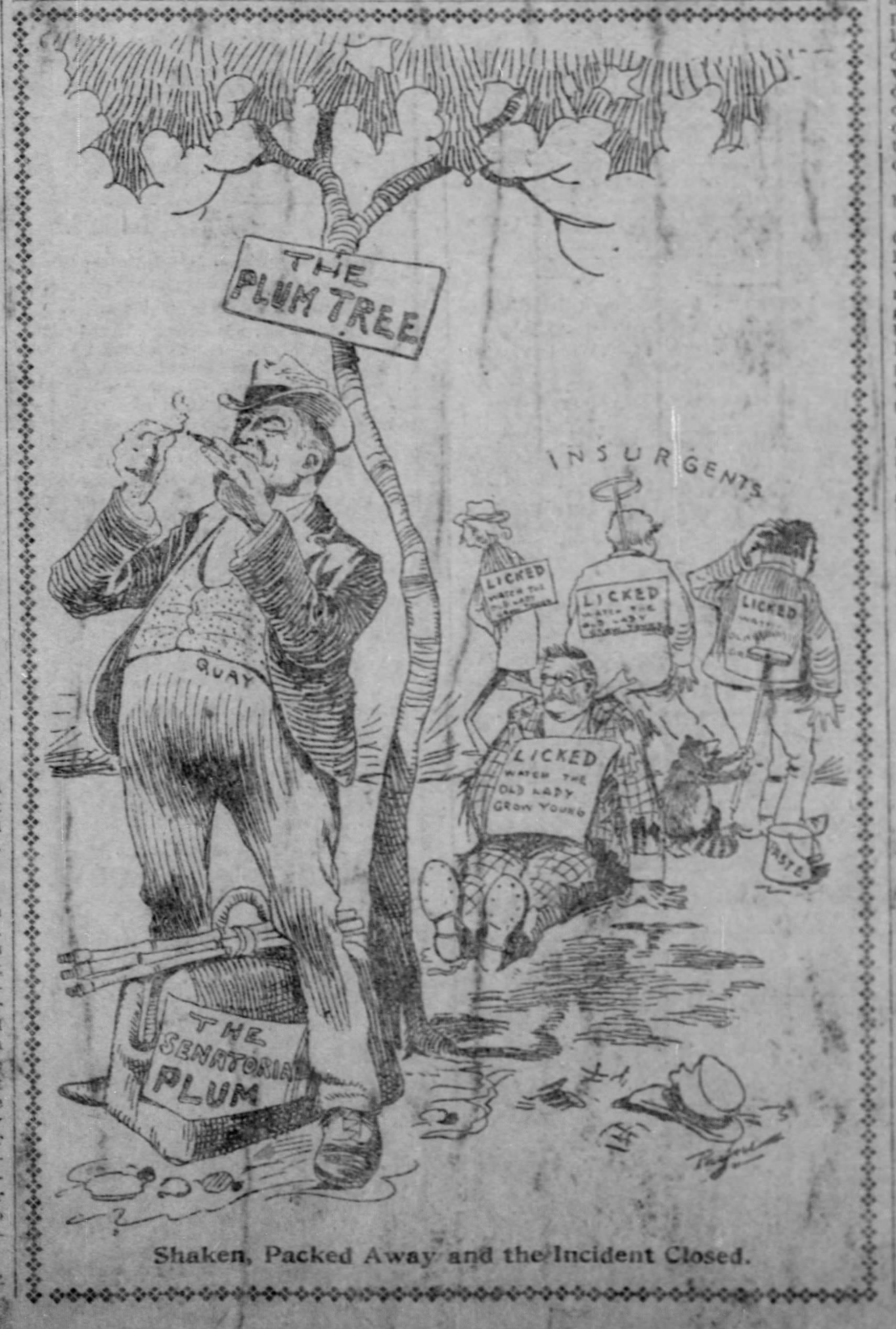
Quay celebrates his re-election under a plum tree, January 1901. From the Pittsburgh Commercial Gazette.

Quay was sworn in to his third term in the Senate on January 18, 1901, in a Senate chamber filled with his supporters, congratulatory telegrams, and flowers. In May, he let it be known he would not seek another term; the long battle over the seat had sapped his strength, and he planned no new political battles. In general, he held to that resolution, though with a few exceptions, and according to McClure, once he made that announcement, "the factional feeling that had harassed him for many years gradually perished".

The assassination of McKinley in September 1901 made Roosevelt president. The fact that he had been instrumental in getting Roosevelt the vice-presidential nomination in 1900 gave Quay little alternative but to support Roosevelt, and the president kept Quay loyal by giving him a major voice in patronage in Pennsylvania, even as he pursued reform policies. With Hanna opposed to Roosevelt and a presidential hopeful for 1904, Roosevelt's allying with Quay, and also Platt, kept the bosses from uniting against him. Roosevelt sometimes refused Quay's requests, as when the senator asked that a Pennsylvanian be appointed to the Isthmian Canal Commission, charged with building the Panama Canal. The president stated that appointment to the commission had to be entirely on merit.

Continued divisions in the Pennsylvania Republican Party led to losses in the off-year elections of 1901, and Quay feared this would get worse in 1902, when there would be elections for the governor and the legislature. John P. Elkin had wide support for governor among Quay's faction of the party, and had defended the senator before the Senate committee considering his credentials in 1899 and 1900. Quay believed it was necessary to nominate for governor a judge whose character was beyond suspicion. Hanna favored Elkin's nomination, and Quay feared that the Ohioan might control Pennsylvania's delegation to the next national convention through Elkin. Thus, Quay pressed for the nomination of Judge Samuel Pennypacker of Philadelphia. Pennypacker was reluctant when approached by a Quay emissary, but agreed; he wrote that his election as governor "came to me without the lifting of a finger, the expenditure of a dime, or the utterance of a sigh". Pennypacker's election postponed the divide in the Republican Party in the state until after Quay's death. In office, Pennypacker generally did what Quay wanted, but sometimes differed from him over appointments to office.

One battle Quay undertook in his last years was statehood for Oklahoma, New Mexico and Arizona. Both major parties had in their platforms pledged support for statehood, and a bill to accomplish this passed the House of Representatives in 1902. One reason Quay wanted the bill to pass is that it might allow William "Bull" Andrews, a longtime Quay lieutenant with financial interests in New Mexico Territory, to reach the Senate. Quay, a member of the Committee on Territories, amassed support in the Senate for the bill, likely enough to pass, but the committee chair, Albert Beveridge of Indiana, felt the three territories were not yet ready for statehood, and used Senate procedures to evade a vote on the bill through the remainder of the session. Quay remaining in Washington through the winter of 1903 to seek passage of his bill, rather than spending part of the winter in Florida as usual, hurt his health. The territories did not attain statehood during Quay's lifetime.

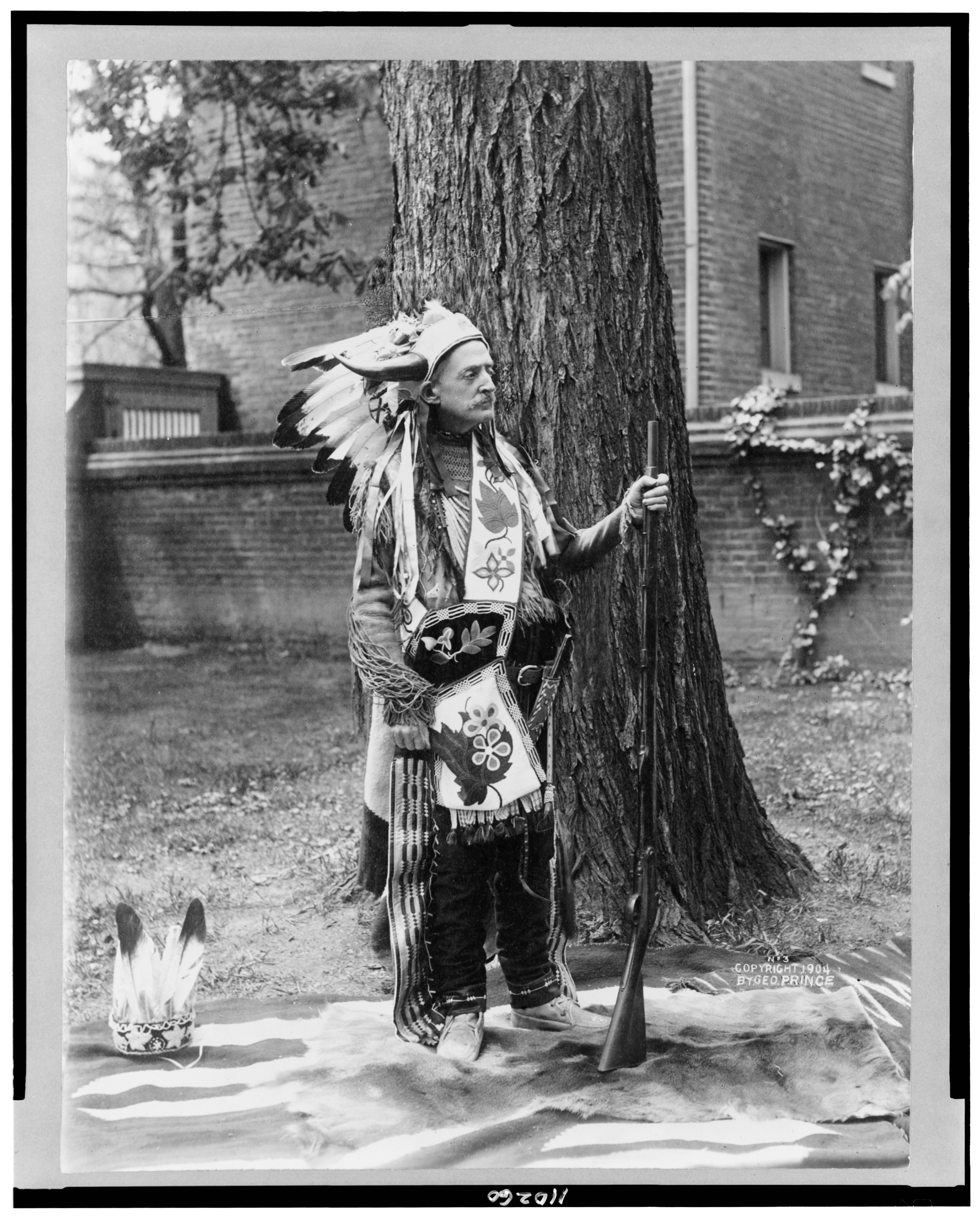
Quay in Native American garb, 1904

Oliver considered Quay a "real friend of the American Indian". Throughout his Senate career, he was an advocate for Native Americans, but especially was so in his later years. Although Indians had no contributions to give to Quay's machine, he took up their causes, believing they were treated badly by the Federal government. He was a member of the Senate Committee on Indian Affairs; when Chief Joseph and his party came to Washington, they expended all their funds and were unable to get home, Quay paid their railroad fare. During his visits to Florida, he took an interest in the welfare of the Seminole Indians.

Beginning in about 1903, Quay's health deteriorated. He went to his brother's country estate at Morganza, Pennsylvania, in April 1904, but knowing he was dying, he asked to be conveyed home to Beaver. Suffering from gastritis, he continued to lose weight and strength. Quay could read and speak several languages, possessing one of the finest private libraries in America. One day in late May 1904, he asked to be taken into his library, where he read a little, handled the volumes lovingly, and after he fell asleep, was taken back to his room. He died in Beaver on May 28, 1904.

Quay was buried, in Beaver, on May 31, 1904. Shops throughout the area were closed. Trains brought the general public from Pittsburgh and dignitaries from Harrisburg and Washington. Among the senators attending the funeral were Republicans Penrose, Platt and Joseph B. Foraker of Ohio, and Democrats Arthur Gorman of Maryland and Benjamin Tillman of South Carolina. His headstone gives his name and those of his parents, his dates of birth and death, and implora pacem (Latin for "Pray for peace").

== Personal life and memorials ==
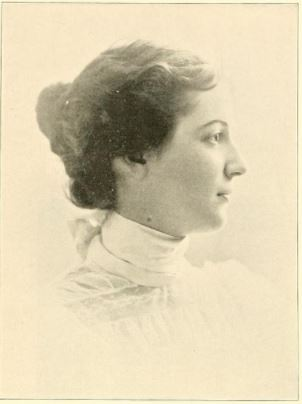
Agnes Barclay Quay

In 1855, Quay married Agnes Barclay (1831–1911); they had five children; the eldest, Richard Rogers Quay, served in the Pennsylvania legislature. The others were named Andrew Gregg Curtin Quay (a career army officer), Mary Agnew Quay, Coral Quay, and Susan Willard Quay.

In 1905, Hanover Square in Beaver was renamed Quay Square. A historical marker to Quay stands at 3rd and Insurance Streets there. The Matthew S. Quay House in Beaver has been designated as a National Historic Landmark. Another of his residences, the Roberts-Quay House in Philadelphia, was added to the National Register of Historic Places in 1976.

In recognition of his efforts towards New Mexico statehood, there is a Quay County in New Mexico, named for him in 1903 when it was established, as well as a small unincorporated community known as Quay. The former town of Quay, Oklahoma, was also named for him. A statue of Quay stands in the rotunda of the Pennsylvania State Capitol in Harrisburg.

Quay spent much time in Florida over the last fifteen years of his life, both for his health and for the fishing; local historian Jean Ellen Wilson dubbed him "St. Lucie County's first snowbird." Called "Florida's Third Senator" by Judge Minor Jones, he supported federal projects along the Indian River, where he owned property. Two of the houses he owned still stood as of 2010. In his honor, the municipality of Woodley, Florida was named Quay in 1902, but in 1925, amid the Florida land boom, it was renamed Winter Beach.

== Assessment ==
Under Quay’s leadership, Pennsylvania became the most Republican and boss-dominated state in the final decades of the century. His success required considerable manipulation, because he was not able to control the state’s burgeoning cities, Philadelphia and Pittsburgh. With his strength residing in the countryside, he kept the cities stirred up by pushing through the legislature charter reforms to limit the power of emerging city leaders or to pit the two cities against each other, but they nevertheless retained their Republican character. Thus, under his direction, the state delivered a Republican-dominated congressional delegation every two years and provided Republican electors every quadrennium. Quay attributed this unbroken success to an application of his definition of politics: "the art of taking money from the few and votes from the many under the pretext of protecting the one from the other."

— Historian James A. Kehl

Quay's death sparked renewed debate about him, though McClure stated that upon his death, "friend and foe bowed regretfully over the grave of Pennsylvania's ablest and most chivalrous political gladiator". The North American of Philadelphia reported that Quay's career was "a record of sustained victory", while his death "has removed from Pennsylvania a malign influence which for a generation has been the curse and shame of the Commonwealth [of Pennsylvania]". President Roosevelt sent his condolences, and Governor Pennypacker stated, "now that he is gone, the people of this state will know what they have lost and what they never quite appreciated."

By taking power from the Camerons in the mid-1880s, Quay restored the Pennsylvania Republican Party to power there at a time it was divided and out of office at both the state and federal levels, and continued the state as one of the largest and most loyal to the Republican Party. He was able to work with and conciliate many of those whom Don Cameron had alienated. Blair wrote that Quay's techniques were to "work one-on-one; keep quiet; maneuver behind the scenes". According to Pollock, Quay "is chiefly to be remembered for his brilliant and consummate genius as a politician. Never in the history of Pennsylvania, with all of its great politicians, has there been a man with such great powers of leadership in political organization. His whole life was a constant fight." Nevertheless, "many of his contemporaries believed him to be an utterly corrupt man, and yet his methods were no worse than those of his adversaries. He was certainly one of the best-hated men in politics." Wilson stated of Quay that from the time of his election as senator,

various combinations of avowed foes and turncoat friends fought to topple him; reformers attempted to wrest power from his grasp and destroy his political machine. Often his political survival was in doubt; there were times he survived by a very slim margin. He was indicted, arrested, beaten at the polls, attacked from the pulpit, criticized in the press. He endured to make two presidents and to serve three terms in the Senate.

Oliver deemed Quay, "the most colorful leader in Pennsylvania's history ... No man in all political history ever excelled him as a leader, a strategist, or an organizer".

Quay rarely addressed the Senate; his power was behind the scenes, exercised over dinner and in committee rooms. He authored no major legislation; his interest was in being able to control the flow of legislation. He chaired no major committees, but led the Committee on Public Buildings and Grounds. Almost every member of Congress needed a post office or other building to be constructed in his state or district, and his road to that goal lay through Quay, who could exact a price. According to Wendy J. Schiller and Charles Stewart, "holding a Senate seat was merely another means of keeping control over his political empire; he was far better known for keeping his eyes peeled on Pennsylvania politics than on the business conducted on the Senate floor."

Patronage in the hands of Quay was profitable: although Wanamaker's 1898 estimate that Quay controlled 14,705 government positions was possibly an exaggeration, the many positions available in a large state like Pennsylvania, where the holders or would-be holders could be dunned for contributions, raised large sums of money that Quay controlled. Such money was key to Quay's power. While state treasurer, he detected loopholes in the laws governing the office, and used them to his advantage, not only during his term of office, but over the next two decades as a series of loyalists occupied that office. Quay kept close control of the purse strings, deciding where money should be doled out. His successor as Pennsylvania's Republican boss, Penrose, stated, "Mr. Quay made it his policy to keep at least one hand on the public purse." He used state money and contributions from industrialists to benefit himself and elect favored candidates. This helped make participation in politics expensive since it required any candidate not acceptable to Quay to raise large sums of money to be successful. Nevertheless, by the close of Quay's career, the power of patronage was becoming an embarrassment, as he had too many friends and allies expecting preferment. In one case, Quay avoided making nineteen enemies by submitting twenty candidates for an office to Governor Stone, and got him to reject them all. Stone then announced his own selection: someone acceptable to Quay.

I desire to say that while to the public at large, to the people of the United States, it may seem that I am wantonly obstructing business, Senators on this floor know that I am doing it in the interest of millions of Pennsylvania capital and the wages of thousands of Pennsylvania workingmen.

— Matthew Quay on the floor of the Senate, 29 Congressional Record 2736 (March 3, 1897)

By the 20th century, progressive reformers sought to eliminate the boss system, and saw Quay as a prime target, resulting in the re-election deadlock of 1899. After Quay died, the Pennsylvania Republican Party fell into factions, first squabbling over the Senate seat (which fell to the state attorney general, Philander C. Knox) and then losing the election for treasurer in 1905 in a state Roosevelt had carried with two-thirds of the vote the previous year. Pennypacker responded by calling the legislature into special session to pass reform legislation. In controlling the machine after Quay's death (which he did until his own death in 1921), Penrose allowed reform measures such as the direct primary and a requirement of examinations for civil service jobs in Philadelphia.

Kehl stated that Quay, by the nature of his position as boss and senator, concerned himself more with the welfare of Pennsylvania than that of the nation.

Quay was even more committed to the status quo than most legislators were. Serving Pennsylvania rather than the United States, he contributed little to the national legislative program of his party. He was content to sit in silence while senatorial discussion resounded on all sides; he never championed any principle, not even the Republican doctrine of protection[ism]. Although he did speak on the tariff, he pronounced no theory, but merely demanded specific schedules for the iron and steel producers of his state. Once local appetites were appeased, he lapsed into legislative indifference until another issue important to his constituents arose. At the end of his career, such self-interest was disturbing to Republican leadership in the Senate. With his passing, many colleagues tacitly hoped for a successor more committed to issues national in scope and substantive in character.

== Notes ==
Political offices
| Preceded by William Livsey | Treasurer of Pennsylvania; 1885–1887 | Succeeded by William Livsey |
U.S. Senate
| Preceded by John Mitchell | United States Senator (Class 1) from Pennsylvania; 1887–1899; Served alongside: J. Donald Cameron, Boies Penrose | Vacant |
Party political offices
| Preceded by William Livsey | Republican nominee for Treasurer of Pennsylvania; 1885 | Succeeded by William B. Hart |
| Preceded by Benjamin Jones | Chair of the Republican National Committee; 1888–1891 | Succeeded by James Clarkson |
