= The Keys (English band) =

English, London-based band

The Keys were an English, London-based band active from 1979 until 1983. The band was formed by bassist Drew Barfield (later of the Big Heat and Los Pacaminos), guitarist Steve Tatler, Ben Grove, and Paul McCartney's former drummer Geoff Britton. Joe Jackson produced the band's only album, The Keys Album for A&M, from which came several singles: "One Good Reason", "I Don't Wanna Cry" and "Greasy Money".

== The Keys Album ==
Track listing: All tracks written by Drew Barfield and The Keys, unless otherwise noted.

Side one

1. "Hello Hello" – 3:30
2. "It Ain't So" – 2:28
3. "One Good Reason" – 3:15
4. "Listening In" – (Tatler, The Keys) – 3:06
5. "I Don't Wanna Cry" – 2:52
6. "Saturday To Sunday Night" – 4:00

Side two

7. "Spit It Out" – 2:38
8. "If It's Not Too Much" – 2:49
9. "Run Run Run" – (Grove, The Keys) – 2:47
10. "Greasy Money" – 3:30
11. "Back To Black" – 3:18
12. "World Ain't Turning" – 3:27

Personnel

- Ben Grove – guitar, vocals
- Steve Tatler – guitar, vocals
- Drew Barfield – bass, vocals
- Geoff Britton – drums
