= River Kwai =

River Kwai can refer to two rivers in western Thailand, a film or a novel:

- Khwae Yai River
- Khwae Noi River
- The Bridge on the River Kwai, film
- The Bridge over the River Kwai, novel
