= Terry Keays =

Australian rules footballer

Personal information
- Full name: Terence John Keays
- Born: 3 May 1970 (age 56)
- Original team: St Marys GJFC
- Height: 186 cm (6 ft 1 in)
- Weight: 85 kg (187 lb)

Playing career^{1}
Years	Club	Games (Goals)
1987–1990	Collingwood	20 (11)
1990–1992	Richmond	25 (29)
Total		45 (40)
- ^{1} Playing statistics correct to the end of 1992.

Career highlights
- Joseph Wren Memorial Trophy 1990

Terence John "Terry" Keays (born 3 May 1970) is a former Australian rules footballer who played with Collingwood and Richmond in the Victorian/Australian Football League (VFL/AFL). His grandfather Fred Keays represented both Fitzroy and Collingwood in the Victorian Football League.

Keays was just 16 years of age when he began playing senior VFL football in 1987, the youngest Collingwood footballer to debut since Rene Kink and Stephen Clifford in 1973. A utility, he played 10 games in his debut season and also represented Victoria in the Teal Cup that year.

Keays added just four games to his tally over the next two seasons, then made six appearances in 1990, a premiership year, the last of which was in round 20.

Keays was traded to Richmond for the fourth pick in the 1990 AFL draft, which Collingwood used to secure Jason McCartney. Keays missed just one game in the first 14 rounds of the 1991 AFL season, which was in between a five-goal haul in a win over Fitzroy and a seven-goal effort against Footscray at Western Oval. By the end of the season he had amassed 27 goals, placing him third in the Richmond goal-kicking behind Jeff Hogg (68) and Chris Naish (38).

In 1993 he played with the Frankston Football Club and although he was picked up again by Collingwood in the Mid-Season Draft, he didn't play another league game for the club.

He was a playing coach for Tasmanian club Latrobe in 1994 and topped the NTFL goal-kicking that season with 117 goals, including 18 goals in one match.

Keays ran second in the 1987 VFL Grand Final half time sprint.

== Sources ==
- Stoward, J. (2001) Australian rules football in Tasmania, self-published: Hobart. ISBN 0957751575
