= Michel Polnareff discography =

- Studio albums: 11
- Soundtrack albums: 4
- Live albums: 7
- Compilation albums: 24
- Singles: 56
- Collaborative albums: 1

This is the discography of French singer Michel Polnareff.

== Albums ==
=== Studio albums ===
Title	Album details	Peak chart positions								Certifications
Title	Album details	FRA	BEL (FL)	BEL (WA)	GER	JPN	QUE	SWI	US	Certifications
Michel Polnareff	Released: November 1966; Label: Disc'Az; Also known as Love Me, Please Love Me	30	—	—	5	97 (Note: Chart position is from 1971.)	—	—	—	FRA: Gold
Volume 2	Released: 1968; Label: Disc'Az	1	—	—	—	—	—	—	—	
Polnareff's	Released: January 1971; Label: Disc'Az	5	—	—	—	—	15	—	—	
Michel Polnareff	Released: 1974; Label: Atlantic	5	—	—	—	20	—	—	—	
Fame à la mode	Released: 1975; Label: Atlantic	4	—	—	—	38	—	—	117	FRA: Gold
Coucou me revoilou	Released: 1978; Label: Atlantic	1	—	—	—	47	—	—	—	FRA: Gold
Bulles	Released: 1981; Label: Disc'Az/Enuf	1	—	—	—	—	—	—	—	FRA: Platinum
Incognito	Released: 1985; Label: RCA/Enuf	—	—	—	—	—	—	—	—	FRA: Gold
Kāma-Sūtra	Released: 23 February 1990; Label: Epic	8	—	—	—	—	—	—	—	FRA: 2× Gold
Enfin !	Released: 30 November 2018; Label: Barclay	4	145	7	—	—	—	29	—	FRA: Gold
Polnareff chante Polnareff	Released: 18 November 2022; Label: Parlophone	4	—	3	—	—	—	20	—	FRA: Gold
Un temps pour elles	Released: 25 April 2025; Label: Parlophone	7	—	8	—	—	—	71	—	
"—" denotes releases that did not chart or were not released in that territory.

=== Collaborative albums ===
Title	Album details
Ménage à trois	Released: 1980; Label: Ariola; With Michel Colombier

=== Live albums ===
Title	Album details	Peak chart positions				Certifications
Title	Album details	FRA	BE (WA)	JPN	SWI	Certifications
Polnarévolution	Released: 1972; Label: Disc'Az	—	140 (Note: Chart position is from 2014.)	25	—	
Polnareff à Tokio	Released: 1972; Label: Epic; Japan-only release	—	—	8	—	
Show télé 82/Public	Released: 1982; Label: Disc'Az/Enuf	—	—	—	—	
Live at the Roxy	Released: May 1996; Label: Enough	1	11	—	—	FRA: Platinum
Ze (re) tour 2007	Released: 7 December 2007; Label: Enough	13	27	—	69	FRA: Gold
À l'Olympia	Released: 2 December 2016; Label: Enough	31	20	—	—	
La tournée historique	Released: 24 November 2023; Label: Froggy Day, Numeric Major	—	20	—	—	
"—" denotes releases that did not chart or were not released in that territory.

=== Soundtrack albums ===
Polnareff also composed the music to the films Erotissimo, L'indiscret and the television film La pomme de son œil, which didn't have an album release.

Title	Album details
La folie des grandeurs	Released: 1971; Label: Disc'Az; Soundtrack album for the film of the same name
D'Artagnan l'intrépide	Released: 1974; Label: Philips; Soundtrack album for the film of the same name
Lipstick	Released: July 1976; Label: Atlantic; Soundtrack album for the film of the same name
La vengeance du serpent à plumes	Released: 1984; Label: RCA/Enuf; Soundtrack album for the film of the same name

=== Compilation albums ===
Title	Album details	Peak chart positions				Certifications
Title	Album details	FRA	BE (WA)	JPN	SWI	Certifications
Le disque d'or des disques d'or	Released: January 1970; Label: Disc'Az	2	—	—	—	
Le disque d'or des disques d'or n°2	Released: 1971; Label: Disc'Az	—	—	—	—	
Now	Released: 21 June 1972; Label: Epic; Japan-only release	—	—	44	—	
Gold Disc	Released: 21 November 1972; Label: Epic; Japan-only release	—	—	15	—	
Michel Polnareff	Released: 1973; Label: Disc'Az, Epic	—	—	71	—	
Gift Pack Series	Released: 1 November 1973; Label: Epic; Japan-only release	—	—	26	—	
Pack 20	Released: 21 June 1974; Label: Epic; Japan-only release	—	—	55	—	
Polnacollection	Released: 21 November 1974; Label: Epic; Japan-only release	—	—	37	—	
New Gold Disc	Released: 21 June 1975; Label: Epic; Japan-only release	—	—	65	—	
Super star télé	Released: 1977; Label: Disc'Az	—	—	—	—	
Les grandes chansons de Michel Polnareff	Released: 1981; Label: Disc'Az	—	—	—	—	
La compilation	Released: 1991; Label: Epic/Sony Music	—	—	—	—	FRA: Platinum
Les premières années	Released: 1997; Label: Universal; 3xCD box set	—	—	—	—	
Nos maux mots d'amour	Released: 1999; Label: Universal	—	156	—	—	
Le meilleur de Michel Polnareff	Released: 26 April 2000; Label: Polydor; Japan-only release	—	—	29	—	
Passé présent	Released: 19 August 2003; Label: Barclay	182 (Note: Chart position is from 2016.)	4	—	96	FRA: 2× Platinum
Passé simple	Released: 29 October 2004; Label: Barclay	96	172 (Note: Chart position is from 2012.)	—	—	
Polnareff Best	Released: 21 May 2004; Label: Universal; Japan-only release	—	—	276	—	
Les 100 plus belles chansons	Released: 11 December 2006; Label: Universal Music; 5xCD box set	—	13	—	—	
Triple best of	Released: 16 November 2009; Label: Polydor	—	85	—	—	
Le cinéma de Polnareff	Released: 7 November 2011; Label: Universal Music/EmArcy	—	—	—	—	
Salut les copains	Released: 2014; Label: Polydor/Europe 1	—	—	—	—	
Double best of	Released: 14 April 2014; Label: Polydor	—	—	—	—	
Polnabest	Released: 2 December 2016; Label: Universal Music/Enough	108	34	—	—	
Pop rock en stock	Released: 8 December 2017; Label: Universal Music/Enough; 23xCD box set	109	—	—	—	
"—" denotes releases that did not chart or were not released in that territory.

== Singles and EPs ==
Title	Year	Peak chart positions									
Title	Year	FRA	BEL (FL)	BEL (WA)	GER	IT	JPN	NL	QUE	SPA	US
La poupée qui fait non	1966	2	2	1	15	—	—	2	1	3	—
Love Me Please Love Me	1966	1	7	1	21	7	80 (Note: Chart position is from 1971.)	—	6	—	—
"Una bambolina che fa no, no, no..." (Note: Italian-language version of "La poupée qui fait non".)	1966	—	—	—	—	14	—	—	—	—	—
"Meine Puppe sagt non" (Note: German-language version of "La poupée qui fait non".)	1966	—	—	—	38	—	—	—	—	—	—
"L'amour avec toi" (Note: Single from the EP Love Me Please Love Me)	1966	—	—	—	—	—	—	15	26	—	—
Sous quelle étoile suis-je né	1966	6	13	3	—	—	—	—	—	—	—
Ta-ta-ta-ta	1967	2	7	2	33	—	—	8	8	18	—
"You'll Be on My Mind"	1967	—	—	—	—	—	—	—	—	—	—
Âme câline	1967	4	—	8	—	—	—	—	—	—	—
Mes regrets	1967	—	—	13	—	—	—	—	—	—	—
Le bal des Laze	1968	7	—	14	—	—	—	—	—	—	—
"Encore un mois, encore un an" (Note: Released from the EP Le bal des Laze.)	1968	—	—	—	—	—	—	—	—	—	—
Jour après jour	1968	10	—	22	—	—	—	—	—	—	—
Pourquoi faut il se dire adieu	1968	—	—	16	—	—	—	—	—	—	—
"Ring-a-Ding" (Note: Single from the EP Pourquoi faut il se dire adieu)	1969	—	—	—	—	—	—	—	24	—	—
"Tous les bateaux tous les oiseaux"	1969	4	—	5	—	—	83 (Note: Chart position is from 1972.)	—	10	—	—
Rabelais	1969	—	—	—	—	—	—	—	—	—	—
"Un amore fa" (Note: Italian-language version of "Tous les bateaux tous les oiseaux")	1969	—	—	—	—	24	—	—	—	—	—
"La michetonneuse" / "Dans la maison vide"	1969	1	—	1	—	—	—	—	11 11	—	—
"Un train ce soir"	1970	29	—	21	—	—	—	—	9	—	—
"Gloria"	1970	2	—	7	—	—	33 (Note: Chart position is from 1973.)	—	—	—	—
"Qui a tué Grand-Maman"	1971	38	—	17	—	—	—	—	—	—	—
"Allô Georgina"	1971	13	25	5	—	—	—	—	—	—	—
"Tout, tout pour ma chérie"	1971	—	—	—	—	—	6	—	—	—	—
Ça n'arrive qu'aux autres	1971	7	—	19	—	—	71	—	3	—	—
"Holidays"	1972	4	—	5	—	—	6	—	—	—	—
"On ira tous au paradis"	1972	5	—	6	—	—	—	—	18	—	—
"Et hop on va tout changer"	1973	—	—	—	—	—	—	—	—	—	—
"Great Balls of Fire"	1973	—	—	—	—	—	55	—	—	—	—
"I Love You Because"	1973	12	—	24	—	—	27	—	—	—	—
"Tibili"	1974	27	—	31	—	—	40	—	—	—	—
"La vie, la vie ma quitte"	1974	—	—	—	—	—	87	—	—	—	—
"J'ai du chagrin Marie"	1974	—	—	—	—	—	76	—	—	—	—
"Holding On to Smoke"	1975	—	—	—	—	—	—	—	—	—	—
"Fame à la mode"	1975	34	—	22	—	—	—	—	—	—	—
"If You Only Believe (Jesus for Tonite)"	1976	—	—	—	—	—	—	—	—	—	48
"Lipstick"	1976	25	—	31	—	—	—	—	—	—	61
"Come On Lady Blue"	1976	—	—	—	—	—	—	—	—	—	—
"Lettre à France"	1977	2	—	6	—	—	—	—	33	—	—
"Une simple mélodie"	1978	21	—	—	—	—	—	—	29	—	—
"J'ai tellement de choses à dire"	1978	—	—	—	—	—	—	—	—	—	—
"Je t'aime"	1981	12	—	—	—	—	—	—	—	—	—
"Viens te faire chahuter"	1984	25	—	—	—	—	—	—	—	—	—
"La belle veut sa revanche"	1984	—	—	—	—	—	—	—	—	—	—
"Y'a que pas pouvoir qu'on peut"	1985	—	—	—	—	—	—	—	—	—	—
"Sur un seul mot de toi"	1986	—	—	—	—	—	—	—	—	—	—
"Good Bye Marylou"	1989	16	—	—	—	—	—	—	—	—	—
"Toi et moi..."	1990	45	—	—	—	—	—	—	—	—	—
"Kama-Sutra"	1990	47	—	—	—	—	—	—	—	—	—
"LNA HO"	1990	—	—	—	—	—	—	—	—	—	—
"Tout tout pour ma chérie" (live)	1996	—	—	—	—	—	—	—	—	—	—
"La poupée qui fait non" (live)	1996	—	—	—	—	—	—	—	—	—	—
"Je rêve d'un monde (When I'm in Love)"	1999	20	—	31	—	—	—	—	—	—	—
"Ophélie flagrant des lits"	2007	28	—	— (Note: Peaked at number 5 on the Wallonia Ultratip chart.)	—	—	—	—	—	—	—
"L'homme en rouge"	2015	74	—	43	—	—	—	—	—	—	—
"Grandis pas"	2018	—	—	— (Note: Peaked at number 22 on the Wallonia Ultratip chart.)	—	—	—	—	—	—	—
"—" denotes releases that did not chart or were not released in that territory.
