= Madly in Love (disambiguation) =

Madly in Love is a 1981 Italian romantic comedy film written and directed by Castellano & Pipolo.

Madly in Love may also refer to:

- Madly in Love (1943 film), French comedy film directed by Paul Mesnier
- "Madly in Love" (song), 1990 song by British pop band Bros
- Madly in Love, an alternative title for the Canadian romantic comedy film, Love Crazy (1991 film)

== See also ==
- Madly in Love at the End of the World, 2018 album by the Clarks
