= Elisabetta Viviani =

Italian singer and actress (born 1953)

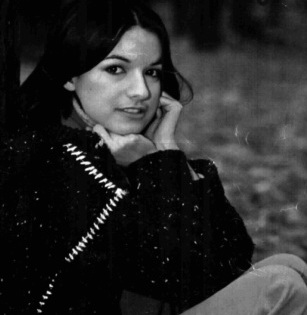

Background information
- Born: 4 October 1953 (age 72); Milan, Italy
- Genres: Popular music
- Occupations: Actor, singer, television personality, musician
- Instrument: Vocals
- Years active: 1974–present

Elisabetta Viviani (born 10 October 1953) is an Italian singer, actress, and TV personality.

== Biography ==
Born in Milan in 1953, she began her career in 1962 as a child, playing small roles in the Carosellos RAI and, from the age of seven, she attended Luciana Novaro's Milanese ballet school.

At the same time, she learned to play the guitar and enrolled at the Accademia dei Filodrammatici in Milan.

At that time, he began to lend her image to a few fortunate television commercials.

But 1978 is the year of success, thanks to the anime Heidi, of which she sings the soundtrack, and which sells a million and a half copies. The song, with lyrics by Franco Migliacci, music by Christian Bruhn and chorus by Baba Yaga, was the Italian theme of the famous Japanese anime, directed by Isao Takahata, to be broadcast on RAI.

The following year, 1979, Elisabetta plays La banda dei cinque, the band from the homonym crime program for boys.

In 1981, film producer Mario Cecchi Gori proposed her a role in the hit film Asso, alongside Adriano Celentano and Edwige Fenech.

In 1982 Elisabetta will sing, for the only time, at the Sanremo Festival with the song C'è, by Balducci, reaching the sixth position.

In 1990 she began her collaboration with Fininvest.

In 2015, with singer-songwriter Dario Baldan Bembo and actor Franco Romeo, she acted a recital about the life of pope Francis with music by Baldan Bembo and with text by Adriano Bonfanti and Gigi Reggi, entitled Il primo a chiamarsi Francesco.

In 2017 she released the album Le donne della mia età (Women of my age), which contains ten new songs written and produced by Claudio Damiani.

Elisabetta Viviani is also a painter.

== Personal life ==
On 1 September 1977 Elisabetta became mother of her daughter Nicole, had by Gianni Rivera. In February 2007 she became a volunteer ambulance rescuer for the White Cross of Milan and she certified in October 2008 at 118. The activity will continue for 10 years until Christmas 2018.

== Filmography ==
Films
Year	Title	Role	Notes
1981	Asso	Carolina, the waitress	
2014	Sexy shop	Onirica's manager	

== Discography ==
- 1995 – Semplicemente canzoni
- 2000 – Un tuffo nel mar Disney
- 2002 – Un film...una canzone
- 2004 – Le favole si possono cambiare
- 2006 – Un Natale di neve
- 2008 – Panta rei (tutto scorre)
- 2012 – Magico Natale
- 2013 – Favolando
- 2013 – Un Natale da favola
- 2015 – Il Natale dei bambini
- 2017 – Elisabetta Viviani per Donnein Quota
- 2017 – Le donne della mia età

== Television ==
- No, No, Nanette (Rai 1, 1974)
- La donna serpente (Rai 1, 1976, film TV)
- Il mostro turchino (Rai 1, 1976, film TV)
- Valentina, una ragazza che ha fretta, dir. Vito Molinari (Rai 1, 1977, film TV)
- La pulce nell'orecchio de Georges Feydeau, dir. Vito Molinari (Rai 1, 1983)
- La moglie ingenua e il marito malato dir. Achille Campanile (Rai 1, 1985)
- Passioni (Rai 1, 1989)
- In crociera (Rete 4, 1999)
