= Love Me, Please Love Me =

Love Me, Please Love Me may refer to:

- Love Me, Please Love Me (Michel Polnareff album), 1966, or the title track
- Love Me, Please Love Me (Sandie Shaw album), 1967, with the same title track
