= Ivan Cattaneo =

Italian artist, singer and songwriter (born 1953)

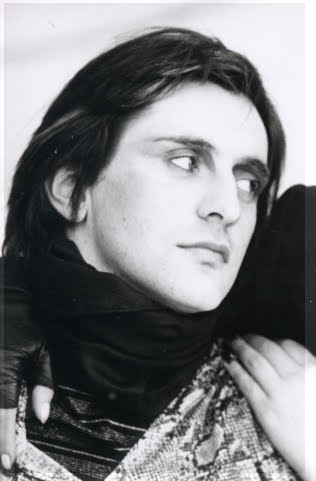
- Cattaneo in 1975

Background information
- Born: 18 March 1953 (age 73); Bergamo, Italy
- Genres: Pop, disco, electropunk, ska, electronic, drum and bass
- Occupations: Singer, songwriter, record producer, musician
- Years active: 1975 – present
- Labels: Ultima Spiaggia, PFM, Azzurra Music
- Website: ivancattaneo.it

Ivan Cattaneo (born 18 March 1953 in Bergamo, Italy) is an Italian artist, singer and songwriter. His music has been described as glam rock, disco, electropunk, ska, electronic rock. He is also an accomplished painter and multimedia artist.

== Music career ==
He spent his young years in Pianico, a small village in Bergamo next to Lake Iseo. At 12, he took part in Zecchino d'Oro, a musical competition for children, followed by Ariccia's "Festival degli sconosciuti" at 15. While attending art school he learned to play guitar, he studied music and began playing in some local blues groups and a massive fan of Frank Zappa and John Mayall.

After early release from military service for its flamboyant behavior, he met Nanni Ricordi, a music entrepreneur and was signed to the independent Italian record label Ultima Spiaggia, where he released his debut studio album UOAEI in 1975. In 1977, the follow-up album Primo secondo e frutta (Ivan compreso) ironic glam rock album had great reception and his first commercial success with single "Maria Batman". A master of promotional schemes, he launched a book putting forward what he called the TATTOUDITOVISTAOLFATTOGUSTO (TUVOG) theory, in a book carrying the title and attaching a free LP to it. He also collaborated with newcomer producer and arranger Roberto Colombo. Also a follower of the punk movement, he created the young character Anna Oxa during the 1978 Sanremo Music Festival. Soon followed collaboration with successful Italian punk bands like Revolver and Elektroshock. He also helped in launching of Down Mitchell, Patrizia Di Malta and Diana Est.

In 1979, he released his album Superivan in collaboration with Roberto Colombo and with Premiata Forneria Marconi (PFM) and in 1980, having left the indie label Ultima Spiaggia, he signed with the big label CGD and release of the album Urlo his most critically acclaimed studio album. The album also gave the huge single "Polisex", his definitive song, a staple song throughout the 1980s.

In 1981, he tries to revive 1960s music with a new twist. This work appeared in his 1981 album 2060 Italian Graffiati with songs like "Nessuno mi può giudicare" and "Una zebra a pois". He promoted the trend by appearing in the TV broadcast "Mr. Fantasy" where he became a regular guest. The album was a huge commercial success with reported sales of 475,000 copies. In 1982 he released the album Ivan il terribile with new songs he had written.

In this period, he opened the discothèque "Bandiera Gialla" (meaning the Yellow Flag) in Rimini in partnership with Caterina Caselli and Red Ronnie. Also in 1983, he released yet another album of covers, calling it Bandiera gialla like the name of his disco outlet. Revived songs included "Bang Bang", "Io ho in mente te", "Ho difeso il mio amore" and Italian version of Michel Polnareff classic "La Poupée qui fait non" in Italian as "La bambolina che fa no no", a song Polnareff had sung in Italian as well.

== New phase ==
Disappointed by the music industry and television, he withdrew from his musical career soon after, after finishing his contractual agreement with CGD record label with his 1986 album Vietato ai minori.

In 1987 he declared that he had become a vegetarian and following his retirement from the music scene, Cattaneo devoted himself to painting. He presented his first exhibition in 1989 entitled "100 Gioconde Haiku", touring with it in many Italy cities.

After six years with no musical releases, Cattaneo came back in 1992 with the album Il cuore è nudo...e i pesci cantano introducing New Age influences after having met the Indian guru Osho.

Starting 1994, he was involved in an ambitious art project called ZOOcietà DUEOOO that included music, dance, poetry and art entitled 'ZOOcietà DUEOOO', presented only in preview in February 2001, but remained a work in progress without seeing the light.

From 1995 onward, he alternated his career as musician and his new career as painter and multimedia artist. In 1996, he adopted the pseudonym "Cut Ivan" specially after his dance single Love is love.

In 1999, he acted in an avant-garde Italian-Polish cult film KK Kairos & Kronos about 1980s singers directed by Dario Maria Gulli, with players like Johnson Righeira, and Alessandra Di Sanzo. The film screened during the BresciaMusicArt event on 2 June 2000 becoming one of the finalists for the event. It was shown also at the New York Film Festival.

In 2002, he inaugurated his new art exhibition Se dico... seduco? in which the visual effects of the paintings are mixed with digital effects. In the same year he took part in the musical Joseph e la strabiliante tunica dei sogni (an Italian version of Joseph and the Amazing Dreamcoat). He also presented a radio program on Radio Kiss Kiss. In 2003, during Giuni Russo's return to the Sanremo Music Festival, Cattaneo produced two of her music videos for "Morirò d'amore" and "Una rosa è una rosa". And in 2004, he took part in the IRai 2 reality show Music Farm, replacing Scialpi. He returned for seasons 2 and 3. In 2007, he was also involved in the reality show "L'isola dei famosi".

In October 2005, he made a brief return to writing music after a 13 years of no album releases, with his new album Luna presente, with all 12 tracks composed by him, that included a remake of two revisited classics "Polisex" and "Crudele", produced by Roberto Cacciapaglia and Roy Tarrant. The album is dedicated to the moon and its 12 "metaphysical seas". With this album, Cattaneo reminisce his identity as a singer and used it as an opportunity to celebrate 30 years of artistic career.

On 13 March 2010, Ivan Cattaneo returned with his band "LiveMe" to perform at Duomo piazza in Milan, as a special guest of the event with Alberto Camerini. The event, hosted by Red Ronnie and promoted by the municipality of Milan, hosting a number of emerging bands and solo artists, offering a promotion of the new Italian music.

In April 2010 he released an album entitled 80 e basta! on an independent label called Azzurra Music. It was dedicated to a revival of 1980s music, including "Figli delle stelle" (Alan Sorrenti), "Ci stiamo sbagliando" (Luca Carboni), "Kobra" (Donatella Rettore), "Tomorrow" (Amanda Lear), "Tenax" (Diana Est), "I maschi" (Gianna Nannini) and "Amore disperato" (Nada) in addition to celebrated cover of "Una zebra a pois" (Mina), "Un ragazzo di strada" (I Corvi) and "Il geghegè" (Rita Pavone) plus a new recording of "Polisex".

In November 2010, he joined the cast of the musical Jesus Christ Superstar playing the role of Herod.

He wrote the song "Abbaio alla luna", recorded by Al Bano published by Azzurra Music on the occasion of Al Bano's return to Sanremo Music Festival.

In 2011, Warner Music Italy, in its popular series Original Album Series re-released a collection of 5 albums Ivan Cattaneo had done with Compagnia Generale del Disco (CGD) in a 5-CD box set (Urlo, 2060 Italian Graffiati, Ivan il terribile, Bandiera gialla and Vietato ai minori)

Cattaneo will be publishing a book, a collection of his aphorisms and slogans, and a finalisation of his multimedia project bringing together various artistic forms such as painting, music, videos and poetry.

In 2014 he acted in the film-comedy Sexy Shop.

In 2018 Cattaneo entered the italian television show Grande Fratello VIP, the italian adaptation of Celebrity Big Brother, as a celebrity housemate.

== Discography ==
=== Studio albums ===
- 1975: UOAEI (Ultima Spiaggia, ZLUS 55182)
- 1977: Primo secondo e frutta (Ivan compreso) (Ultima Spiaggia, ZPLS 34010)
- 1979: SuperIvan (Ultima Spiaggia, ZPLS 34069)
- 1980: Urlo (CGD, 20230)
- 1981: Duemila60 Italian Graffiati (CGD, 20254) (aka 2060 Italian Graffiati)
- 1982: Ivan il terribile (CGD, 20316)
- 1983: Bandiera gialla (CGD, 20350)
- 1986: Vietato ai minori (CGD, 20511)
- 1992: Il cuore è nudo...e i pesci cantano (Top Records / EMI)
- 2005: Luna presente (Recording Arts / Ducale)
- 2010: 80 e basta! (Azzurra Music)

=== Compilation albums ===
- 1983: Polisex (LP) (CGD series MusicA)
- 1996: Il meglio (DV More Records)
- 2000: Masterpiece (Warner / Fonit)
- 2001: I successi (CGD / Warner)
- 2004: Serie Flashback – I grandi successi originali (Remakes of 1970s classics) (Sony/BMG)
- 2006: Le più belle canzoni di Ivan Cattaneo (Series) (Warner Music)
- 2008: Una zebra a pois (Linea/Venus)
- 2011: Original Album Series: box 5 CD coi 5 album registrati negli anni '80 per la CGD (Rhino Records/Warner Music)

=== Singles ===
- 1975: "Darling" / "Pomodori da Marte" (Ultima spiaggia / RCA)
- 1976: "L'elefante è capovolto?" / "Farfalle" (Ultima spiaggia / RCA)
- 1977: "La segretaria ha colpito ancora" / "Maria-Batman" (Ultima spiaggia ZBS-7028 distributed by RCA Italiana)
- 1978: "Tabù" / "Agitare prima dell'uso!" (Ultima spiaggia / RCA)
- 1979: "Boys & boys" / "Su" (Ultima spiaggia / RCA)
- 1980: "Pupa" / "Polisex" (CGD)
- 1984: "Quando tramonta il sol" (CGD)
- 1985: "Dancin Number" / "To Be In Love With You" (with Dadavox) (CGD)
- 1986: "Neolatina Dancemix" / "La ragazza di Ipanema" / "Neolatina Disco Mix" (CGD)
- 1996: "Love is love (under the name Cut Ivan) (Trendy Factory Records / Zac Music)
- 2005: "L'aria – mare della serenità" (Recording Arts/ Ducale) (Promotional release)
- 2010: "Tenax" (Azzurra Music)

== Bibliography ==
- 1977: "T.U.V.O.G. ART" (Moizzi Editore)
