= Emergency medical services in Italy =

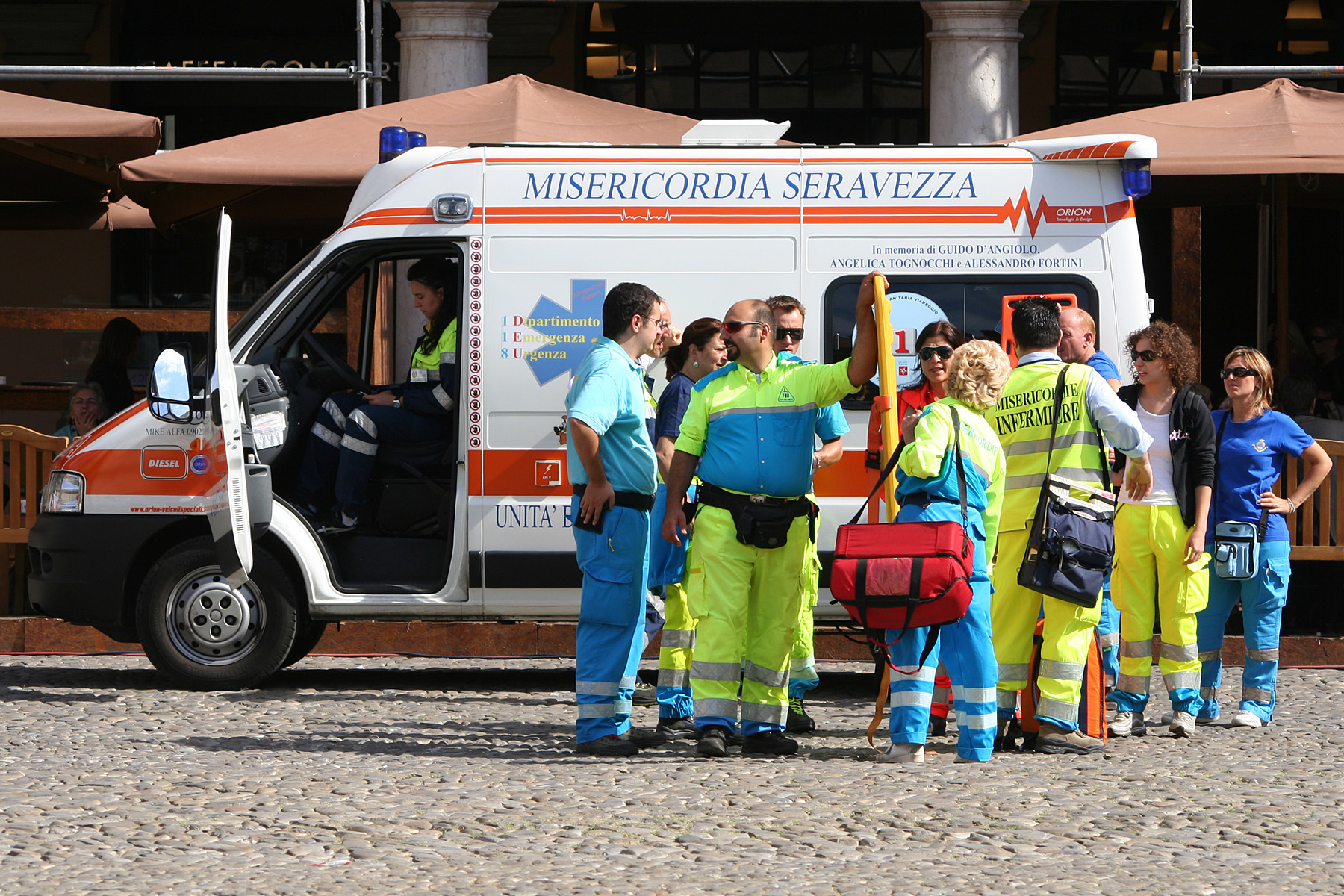
An ambulance and its crew in Modena, Italy

Emergency medical services in Italy currently consist primarily of a combination of volunteer organizations providing ambulance service, supplemented by physicians and nurses who perform all advanced life support (ALS) procedures. The emergency telephone number for emergency medical service in Italy is 118. Since 2017 it has also been possible to call by the European emergency number 112, although this is a general police/fire/medical number.

== Organization ==
Emergency medical services are under Public Health Authorities control in each Italian Region; the ambulance subsystem is provided by a variety of different sources.

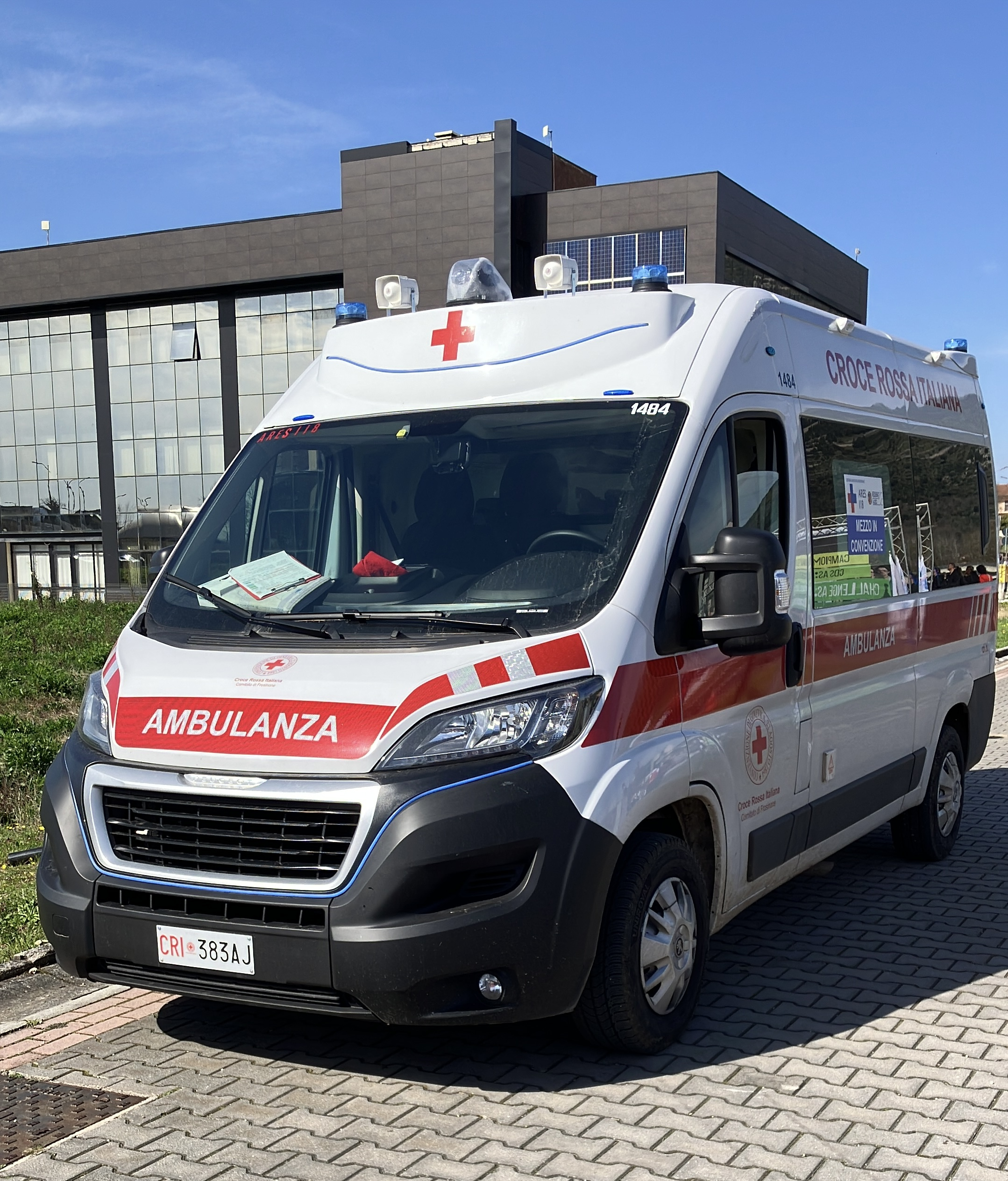
An Italian Red Cross Ambulance

The method of delivery can vary considerably from one location to another. In some locations, responsibility for the provision of EMS has been undertaken by the local hospital, while in others, services may be provided by a range of volunteer organizations, such as the Italian Red Cross (Croce Rossa Italiana), ANPAS (National Association for Public Assistance), Confraternite di Misericordia, or by private companies.

Some organizations, such as hospitals, often provide a single type of service, such as neonatal, while leaving others to provide the balance of services. How the service is actually provided, and the level of service that is provided, can vary from a region to another, although basic standards are quite the same. Emergency service in Italy is always free of charge. Air ambulance services are normally provided by the same regional authorities with a network of dedicated helicopters, or as an added service from a number of other government agencies, including the Italian Coast Guard, Civil Defence, and the Vigili del Fuoco (firefighters). Air ambulance is used to transport urgent cases - such as stroke victims- from their homes or from peripheric healthcare units to central regional hospitals, which are specialised centres of excellence for a given pathology.

Most of times, the Pronto Soccorso have their own diagnostic radiology unit (with TAC, PET, ecc.), which is independently managed and separate from the public hospital. In 2025 they received new second-generation diagnostic machineries and equipments, financed by the European Union through the National Recovery and Resilience Plan_{it}.

== Standards ==
=== Staffing ===
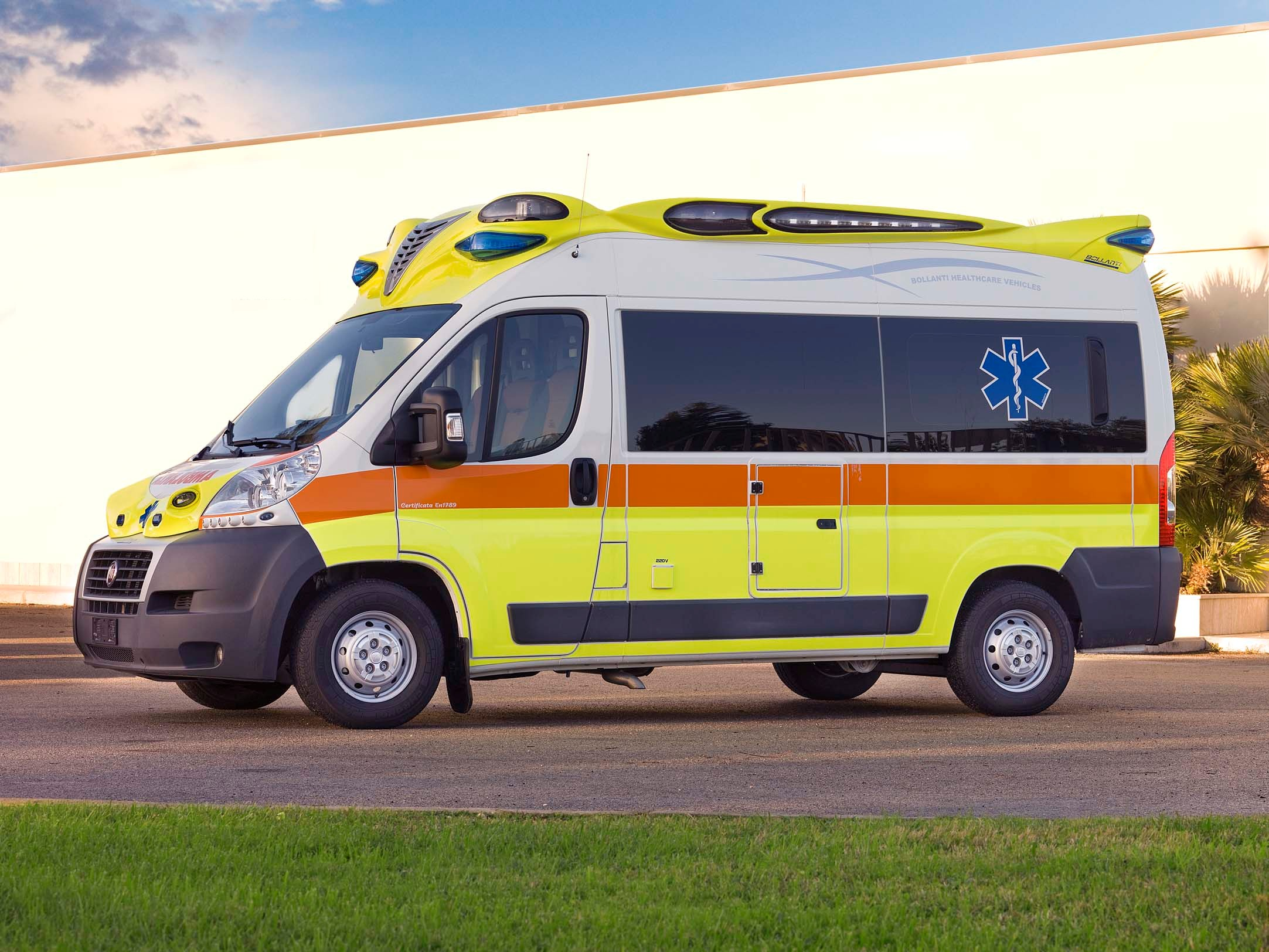
Italian ambulance

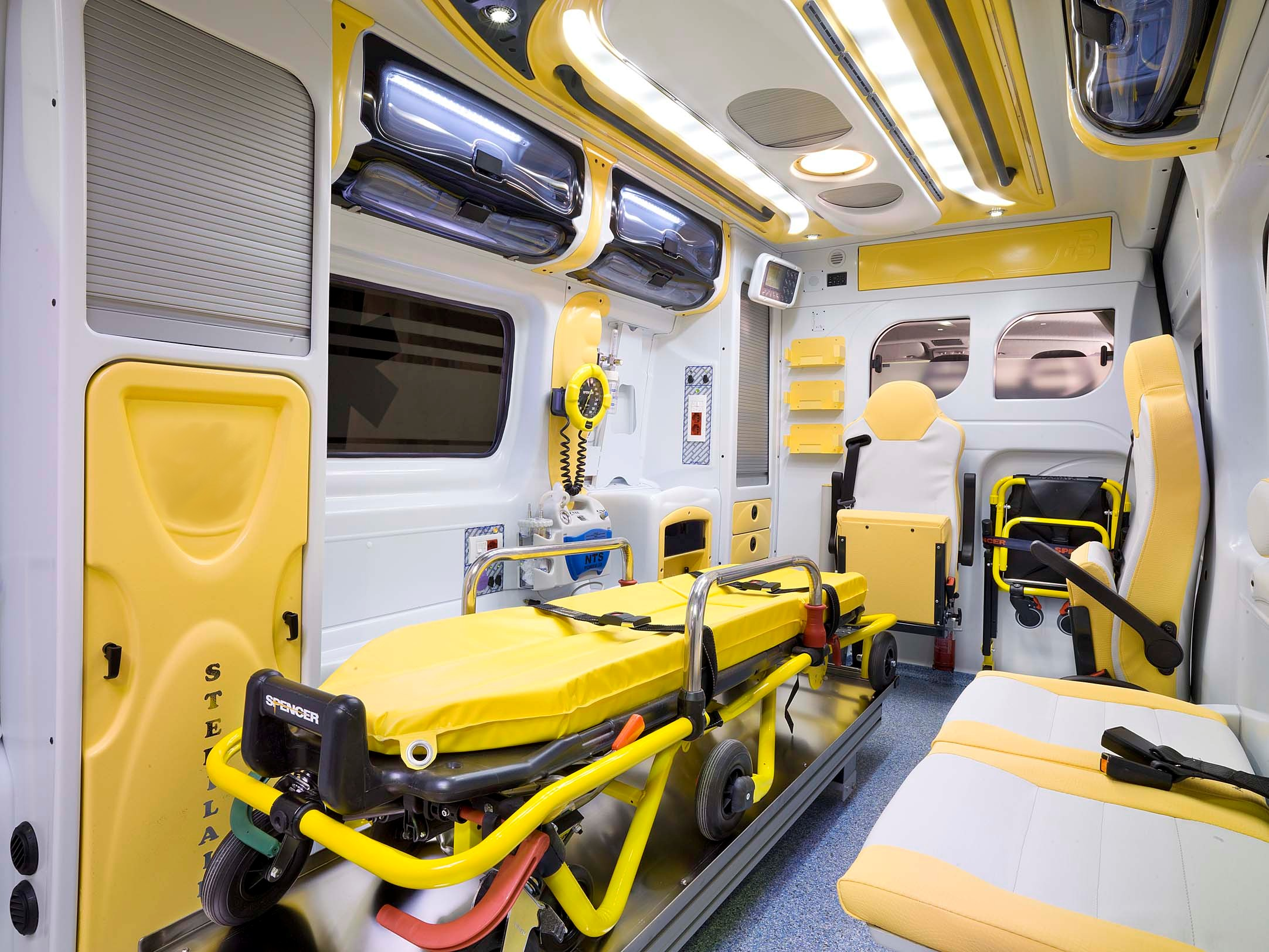
Typical interior view

How ambulances are staffed is determined to some extent by the location, and by the resources available to the community. For the most part, Italy follows the Franco-German (as opposed to Anglo-American) model of EMS service delivery. The basic model consists of Basic Life Support ambulances, Advanced Life Support ambulances, Modified Advanced Life Support ambulances, and physician response cars called automedica. BLS units are typically volunteer-based, and crews consist of a minimum of two EMTs called soccorritore (one of them is a dedicated driver); it is not uncommon to find three- or four-EMTs ambulance crews.

ALS units are more likely to be based in large centers, are more likely to be staffed by paid, hospital-based personnel, and are commonly composed of a physician (usually an emergency physician or anesthetist) and a critical care nurse. ALS units can be found either on emergency response vehicles (automedica) or on intensive care ambulances. Some areas use a modified approach to ALS, with a volunteer crew supplemented by an emergency nurse who is permitted to perform some ALS procedures.

The top end of the spectrum are the air ambulances, staffed by the same personnel of ground ALS units (physician and nurse) and by a mountain rescue specialist or another critical care nurse.

Operation centres choose each time the most adequate vehicle to send on the basis of the seriousness of a patient's conditions.

=== Training ===
There is a great deal of variation in the training of EMS personnel in Italy like in many countries, where no distinction is made between volunteers and paid EMTs. Non-emergency services (such non-critical patient transports) use purely volunteers, who are required to have 20 or 40 hours of BLS training; all EMTs must have 120 hours of training, attending an additional 80- or 100-hour course. Italian EMTs are able to provide non-invasive prehospital care, including PBLS, PTLS and automated external defibrillation. In few regions EMTs are also trained to assist nurses or physician with endotracheal intubation, to establish venous access, to aspirate drugs and to execute a 12 lead ECG, which will be transmitted to the hospital or to the 118-operations room, where a cardiologist can examine it before the arrival of the patient. That being said, many Italian volunteers take their commitment very seriously, and participate in many hours of uncompensated training; this is particularly true for well-organized volunteer groups. These individuals still require support from a physician and nurse for ALS provision. While there are some ALS ambulances in Italy, they are typically not found outside larger centers, and in many cases, where they do exist, they are frequently required to have the 'emergency' physician present to perform ICU skills, in a manner very similar to the other neighbouring countries.

Nurses are required to have a critical care background; physicians are typically specialists in some field of medical specialty, often internists, surgeons or anaesthetists, although this background is not strictly required (though in some regione anaesthetists are the only physicians on ambulances or fly-cars). Emergency medicine is only now becoming slowly recognized as a medical specialty inside the hospital in Italy, and there are no real plans to create a subspecialty for pre-hospital care. Poor compensation and hours of work have reportedly resulted in a relatively high turnover rate among physicians in the system.

=== Vehicles ===
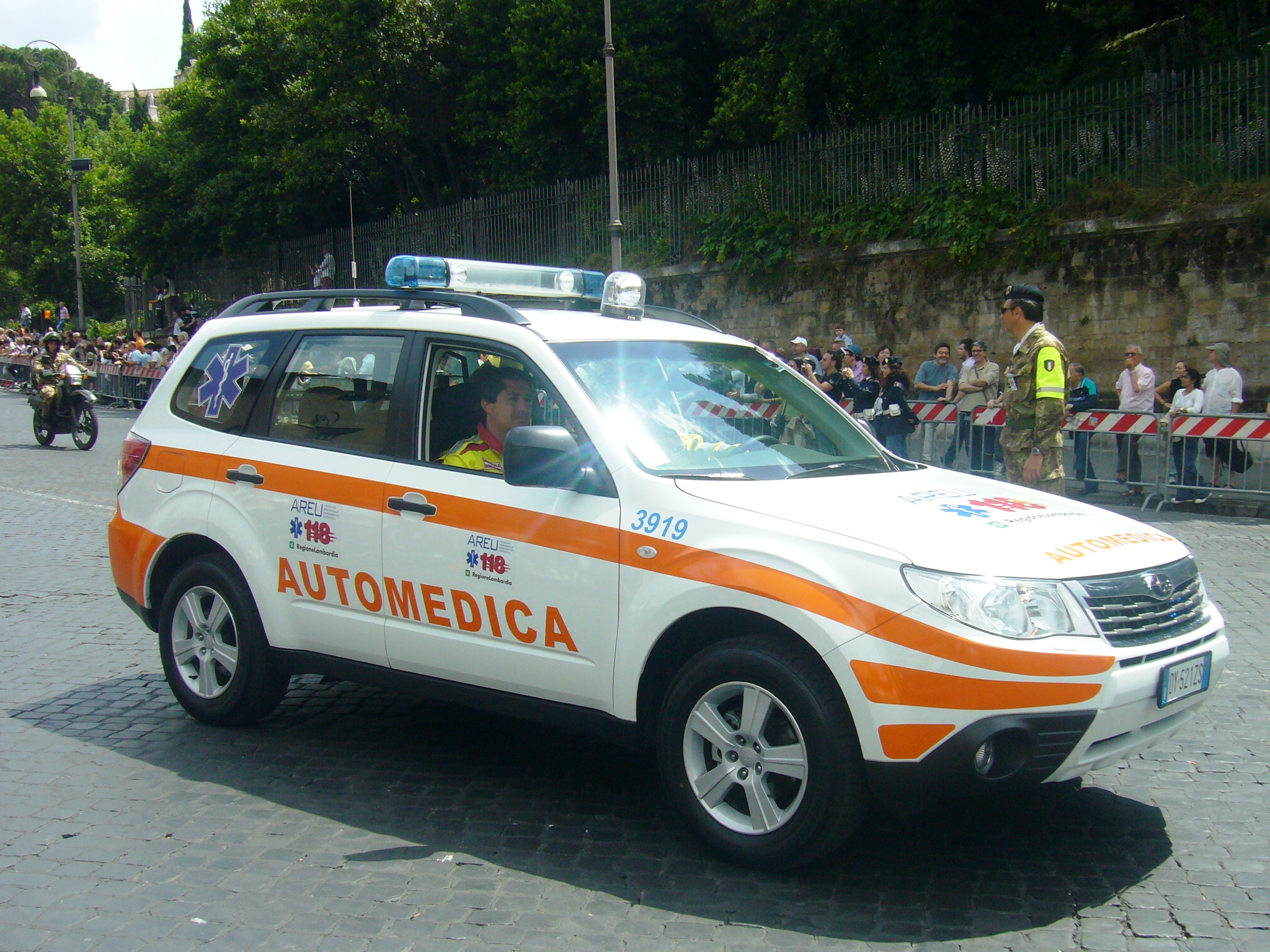
Physician- and nurse-led fly-car

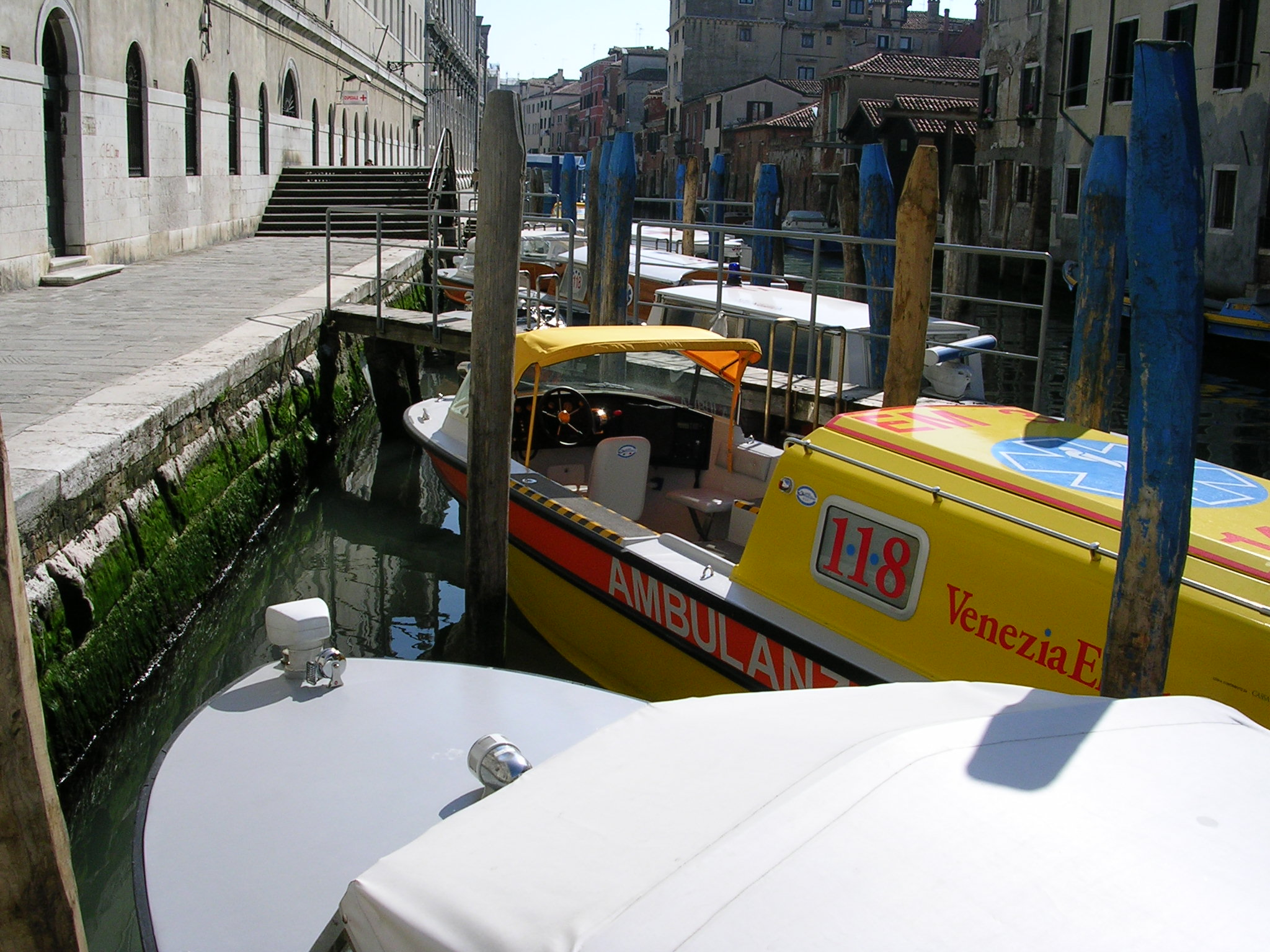
Water ambulance in Venice

Vehicles used as ambulances in Italy comply with most aspects of the European standard for ambulances, CEN 1789, as issued by the European Committee for Standardization. The visual identity provisions of the standard are not yet being followed.

Ambulances are usually white-painted and display an orange reflective stripe all around the vehicle, in addition to a star of life on each side and the word AMBULANZA (Ambulance) reversed on the front. Each emergency ambulance has also to display the emergency number 118 and the name and logo of the organization providing the service. The use of lights and sirens is authorized by the operation centre and dispatch room at the beginning of the response. Only blue flashing lights are permitted by law.

Italian Red Cross ambulances (identifiable also by special vehicle registration plates with the acronym CRI) are authorized to display a red stripe and a red cross instead of the orange stripe and the star of life.

Physician emergency response vehicle have the same graphic elements of ambulances except for the front word AUTOMEDICA or SOCCORSO SANITARIO ("Medical Emergency [Service]"). This last term has recently been used in some regions because some of the ALS vehicles are staffed by a physician and a nurse, while other vehicles are staffed with two nurses ("Automedica" literally means "Physician car", so it would be a misguiding name for nurse-only staffed units).

=== Dispatch and regulation ===
The entire system is coordinated and regulated by the SUEM 118 operations and dispatch rooms within an Integrated Public Health System organization and a Physician Regulated emergency call center. It usually operates in each of Italy's governmental Province and provides centralized regulation/dispatch, standards and guidelines for operation.

Dispatchers answer to emergency calls and choose the nearest and best-indicated emergency care mobile resource; medical training for dispatchers is in some region provided.

=== Response time of Emergency Ambulances ===
Italy currently has an ambulance response time standard for urban areas of eight minutes or less for life-threatening emergencies. Like in other countries this standard is not currently being always met since there is a great disparity in geography and healthcare efficiency, depending on which region is being analyzed. Therefore, the law establishes a maximum response time of twenty minutes for extra-urban areas, such as isolated places. In order to do so, ambulance and emergency stations, with paid crews or volunteers, must be located at least in a minimum range of 5 km.

=== Waiting time of the Emergency Rooms ===
According to Agenas data from 2023, average waiting times are very high. The average waiting time in the Emergency Room (called Pronto Soccorso, located in each public hospital) for a white code is 164 minutes, while for a green code it is 229 minutes. 60% of the around 19 millions codes processed by Italian Emergency Rooms in 2023 were white or green.

The queues are therefore mainly due to the absence of local structures and community medicine services capable of quickly and free of charge managing non-emergency situations that end up in the Emergency Rooms.

=== Private security guards ===
Since 2019, Italian public hospitals have assigned their private security guards not only to the surveillance and safekeeping of buildings, but also to the protection of safety and security of healthcare workers, nurses and medical staff on whom they do not, however, depend hierarchically. This has occurred due to an increase in assaults on staff on duty in hospitals.

== See also ==
- Health in Italy
- Emergency medical services
- Italian Red Cross
