= Obesity in Italy =

- Other names: Overweight epidemic in Italy
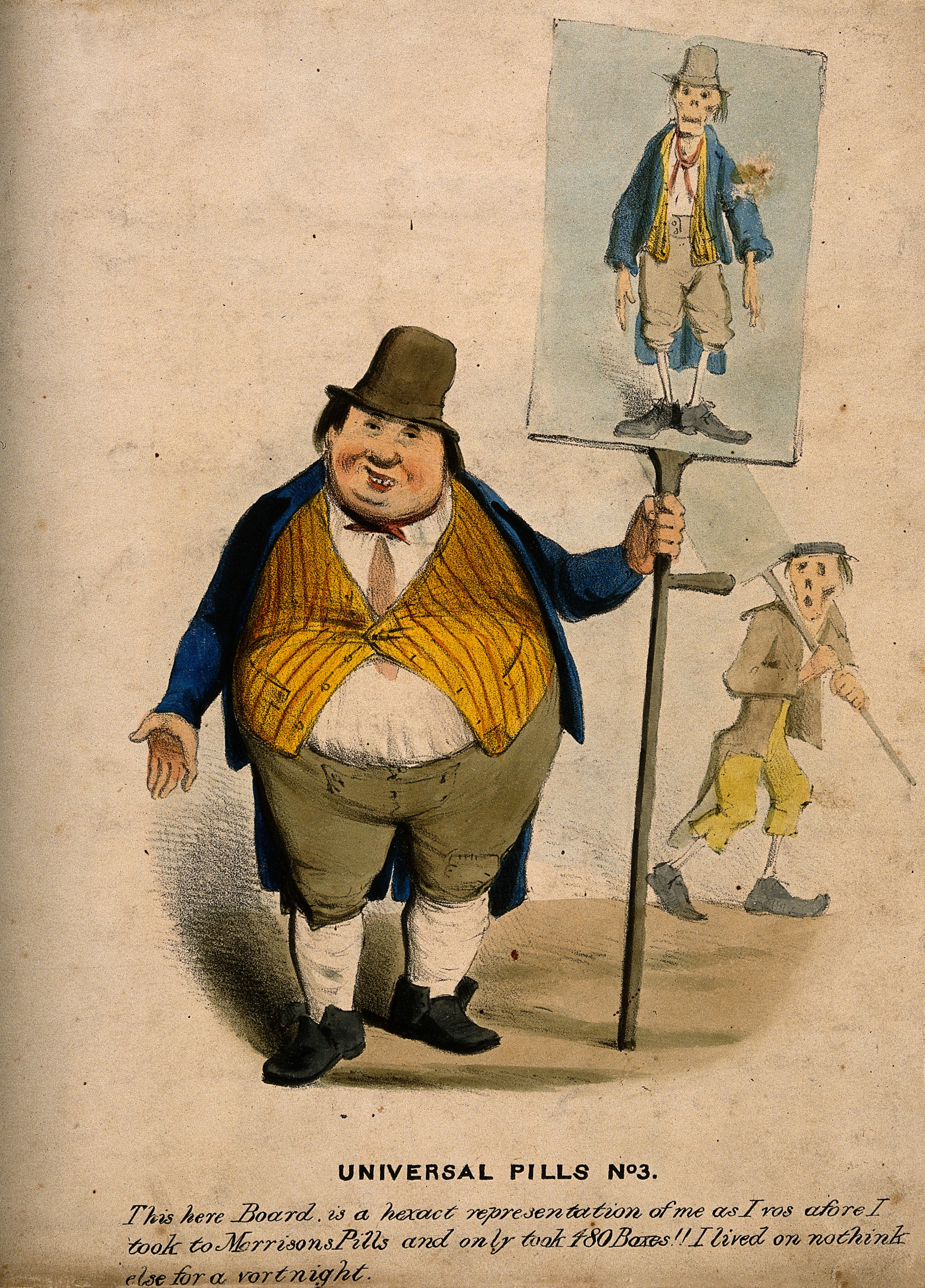
- Location of Italy
- Specialty: Endocrinology, Public Health
- Complications: Diabetes, cardiovascular diseases, joint problems
- Usual onset: Increasing in both adults and children
- Duration: Chronic condition
- Prevention: Mediterranean diet promotion, physical activity initiatives
- Treatment: Dietary interventions, exercise programs, healthcare support
- Prevalence: ~10% (estimated adult obesity rate in 2025)

The increase in obesity rates in recent years has become more and more a global health problem. Italy, which is known for its healthy Mediterranean diet, is equally at home with this problem. In Italy, the growing epidemic can be a serious threat to national health, with variations in different regions. Overweight rates are significantly higher in the south than in the north. Obesity has an impact on Italians' health, government finances, and personal assets. And unhealthy diets, lack of physical activity and sedentariness, and socioeconomic disparities contribute to rising obesity rates, especially among children and adolescents. Recent data trends indicate a growing problem of overweight among Italian children. Italy's efforts to address obesity include initiatives such as public policy interventions and the development of a healthcare system.

== The current situation of obesity in Italy ==
The increase in obesity rates has become a major global health issue in recent years, and Italy, which is known for its healthy Mediterranean diet, is no different on this issue.

Although Italy has one of the lowest adult obesity rates among OECD countries, it has one of the highest childhood obesity rates in Europe. According to survey data from the World Health Organization (WHO) from 2015 to 2017, 21% of children in Italy are overweight or obese, which is the highest rate of childhood obesity in Europe. In turn, 35.5% of Italian adults are overweight, with more than one in ten of them obese, and 45.9% of the population aged 18 and over are overweight. According to research projections by Vincenzo Atella, a professor at the University of Rome's School of Economics, the obesity rate in Italy in 2030 could be double the number in 2000.

It is worth noting that there are also differences in the different regions of Italy. The impact of obesity on health-related quality of life is particularly pronounced in the Southern regions.

Disparities in rates between genders and age groups are also evident. Obesity rates are significantly higher in Italian men than in women, while the highest percentage of overweight is in the older age group of 65-74 years.

== Criteria of Obesity ==
Overweight and obesity are abnormal or excessive fat accumulation that poses a risk to health. Although there are many ways to screen for obesity, the most widely used method is the Body Mass Index (BMI). BMI is calculated by dividing weight in kilograms by height in meters squared. According to WHO, for adults, a pre-obesity body mass index (BMI) value above 25 is considered overweight and above 30 is considered obese.

== Prevalence of obesity in Italy ==
In Italy, almost half of men and about one third of women are overweight or obese. Between 2001 and 2008, the age-standardised prevalence of overweight (obesity) rose by 1.4% (1.9 %) in men and by 0.4 % (0.5%) in women. Research from 2023 report that 70% of men and 55% of women in Italy are still overweight or obese. The prevalence of obesity in Italy is 23 % for men and 25% for women. The prevalence of overweight is 47% and 30%, respectively. The prevalence of obesity is significantly higher among those with primary or secondary education than among those with higher education. This information shows that the prevalence of obesity and overweight in the adult population is still at epidemic levels in Italy.

== Causes of obesity in Italy ==
=== Social factors ===
The role of socio-demographic characteristics, such as age, gender, education, eating habits, geographical distribution, etc., can have an impact.

In Italy, obesity is more prevalent among socially disadvantaged groups, who have a lower level of education and therefore have greater difficulty in accessing medical assistance. It can lead to an overweight situation that is not well controlled.

Eating habits are also a factor. Italians who regularly consume fruits and vegetables, for example, have a significantly lower rate of overweight than those who regularly drink alcohol and consume junk food. Obese people seem to get more pleasure from shopping and are more interested in cooking. And they are more likely to find self-satisfaction in food. However, they were less interested in the nutritional content of their food. Research show that obese people prefer snacks to regular meals.

==== Urbanisation and sedentary lifestyles ====
The economic development and urbanisation of Italy has led to an increase in the number of sedentary occupations and a consequent decrease in daily physical activity, and this economicisation is also quietly changing the shape of the Italian population. As more and more people start working in office jobs, there are fewer opportunities for movement and exercise than in traditional labor-intensive occupations. The expansion of car-centred infrastructure in cities has also replaced streets that were once travelled by foot and bicycle, all of which can lead to weight gain. At the same time, long working hours and lack of time to prepare food can encourage moves to consume fast food and ready meals, further fueling the risk of obesity.

==== Marketing and Food Industry Impacts ====
The food industry's aggressive promotion of high calorie processed foods, especially targeting children, is a major contributor to rising obesity rates in Italy. Brightly colored advertisements for snacks are everywhere, cartoon images looped on TV endorse high-sugar drinks, and internet celebrities on social media are promoting the latest models of processed foods. The lack of strict regulation of unhealthy food advertising has allowed companies to influence consumer behaviour on a wide scale. Fast food and ultra-processed foods are reshaping Italian taste preferences and healthier foods are on the decline. This is particularly worrying for children, who are extremely vulnerable to marketing strategies that are likely to influence their eating habits for the rest of their lives.

=== Economic factors ===
==== Food Prices and Accessibility in Italy ====
Although Italy is known for its Mediterranean diet, economic constraints often force low-income groups to choose cheaper, processed foods that are high in calories but lacking in essential nutrients. The prohibitive price tag of fresh fruits and vegetables compared to the low price of processed foods makes it financially difficult for many to achieve a healthy diet. In addition, this phenomenon shows a marked difference between urban and rural areas, with residents of large cities still having easy access to fresh food markets, while in remote areas and low-income neighborhoods there is greater reliance on pre-packaged or fast food.

==== Income disparities and socio-economic status ====
In Italy, there is a worrying correlation between low-income levels and high obesity rates. Economic pressures reshape the eating habits of Italians. Financial income difficulties can limit access to the luxuries of nutrient-rich foods, fitness facilities and preventative healthcare, which can lead to poorer health outcomes. At the same time low-income families are more likely to buy cheap, high-calorie foods because healthier choices require a higher monetary investment and opting for affordable but quick-filling fast food becomes a better decision. In addition, education gaps limit awareness of nutritional choices, and a lack of nutritional knowledge compounds the problem. This reinforces the vicious circle of 'the poorer you are, the fatter you get' for economically disadvantaged families.

=== Factors of childhood obesity in Italy ===
Unhealthy diets, lack of physical activity and sedentary behaviour are contributing to higher rates of childhood obesity in Italy. A quarter of Italian children from the 2019 study drank sugary drinks at least once a day but ate fruit and vegetables less frequently. Nearly half of Italian children in school sit for more than two hours a day and are less physically active. Secondly, Italy has the highest percentage of children who spend at least two hours a day on weekdays and weekends watching TV or using electronic devices compared to other countries. These are the causes of overweight.

In addition to this, geographical differences also bring about differences in obesity rates. Research by Angela Spinelli, an epidemiologist at the National Centre for Disease Prevention and Health Promotion, says that in the south of Italy, people have chosen to move away from the traditional Mediterranean diet over time, opting for unhealthy foods. They make unhealthy choices and drink sugary drinks at least once a day. There was also an increase in the availability of non-Mediterranean food groups (animal fats, vegetable oils, sugar and meat) and an increase in the intake of unhealthy foods such as salty snacks and sugary drinks. According to research, 24 per cent of Italian children aged 8-9 years do not consume fruits and vegetables on a daily basis, and surveys also show that 9.4 per cent of children consume salty snacks at least four days a week, and 2.9 per cent every day, while the main intake of children is sweets, which are consumed at least four days a week by 48.4 per cent and every day by 19.9 per cent of children. Italian children living in the north, on the other hand, are more inclined to consume more traditional foods, such as fish or cereals, yoghurt and cheese for breakfast. This leads to significantly higher obesity rates in southern Italy than in the north.

== Effects of obesity in Italy ==
The epidemic of obesity rates can have an impact on the health of people in Italy, and it can trigger non-communicable diseases such as diabetes, heart disease, different kinds of cancers, and so on.

Not only that, but it will also put pressure on the resources of an ageing population.

On the financial side, there are sustainability implications for Italy's national healthcare system. Obesity leads to an increase in chronic diseases, such as chronic renal failure, sleep apnea, which can lead to an increase in expenditures (mainly in terms of drug prescriptions), thus becoming a major driver of healthcare costs.

From research, it has been shown that both overweight and obesity are associated with an increased prevalence of a number of chronic diseases, including cardiovascular disease, chronic kidney disease, osteoarthritis, depression, and sleep apnea. At all ages, costs associated with medications and outpatient services (visits and diagnostic procedures) increase significantly with increasing BMI. From a bulletin health perspective, the highest cost increases are for younger patients, who, if of normal weight, can avoid medications and save on healthcare costs and expenditures. However, with age, being overweight or obese for patients also means longer treatment times, higher chances of future comorbidities and health problems, and more frequent access to health care. A study on the cost of disease shows that in 2020, obesity-related healthcare expenditure in Italy will reach 13.34 billion euros, with cardiovascular disease, diabetes and cancer being the most costly diseases. Higher BMI levels lead to increased spending on drug prescriptions, diagnostic tests and specialist visits, further exacerbating financial pressures.

Obesity also imposes increased direct and indirect economic costs on Italians, which include the direct costs of medication, hospitalization, monitoring and adverse events. Examples include the cost of bariatric surgery, and the treatment of diseases associated with obesity. According to a survey conducted by the Italian Centre for Applied Economic Research in Healthcare (CEAH), the cardiovascular diseases that account for the largest share of the total costs are 49.9%, which is about 6.66 billion euros. Bariatric surgery, on the other hand, contains the smallest cost at €240 million. Hypertension and diabetes cost €840 million and €650 million respectively. This means that obese patients with these two diseases bring more costs.

Indirect costs are reduced absenteeism and attendance due to obesity. The cost of lost productivity due to obesity illness ranges from $89 to $1,586 for absenteeism and from $11 to $4,175 for attendance.

Individually, obese Italian adults who do not receive adequate support use more prescription drugs and in this case stay in hospital longer, while they need more specialized outpatients care, resulting in significantly higher costs than Italian adults of normal weight.

== Tackling Obesity ==
From 2000s to now, Italy has adopted policies and programs that have implemented many strategies to tackle the problem of obesity. Although there are significant differences between regions, all Italian regions have implemented at least one obesity-controlling intervention.

Reports through the World Health Organization show that Italy, on the part of the government, has established many national testing systems for adults and children. Italy has implemented national health policies and prevention programmes to address adult and childhood obesity. According to the report on Italian policies, interventions and actions published by WHO, the National Prevention Plan 2020–2025, Italy includes screening strategies for nutritional health, obesity prevention and public health for different age groups.

=== Guidelines for healthy eating ===
In 2018, the Centre for Food and Nutrition Research published a revised version of the Linee guida per una sana alimentazione (Healthy Eating Guidelines), the Italian nutritional guidelines for healthy eating.

Meanwhile the EU has approved the use of new battery labelling in Italy based on 'whole foods' rather than food ingredients, and is currently coordinating with the protocol to achieve full integration by 2022.Practical and patient-centred guidelines for the management of adult obesity in primary care in Europe were published in 2019.

This article provides tailored guidance for GPs on obesity management to support a practical patient-centred approach. It includes communication and motivational interviewing for GPs.

The Italian National Institute of Health, in collaboration with universities and the Ministry of Research, developed the public health surveillance system "OKkio alla Salute" (Concern for Health).

Local authorities in Italy have developed the Health Progress System (Sorveglianza PASSI - Progessi delle Aziende Sanitarie per la Salute in Italia). to provide information on health services, including people's perception of health and including risk information on obesity, to people aged 18 to 69.

For people over 64 years of age, Italy has developed a system for monitoring their health and quality of life: the "PASSI Silver" system (PASSI d'Argento).

Italy started the "Heart" project (Progetto CUORE) to study cardiovascular risk factors and obesity in the population, through regular standardized, rigorous and accurate medical examinations.

The State has started the program "Get Healthy" (Guadagnare Salute), promoted by the National Center for Disease Prevention and Control (CCM), whose main objective is the proactive prevention of obesity through the promotion of healthy lifestyles and screening. Since 2004, specific health prevention projects have been carried out in a number of areas related to obesity, including: environment and climate, chronic diseases, promotion of healthy lifestyles, support for vulnerable groups and information.

Responsibility for the development of health care policies and their implementation is shared between central and local governments. In Italy's quasi-federal arrangement, the Ministry of Health is responsible for setting the main policy directions, while the regions are responsible for developing their own regional policies and organizing effective local interventions and regional public health services.

However, as Italy's targeting of budget cuts may undermine progress in building these systems, it will result in fewer resources to combat obesity.

Secondly there are huge differences in the response between Italian regions. The Ministry of Health and the CCM allocate millions of euros each year to obesity prevention programs, but geographic inequalities can lead to differences in resources and quality of services. This shows that the Italian healthcare system still needs to be improved, and interventions need to be tailored to each region. The data suggests that the government needs to focus on childhood obesity rates in Italy and focus on obesity prevention and health education from an early age.

== See also ==
- Health in Italy
- Epidemiology of obesity
