= Commissario Laurenti =

- Starring: Henry Hübchen; Barbara Rudnik
- Country of origin: Germany
- No. of episodes: 5

Production
- Production location: Trieste
- Running time: 85–93 minutes

Original release
- Network: ARD
- Release: 2006 – 2009

Commissario Laurenti is a German television series, with five episodes broadcast 2006–2009, based on the crime novels by Veit Heinichen. It was filmed on location in Trieste, Italy.

The episodes are:

- Gib jedem seinen eigenen Tod (2006)
- Die Toten vom Karst (2006)
- Tod auf der Warteliste (2007)
- Der Tod wirft lange Schatten (2008)
- Totentanz (2009)

== Series Cast ==
- Henry Hübchen as Commissario Proteo Laurenti appears in 5 episodes, 2006-2009
- Barbara Rudnik as Laura Laurenti appears in 5 episodes, 2006-2009
- Sergej Moya as Marco Laurenti appears in 5 episodes, 2006-2009
- Florian Panzner as Antonio Sgubin appears in 5 episodes, 2006-2009
- Sophia Thomalla as Livia Laurenti appears in 5 episodes, 2006-2009
- Catherine Flemming as Marietta appears in 5 episodes, 2006-2009
- Rolf Hoppe as Galvano appears in 3 episodes, 2007-2009
- Johannes Silberschneider as Scoglio appears in 3 episodes, 2007-2009
- Christopher Buchholz as Drakic appears in 3 episodes, 2007-2009
- Horst Krause as Questore appears in 2 episodes, 2007-2008
- Carolina Vera as Dr. Ziva Ravno appears in 2 episodes, 2006-2009
- August Schmölzer as Orlando appears in 2 episodes, 2006

== See also ==
- List of German television series
