= Polnareff's =

Studio album by Michel Polnareff
- Released: 1971
- Recorded: 1971
- Genre: Rock
- Label: Disc'AZ

Michel Polnareff chronology
Le Bal des Laze (1968)	Polnareff's (1971)	Fame à la Mode (1975)

Polnareff's is an album by Michel Polnareff released in 1971 on Disc'AZ. At the time of its release, Polnareff was "one of the most successful musicians in France", according to The Independent. The album reflected some very personal and serious issues for Polnareff, including the suicide of Europe 1 radio director Lucien Morisse, a close friend, to whom the song "Qui a tué grand'maman?" was dedicated. The album was remixed in quadraphonic for release in Japan in 1972. In 1997, the album was first reissued on compact disc by Universal Records, along with his albums Le Bal des Lazes and Love Me, Please Love Me.

== Track list ==
1. "Voyages" (M. Polnareff) – 2:52
2. "Né dans un ice-cream" (J.-L. Dabadie, M. Polnareff) – 3:22
3. "Petite, petite" (J.-L. Dabadie, M. Polnareff) – 3:20
4. "Computer's Dream" (M. Polnareff) – 4:16
5. "Le désert n'est plus en Afrique" (M. Polnareff, M. Polnareff) – 3:04
6. "Nos mots d'amour" (J.-L. Dabadie, M. Polnareff) – 3:13
7. "...Mais encore" (M. Polnareff) – 2:15
8. "Qui a tué grand'maman ?" (M. Polnareff, M. Polnareff) – 2:37
9. "Monsieur l'Abbé" (M. Polnareff, M. Polnareff) – 3:30
10. "Hey You Woman" (P. Delanoe, M. Polnareff) – 5:21
11. "À minuit, à midi" (J.-L. Dabadie, M. Polnareff) – 3:36

== Reception ==
Professional ratings
Review scores
Source	Rating
AllMusic	4.5/5 stars

Thom Jurek of AllMusic described the album as a "psychedelic pop masterpiece", "so bloody well-executed and produced, it cannot be anything but brilliant ... pretentious French psychedelic soul at its most garish and essential."

== Personnel ==
- Michel Polnareff Piano, keyboards, vocals, mellotron, organ, electric piano, guitar, xylophone, bass, arranger, orchestra director vocals, compositions
- Jimmy Page: Electric Guitars
- Herbie Flowers: Bass
- Brian Bennett: Drums
- Jim Lawless: Percussion
- Anthony King & Bill Shepherd: strings arrangements & Orchestra directors

=== Technical ===
- Jean-Loup Dabadie – text
- Pierre Delanoé – text
- Peter Gallen – assistant
- Paul Holland – sound recording
- Anthony King – arranger, orchestra director
- Barry Kingston – collaboration
- Jean- Marie Perier – photography
- François Plassat – illustrations

Recorded in Abbey Road Studios, London 1971

== Releases ==
Region	Date	Label	Format	Catalog
France	1971	AZ Disques	stereo LP	STEC 81
Japan	1972	Epic Records Japan	SQ quadraphonic LP	ECPL-3
	1997	Universal Records	CD	
	2003	Universal	CD	9809172
	2003	Semi-Meridian	CD	7841552
	2006	Umvd Import	CD	784155
