= Asso (film) =

- Italian theatrical release poster by Renato Casaro
- Directed by: Castellano & Pipolo
- Written by: Castellano & Pipolo
- Produced by: Mario Cecchi Gori; Vittorio Cecchi Gori
- Starring: Adriano Celentano; Edwige Fenech
- Cinematography: Danilo Desideri
- Edited by: Antonio Siciliano
- Music by: Detto Mariano
- Production company: Intercapital
- Distributed by: Cecchi Gori Home Video; Ízaro Films
- Release date: April 16, 1981
- Running time: 90 minutes
- Country: Italy
- Language: Italian

Asso (Ace) is an Italian comedy film, directed by Castellano & Pipolo and released in 1981. The film stars Adriano Celentano, Edwige Fenech, Renato Salvatori, Sylva Koscina, Pippo Santonastaso, Gianni Magni and Elisabetta Viviani. It was filmed in Italy.

== Plot ==
Asso, an ace poker player, has just married his long-time love, Silvia, the most coveted woman in his neighborhood. For her sake, he promises to give up poker, but the unexpected arrival of a notorious player in town and his wife's permission push him into one last game, which he wins. But as he tries to return home the following morning, he is apprehended by Sicario, one of his closer acquaintances and a professional assassin who has been hired to do away with Asso himself.

Shot multiple times, Asso dies but returns as a ghost out of worry for leaving his wife behind without any means of supporting herself. Because of their close bond, Silvia can see and hear him, but to anyone else Asso is invisible. After managing to convince his wife that he really is dead, he tries to get her remarried so she will not end up on the streets, and his choice falls on the feeble but rich banker Luigi Morgan. Morgan is of course delighted to win the attention of such a beautiful lady, but this invites the jealousy of Bretella, Asso's rival for Silvia's hand. As it turns out, Bretella had commissioned Sicario to assassinate Asso and now tries to hire him again to finish off Morgan. Shaken by remorse over killing Asso, Sicario refuses and even promises to go to the police, whereupon Bretella kills him and decides to do the job himself.

However, after getting a short leave of absence from Hell, Sicario reveals Bretella's true intentions to Asso, who rushes to Morgan's protection. He cannot prevent Bretella from kidnapping the banker, but by taking Police Commissioner Rinaldi for a forced ride and thus catching the attention of the police, he does manage to prevent Morgan from getting killed and get Bretella arrested. In his desperation, however, Morgan has started praying to his dead wife for salvation, and once rescued, he revokes his courtship of Silvia due to what he perceives to be his wife's grace.

Alone once more (save for Asso's company), Silvia learns of the arrival of a gifted young card player who is a dead look-alike of Asso. Once she falls for him, Asso fades away and goes to Heaven, where God himself invites him to a round of poker and, following Asso's defeat, a rematch in about three thousand years.

== Cast ==
- Adriano Celentano as Asso/unnamed Card Ace/God
- Edwige Fenech as Silvia
- Renato Salvatori as Bretella
- Sylva Koscina as Enrichetta Morgan
- Pippo Santonastaso as Luigi Morgan
- Gianni Magni as Sicario
- Elisabetta Viviani as The Tourist
- Dino Cassio as Commissioner Rinaldi
- Sandro Ghiani as The Cop
- Raffaele di Sipio as The Choreographer
- Gianni Musy as The Speaker
- Gerry Bruno as Ettore Bruno

== Reception ==
=== Critical response ===
Based on 606 user votes, IMDb grades the movie at 6.2.

== See also ==
- Ghost, a film starring Patrick Swayze and Demi Moore which employs a similar plot.
