= Dino Cassio =

Italian actor and singer (1934–2012)

- Born: 2 April 1934; Bari, Italy
- Died: 9 July 2012 (aged 78); Rome, Italy
- Occupation: Actor
- Years active: 1964-2008

Dino Cassio (2 April 1934 - 9 July 2012) was an Italian actor and singer. He appeared in more than sixty films from 1964 to 2008.

== Selected filmography ==
Year	Title	Role	Notes
1984	Il ragazzo di campagna		
1983	Un povero ricco		
1983	Bonnie and Clyde Italian Style		
1983	"FF.SS." – Cioè: "...che mi hai portato a fare sopra a Posillipo se non mi vuoi più bene?"		
1982	Sesso e volentieri		
1982	Delitto sull'autostrada		
1982	Vieni avanti cretino		
1981	Madly in Love		
1981	La moglie in bianco... l'amante al pepe		
1981	La dottoressa preferisce i marinai		
1981	Asso		
1980	La liceale al mare con l'amica di papà		
1980	La dottoressa ci sta col colonnello		
