= Sexy Shop =

2009 film

- Directed by: Maria Erica Pacileo; Fernando Maraghini
- Written by: Vincenzo Marega
- Produced by: Vincenzo Marega
- Starring: Andrea Chimenti; Ivan Cattaneo; Elisabetta Viviani; Gazebo; Johnson Righeira; Tre Allegri Ragazzi Morti; Maurizio Arcieri
- Cinematography: Danilo Desideri
- Edited by: Tatiana Casini Morigi
- Music by: Claudio Collino
- Release date: 2014
- Country: Italy
- Language: Italian

Sexy Shop is a 2014 Italian comedy film written by Vincenzo Marega and directed by Maria Erica Pacileo and Fernando Maraghini and starring Andrea Chimenti, Ivan Cattaneo, Elisabetta Viviani and Gazebo.

In the film, several protagonists of the Italian music scene of the 1980s appear as actors and clients. The author of the novel, Vincenzo Marega, in addition to participating as an actor, also produced the film by winning the Enzo Biagi Prize in the beginners category "for the quality of the production of cinematographic fiction" at the Sixteenth Italian Television Festival.

== Plot ==
Luca, a fifty-year-old salesman in a sex shop, is struggling with his own dissatisfaction as a musician. The film describes his adventures and those of his two former comrades during a single day. The sex shop is the emblem of the many personalities of the protagonists, of their hidden and unspeakable desires, not only necessarily of a sexual nature.

== Cast ==
- Andrea Chimenti as Luca Gobbi
- Vincenzo Marega as Giorgio
- Uberto Kovacevich as Uberto Stacci
- Giulia Mercati as Betta
- Michele D’Urso: Il carrozziere
- Antonio Barillari as Marshal Antonio Petruzzi
- Alessandro Nicoletti as Brigadier
- Michela Cembran as Pornostar Lilì Roden
- Cindy Cattaruzza as Anna
- Johnson Righeira as Maniacal Customer
- Garbo as Client
- Ivan Cattaneo as Gipsy
- Gazebo as The Doctor
- Maurizio Arcieri as The Mister
- Gian Maria Accusani as The Guy
- Tre Allegri Ragazzi Morti as The Thefter
- Elisabetta Viviani as Onirica's Manager
- Veit Heinichen as Writer
- Luca Riccobon as Trans
- Marisa Fumis as Nurse

== See also ==
- List of Italian films of 2014
