= Veit Heinichen =

German novelist

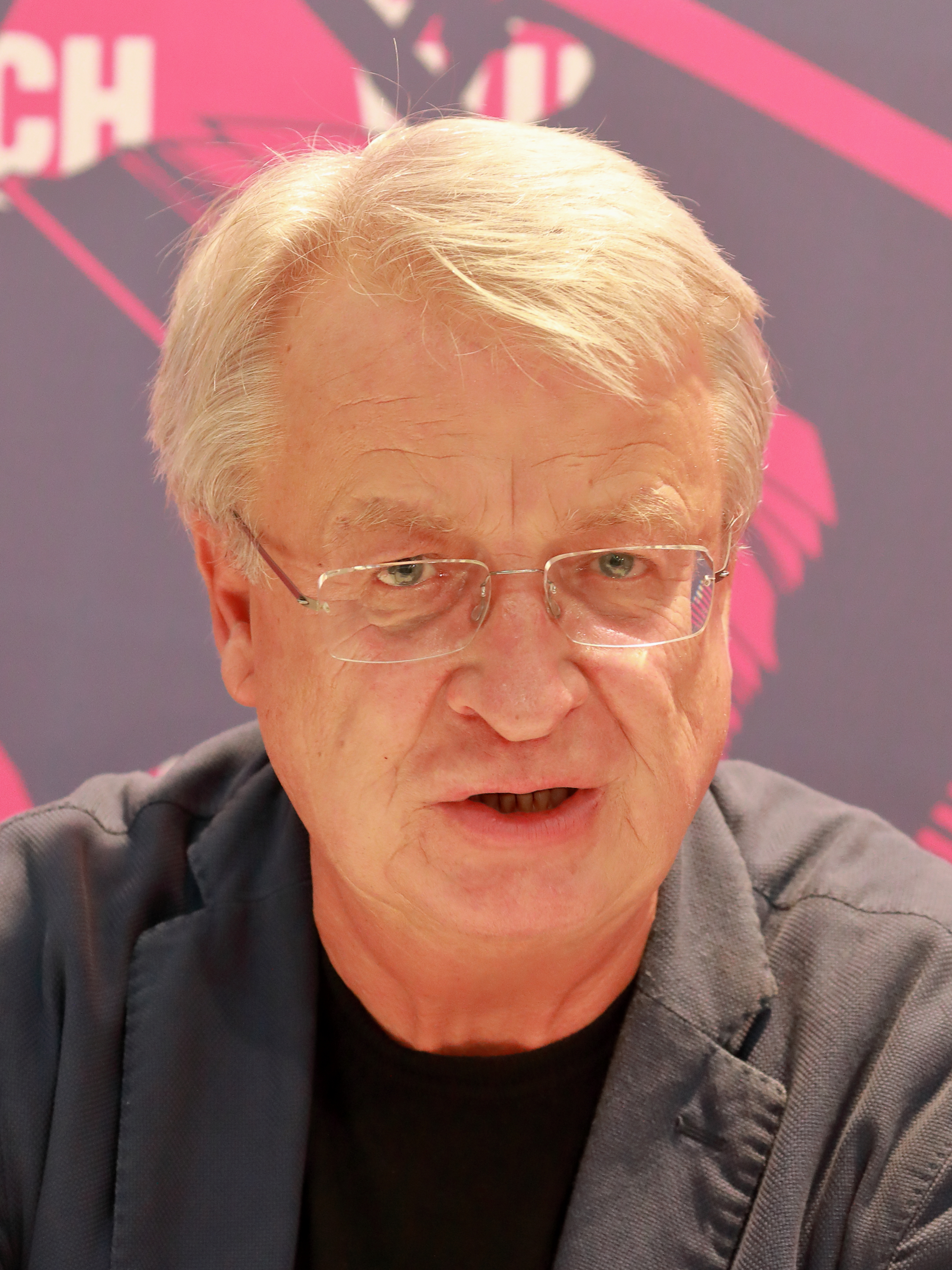
Veit Heinichen (2019)

Veit Heinichen (born 1957, in Villingen-Schwenningen) is a German novelist.

Heinichen studied economics at Stuttgart University, and then worked in publishing. In 1994 together with Arnulf Conradi, chief editor at S. Fischer Verlag, and Conradi's wife Elisabeth Ruge, Heinichen was cofounder of Berlin Verlag. He remained a director until 1999.

Heinichen writes noir novels featuring Commissario Proteo Laurenti as main character. Like his protagonist, he currently lives in Trieste.

== Works ==
Currently the novels of Veit Heinichen are available in 10 different languages. English is not yet one of them. Here is a list of the original works:

- Gib jedem seinen eigenen Tod. Zsolnay, Wien 2001
- Die Toten vom Karst. Zsolnay, Wien 2002
- Tod auf der Warteliste. Zsolnay, Wien 2003
- Der Tod wirft lange Schatten. Zsolnay, Wien 2005
- Triest, Stadt der Winde. Sanssouci, München 2005
- Totentanz. Zsolnay, Wien 2007
- Die Ruhe des Stärkeren. Zsolnay, Wien 2009
- Keine Frage des Geschmacks. Zsolnay, Wien 2011
- Im eigenen Schatten. Zsolnay, Wien 2013

The first four novels plus Totentanz were filmed for the German ARD television series Commissario Laurenti (2006–2009).

In 2014 he acted with the part of a writer in the film-comedy Sexy Shop.
