= Lettre à France =

Single by Michel Polnareff
- B-side: "Mademoiselle De"
- Released: 1977
- Genre: Art rock, progressive rock
- Length: 4:38
- Label: Atlantic
- Songwriters: Michel Polnareff; Jean-Loup Dabadie
- Producers: David Hentschel; Michel Polnareff

Michel Polnareff singles chronology
"Fame à la mode" (1976)	"Lettre à France" (1977)	"Une simple mélodie" (1978)

"Lettre à France" is a single by French singer Michel Polnareff that was released in 1977. The artist had been living in California since 1973, in part due to financial problems. The song, whose title means "Letter to France" in English, is about living in exile, and is a love song to his home country.

The single sold 476 000 copies, allowing Polnareff to return to France to partially resolve his tax problems.

== Track listing ==
- A side: "Lettre à France" — 4:38
- B side: "Mademoiselle De" — 3:40

== Charts ==
=== Weekly charts ===
Chart (1977)	Peak position
France (IFOP)	4
Belgium (Ultratop 50 Wallonia)	6

Chart (2012)	Peak position
France (SNEP)	93

Chart (2014)	Peak position
France (SNEP)	77

=== Year-end charts ===
Chart (1977)	Peak position
France (IFOP)	27

== Musicians ==
- Michel Polnareff
- David Hentschel
- Joe Patridge
- Ronnie Caryl
