= Health in Italy =

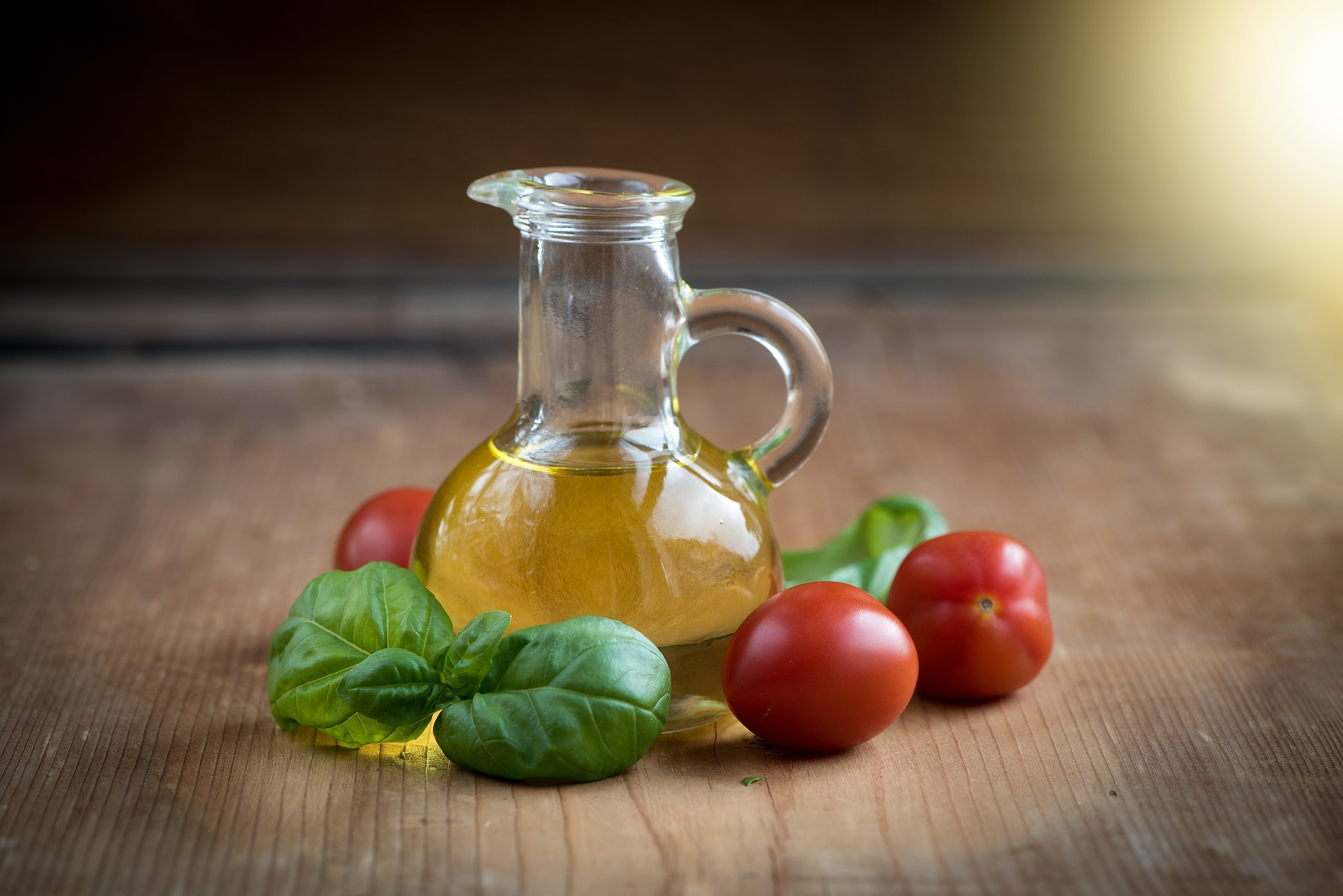
Olive oil and vegetables are central to the Mediterranean diet.

Italy is known for its generally very good health system, and the life expectancy is 80 for males and 85 for females, placing the country 5th in the world for life expectancy, and low infant mortality. In comparison to other Western countries, Italy has a relatively low rate of adult obesity (below 10%), as there are several health benefits of the Mediterranean diet. The proportion of daily smokers was 22% in 2012, down from 24.4% in 2000 but still slightly above the OECD average. Smoking in public places including bars, restaurants, night clubs and offices has been restricted to specially ventilated rooms since 2005.

In 2013, UNESCO added the Mediterranean diet to the Representative List of the Intangible Cultural Heritage of Humanity of Italy (promoter), Morocco, Spain, Portugal, Greece, Cyprus and Croatia. As with any developed country, Italy has adequate and sufficient water and food distribution, and levels of nutrition and sanitation are high. In Italy, medical care is provided for free under a universal healthcare system, which operates on the assumption that healthcare is a human right and should be accessible to everyone regardless of their ability to pay.

== Water and food ==
Italy has a good and sufficient water supply, yet, especially due to droughts, common in the summer (notably in Southern Italy), water shortages can frequently occur. Italians consume a very high amount of mineral water, the highest compared to equivalent neighbours: in 1992, the average person in Italy drank 116 litres, compared to 105 in Belgium, 93 in Germany and 80 in France. According to studies, 18 million people in Italy annually are confronted with at least one slight water shortage, and 18% of Italian families have been recorded as having irregular distribution patterns. Some water distribution is also uneven, and can be explained by economic factors; for example, people in Lombardy, Italy's richest region, drink nine times more bottled water than Campania, one of the country's poorest.

A problem which often presents itself regarding drinking water is water pollution and the presence of harmful purifying chemicals and/or herbicides, which can cause several health problems. According to a decree issued by the state, the maximum presence of herbicides or similar materials in Italy drinking water is 0.5 μg per litre.

Italy's nutritious and generally healthy cuisine ensures that Italians are well-nourished and eat good food. The relatively recent addition of several drugs to meats has meant that controls have increased from 4,000 in 1988 to 56,831 in 1991.

== Radiation ==
Being a relatively warm and sunny country, Italians are often exposed to direct radiation from the sun (ultraviolet radiation), which, if not protected from sun cream or block, can create carcinogenic skin diseases, such as skin cancer. Despite this, the greatest risk from exposure to radiation is found indoors.

== Life expectancy and mortality ==
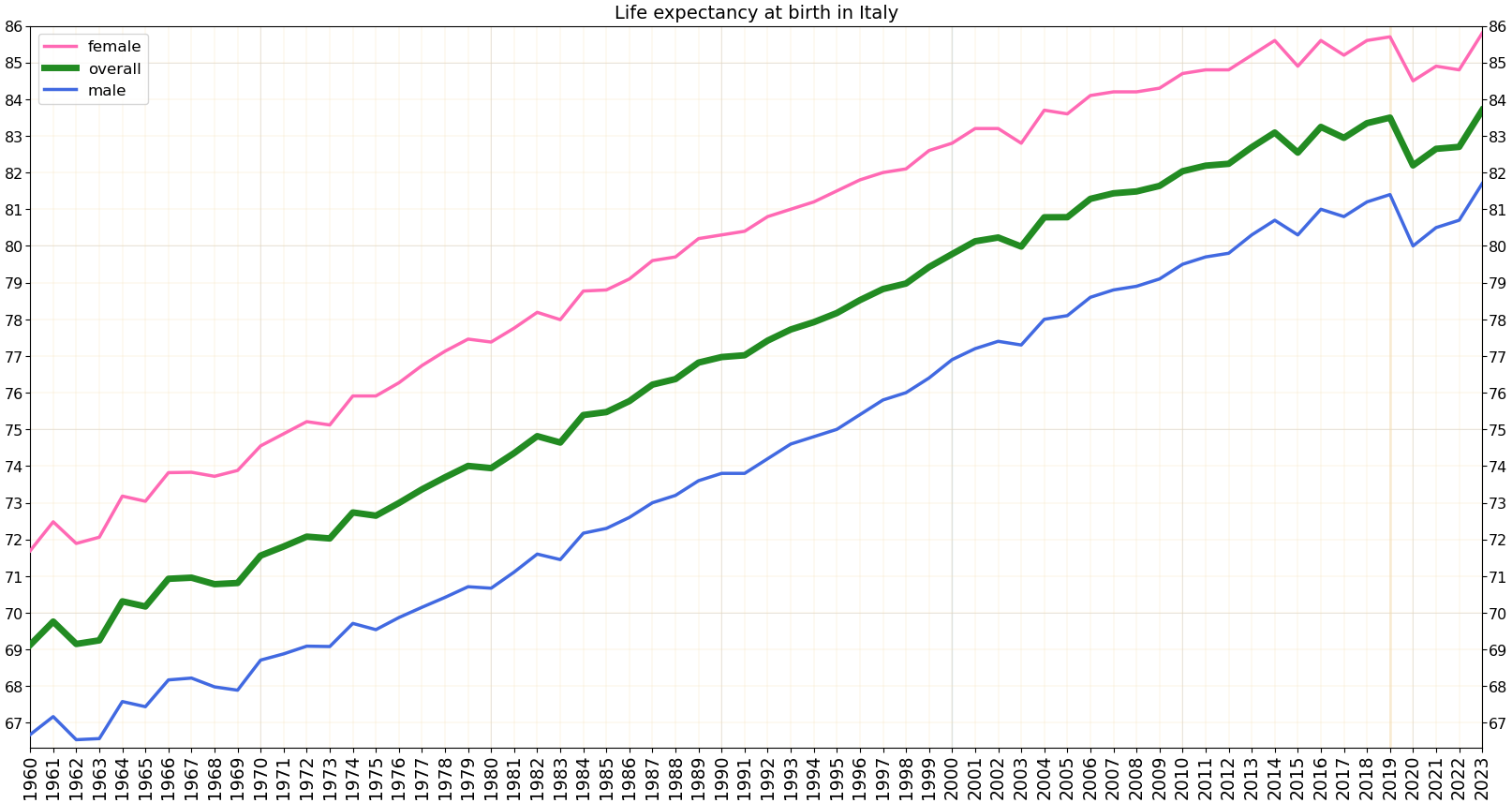
Life expectancy at birth in Italy

Italy has one of the highest life expectancies in the world. Italy's high average varies greatly by regions. In the more affluent north, the life expectancy at birth in 1990 for a man was lower than in Italy's south (73.3 compared to 74.2). For a woman, the average is higher in the north than in the south (80.6 compared to 79.8). Central Italy has the highest average, with 74.7 for men and 81.0 for women.

In 2003, the average national life expectancy at birth for a woman was 78~84, and for a man 71~77. By 2009, this average had increased to 77.26 for men, and 83.33 for women. As of 2019, Italian women life expectancy is 85/86 years, whereas for Italian men is 81 years.

Italy also has a very low rate of infant mortality, that of 5.51 out of 1000 people, the 185th lowest in the world. From 1970 to 1989, the death rate went down dramatically, from 11 and 10.3 for men and women, to 8.3 and 6.7.

In 2015, Liguria had the highest cancer mortality of any region in Europe, at 377 per 100,000 population.

== Vaccination ==
The Italian vaccination system is complex because services and decisions are delivered by 21 separate regional authorities creates many variations. There is a National committee on immunizations that updates the national recommended immunization schedule, with input from the ministry of health representatives, regional health authorities, national institute of health, and other scientific societies. Regions may add more scheduled vaccinations, but cannot exempt citizens from nationally mandated or recommended ones. A nationwide plan for eliminating measles and rubella began in 2001.

Childhood vaccinations included in national schedules are free for all Italian children and foreign children who live in the country. Estimated coverage for the required three doses of HBV-Hib-IPV vaccines is at least 95% of 2 year olds. Influenza is the only nationally necessary vaccine for adults, and is administered by general practitioners. Italy has a national vaccine injury compensation program. One evaluation of vaccine coverage in 2010, which covered the 2008 birth cohort, showed a slight decline in immunization insurance coverage rates of diphtheria, hepatitis B, polio, and tetanus after those specific vaccinations had been made mandatory. However, vaccination levels continued to pass the Italian government's goal of 95% outreach.

Aiming to integrate immunization strategies across the country and equitize access to disease prevention, the Italian Ministry of Health issued the National Immunization Prevention Plan (Piano Nazionale Prevenzione Vaccinale) in 2012 which proposed an institutional "lifecourse" approach to vaccination. HPV vaccine coverage increased, and pneumococcal vaccine and meningococcal C vaccines had a positive public reception. However, both infant vaccine coverage rates and influenza immunization in the elderly have been decreasing. A 2015 government plan in Italy aimed to boost vaccination rates and introduce a series of new vaccines, and triggered protests among public health professionals. Partially in response to the statistic that less than 86% of Italian children receive the measles shot, the National Vaccination Plan for 2016–18 (PNPV) increased vaccination requirements. Chickenpox shots would be required for newborns. Under this plan, government spending on vaccines would double to €620 million annually, and children could be barred from attending school without proving vaccination. Although these implementations would make Italy a European frontrunner in vaccination, some experts questioned the need for several of the vaccines, and some physicians worried about the potential punishment they may face if they do not comply with the proposed regulations.

There were 5,000 cases of measles in 2017, up from 870 in 2016, 29% of all those in the European Union. The law compelling children to have 10 vaccinations in order to enroll at state schools came into effect in March 2018 but in August 2018 the Five Star Movement pushed legislation through the Italian Senate abolishing it. It has not yet passed the Chamber of Deputies but parents do not now have to provide schools with a doctor's note to show their children have been vaccinated.

== Smoking ==
Smoking in Italy has decreased greatly in the past decades for men, yet women have had a less definitive pattern. From a country where in 1966 a 68.5% average of the male population smoked, this had gone down to a ~37% average in 1991. For women, it increased from ~15% for women in 1966, to ~16.5%, notably in the centre, where it has gone up from 15% to 20.1%.

== Climate change ==
Indeed, increases in temperature, ozone concentration or fine dust, particularly in urban areas, would increase deaths from ischaemic heart disease, stroke, metabolic disorders and nephropathy, due to heat stress. This impact is most likely to affect vulnerable people such as the elderly, children, pregnant women and people with chronic diseases, and widens the inequality gap in health care.

Rising temperatures and heat waves are one of the causes of death every year in Italy, which has prompted Italy to create the Heat Wave Forecasting and Warning System bulletins. The Ministry of Health set up Heat Wave Warning and Forecasting System (HHWWS) bulletins, some time before the 2022 European heat wave.

Climate change has caused many impacts, and this can be shown through the Climate Risk Index 2020 ranking which reports events between 1999 and 2018. The studies rank the impacts of climate change in terms of economic losses, GDP losses and deaths.

In the ranking that records the highest number of deaths related to extreme weather events, Italy is the 6th country in the world and the first in Europe with almost 20,000 people dying due to floods and heat waves.

== See also ==
- Healthcare in Italy
- Obesity in Italy
