= La Poupée qui fait non =

1966 song by Michel Polnareff

Single by Michel Polnareff

from the album Love Me, Please Love Me
- Language: French
- English title: The Doll Who Says No
- Released: 26 May 1966
- Recorded: 1966
- Studio: Southern Studios (Wood Green, Haringey, London)
- Genre: Pop
- Length: 3:13
- Label: Disc'AZ
- Composer: Michel Polnareff
- Lyricist: Franck Gérald
- Producer: Jean Bouchety

Michel Polnareff singles chronology
"La Poupée qui fait non" (1966)	"Love Me, Please Love Me" (1966)

Music video
- "La Poupée qui fait non" on YouTube

"La Poupée qui fait non" (transl. "The doll who says no") is a 1966 song written by Franck Gérald (lyrics) and French singer/songwriter Michel Polnareff (music). It was recorded by Polnareff, becoming an immediate success in France and one of Polnareff most definitive songs. Jimmy Page played guitar on the recording. It also appeared as the last track in his album Love Me, Please Love Me.

Polnareff also made language versions of the song in German ("Meine Puppe sagt non"), Italian ("Una bambolina che fa no, no, no"), and Spanish ("Muñeca que hace no") which helped the song get airplay all over Europe and become hits in language versions by local artists in 1966.

There have been tens of covers of the song in English and various languages in the following decades. Polnareff's version from the album Live at the Roxy was also released as a single in 1996, exactly 30 years from the original.

== Cover versions ==
There have been several covers of the song

=== French language ===
- The song was covered by Les Sultans and produced by Denis Pantis. It was released on Télédisc in 1966 with great commercial success
- Johnny Hallyday made a cover in his album À partir de maintenant released in 1980
- Cristina also released her 1980 single, a jazzy and funky cover of "La Poupée qui fait non"
- Tomislav Ivčić made a cover in his cover album 'Monia - Francuska ploča' released in 1985
- Sonoko, a Japanese act included the song on their 1987 album La Débutante (with some verses in broken French)
- Mylène Farmer et Khaled sang it as a duo live in 1997. It appeared on the album Live à Bercy and was released eventually as a single reaching #6 in France and #5 in Belgium's French charts
- American band Luna covered the song on the 1999 compilation album Pop Romantique: French Pop Classics, this version was later released on the band's Lunafied compilation album of covers.
- Danielle, a German club act released an EP entitled just "La Poupée" in 2005 on Storm Records and Kontor Records. The EP contained four versions, all club interpretations of the song: "La Poupee" Radio Version, Club Edit Version, Pop Radio Version and Extended Mix Version (mixed by Gerret Frerichs) and a fifth track "Ave Maria".
- Dynamics made a 2010 ska/reggae version of the song with additional original spoken lyrics
- James Blunt sang it live in Paris on 14 July 2008 at a performance for the Bastille Day
- Florent Pagny published a version of this song on his 2001 CD 2 as a duet with Kad

=== English language ===
- The Birds covered it in English.
- The Jimi Hendrix Experience recorded a version of "La Poupée Qui Fait Non" in 29 March 1967, in De Lane Lea Studios in London. This was a jam that had proceeded between takes of Hendrix's "Manic Depression" during The Experience's "Are You Experienced?" sessions. Whilst not being released officially, many bootlegs, such as "Jimi Hendrix In The Studio", feature the song within its release
- Scott McKenzie recorded a version entitled "No, No, No, No, No", released in 1967.
- Dana Gillespie recorded the song as "No! No! No!" on her 1968 Decca debut album Foolish Seasons.
- The 222s, a Canadian punk rock band made a bilingual English/French rock cover of the song as "La Poupee Qui Fait Non (She's A Doll)", with the B-side including an instrumental version as "La Poupee Qui Fait Non (Version Instrumentale)". It was released in Canada as vinyl 7" on Gamma label
- Saint Etienne released a live recording of the song, produced by Edwyn Collins, entitled "La Poupee Qui Fait Non (No, No, No)", as the B-side to their 1994 single "Hug My Soul".

=== Other language covers by Polnareff ===
The song became very popular in many markets after Michel Polnareff recorded the song with new lyrics in three languages:

- German - "Meine Puppe sagt non"
- Italian - "Una bambolina che fa no, no, no"
- Spanish - "Muñeca que hace no"

=== Other language covers by others ===
Many language covers followed in a number of countries most notably:

- Senka Veletanlić, a Yugoslavian (Croatian) singer covered it the same year Polnareff released the original in 1966. Title, Lutka koja kaže ne is simple translation of the original title.
- I Rokketti, an Italian band covered it in a single release by CBS the same year Polnareff released the original in 1966, with the B-side as "Ha Ha".
- I Quelli, another Italian band pre-Premiata Forneria Marconi, covered in a single issued by Ricordi label in 18 October 1966.
- Ivan Cattaneo covered it in 1983 in Italian as "Una bambolina che fa no, no, no (La poupée qui fait non)". Polnareff had already done the version in Italian. It was released as a glam rock version on CGD, Ariola Eurodisc Benelux B.V. that included in addition "Bang Bang (Al Cuore Bang Bang)", "Piangi Con Me" and "Lo Ho In Mente Te (You Were on My Mind)"
- Bobby di Carlo in Brazil, covered it as "A Boneca Que Diz Não" in 1967.
- Harkaliðið, a Faroese band, covered it as "Lisa".

=== Instrumental covers ===
- Jimi Hendrix made an instrumental version (actually Jimi played bass and Noel Redding guitar on this jam)

== Mylène Farmer and Khaled version ==
"La Poupée qui fait non"

Single by Mylène Farmer and Khaled

from the album Live à Bercy
- B-side: "L'Autre" (live version)
- Released: 29 April 1997
- Recorded: 1996
- Venue: Palais Omnisports Paris-Bercy
- Genre: Pop
- Length: 4:39
- Label: Polydor
- Composer: Michel Polnareff
- Lyricist: Franck Gérald
- Producer: Laurent Boutonnat

Mylène Farmer singles chronology
"Rêver" (1996)	"La Poupée qui fait non" (1997)	"Ainsi soit je... (live)" (1997)

French artist Mylène Farmer's 1996 version as duo with Algerian-French rai singer Khaled proved to be one of the most successful French covers of the song. The Farmer/Khaled cover was performed during Farmer's 1996 concert tour. After three live performances, the song was finally released as the first single from Farmer's second live album, Live à Bercy on 29 April 1997, and became a top five hit in Belgium and reached #6 in the French SNEP Singles Chart.

=== Early studio recording ===
There was a studio version of this duet, but it was never released. This studio version was performed in lip-sync in a single television show, Tip top, broadcast on a French channel and host by Éric Jean-Jean, where Farmer was invited to promote her single "Comme j'ai mal". Previously, the show proposed to Farmer a list of singers with whom she would sing a song. She chose Khaled and decided to perform a cover of Polnareff's song, "La Poupée qui fait non", and the recording lasted four hours.

Interviewed by the French magazine Instant-Mag, Thierry Rogen, the sound engineer who had participated in the recording, said: "I have participated in the single "La Poupée qui fait non" with Khaled. Laurant [Boutonnat] was absent. The recording was made in the studio Merga in Suresnes in the right mood. It has been very rapid. Mylène [Farmer] and Khaled were together for four hours in total".

Farmer said she chose the song because it was the first song she learned when she was a child, and she loved Michel Polnareff's work. Khaled also said: "This is a common idea, we wanted to sing together. We loved both Polnareff. Personally, I think it's the first song I learned."

on 11 July 2025 the studio recording was released on her compilation album 86/97 for the first time.

=== Live performance ===
The live version, which was released in 1997, was performed only three nights (two in Geneva and the last at Bercy) as a duet on stage during the 1996 tour. This remained the only collaboration between two artists.

The two remixes available on the CD maxi and the promotional vinyl were produced by Mylène Farmer (this is the only time she has participated in remixes of one of her singles), in collaboration with Thierry Rogen.

When the song was released, Khaled declared that he found Farmer very sympathetic. However, later, he said he had felt used by her, since she put herself forward all the time when they performed the song and were interviewed; according to a 2009 edition of Nouvel Observateur, Khaled qualified this collaboration as a "trap".

=== Critical reception ===
The song generally received negative reviews. According to the author Erwan Chuberre, the duo Khaled / Farmer "which blends the sun and the darkness is on the limit of credibility". "The two worlds [of both singers] really failed to merge and this cover is soon forgotten!" Instant-Mag considered as "absurd" the fact that the studio version was never released, and found that the song "was much harmed by the remixes that accompany it, in which we have as the hazy impression that Mylène was amused herself (and without supervision) to press the buttons on the console of Thierry Rogen".

In France, the single debuted at a peak of number six on 3 May 1997. However, like Farmer's previous top ten hits, it dropped rather quickly and fell off the top 50 after eight weeks.

Surprisingly, the song was a big success in Belgium, where it had a better chart trajectory in the Ultratop 50 than in France. It appeared on the chart for a total of 18 weeks from 24 May 1997, peaked at number five on 21 June, and managed to remain for eight weeks in the top ten. The song ranked at number 41 in the End of year chart.

=== B-side: "L'autre..." ===
The B-side CD single features the 1996 live version of the song "L'autre...".

According to the author Benoît Cachin, in the lyrics the singer seems to await her alter ego who would be "a herald", an angel, that would be her double and her friend. The song has been performed twice on television, exclusively on TF1: on Star 90 on 13 May 1991, and on Avis de Recherche in 1992. In the ten last seconds of the first performance, she began to cry. It has also been sung on the 1996 tour, in which Farmer was dressed in red and was crouched before the audience at the end of the song. It was also performed during the 2006 tour and eventually replaced "Ainsi soit je..." which was performed the first four shows and Farmer always cried. During the Nevermore Tour, it replaced "Pas le temps de vivre" which was only performed on the first three shows.

=== Formats and track listings ===
These are the formats and track listings of single releases of "La Poupée qui fait non":

- CD single

No.	Title	Length
1.	"La Poupée qui fait non" (live version)	4:30
2.	"L'Autre" (live version)	5:15

- CD maxi / CD maxi - Digipack / CD maxi - Digipack, Israel

No.	Title	Length
1.	"La Poupée qui fait non" (live version)	4:30
2.	"La Poupée qui fait non" (say it like you used to club remix)	7:50
3.	"La Poupée qui fait non" (I want a man mix)	6:30
4.	"L'Autre" (live version)	5:15

- 12" maxi - Promo

No.	Title	Length
1.	"La Poupée qui fait non" (say it like you used to club remix)	7:50
2.	"La Poupée qui fait non" (I want a man mix)	6:30

- Digital download / CD single - Promo / CD single - Promo - Luxurious edition

No.	Title	Length
1.	"La Poupée qui fait non" (live version)	4:30

- VHS - Promo

No.	Title	Length
1.	"La Poupée qui fait non" (video)	4:28

=== Release history ===
Date	Label	Region	Format	Catalog
March 1997	Polydor	France, Belgium	CD single - Promo	3537
March 1997	Polydor	France, Belgium	7" maxi - Promo	2785
March 1997	Polydor	France, Belgium	CD maxi - Promo	3546
March 1997	Polydor	France, Belgium	VHS - Promo	—
29 April 1997	Polydor	France, Belgium	CD single	573 872-2
29 April 1997	Polydor	France, Belgium	CD maxi (+ in Israel)	573 873-2

=== Official versions ===
Version	Length	Album	Remixed by	Year	Comment
"La Poupée qui fait non"
Live album version (recorded in 1996)	4:30 (audio); 5:20 (video)	Live à Bercy	—	1996	See the previous sections
Live single version	4:30	—	—	1997	This version is shorter than the live album one because the final applause are deleted.
Say it like you used to club remix	7:50	—	Mylène Farmer, Thierry Rogen	1997	It is an Arabist version in which all the lyrics are deleted, except "C'est une poupée", sung by Farmer.
I want a man mix	6:30	—	Mylène Farmer, Thierry Rogen	1997	There is only few words in this version, as all lyrics originally sung by Khaled are deleted.
Live music video	4:30	Music Videos II & III	—	1997	
"L'Autre"
Album version	5:26	L'autre...	—	1991	See the previous sections
Live version (recorded in 1996)	5:50	Live à Bercy	—	1996	The performance is very similar to the album one. The audience sings the song, while Farmer is overwhelmed by emotion. (see 1996 tour)
Live single version	5:21	—	—	1997	This version is identical to the live performance, but the last refrain sung by the audience has been deleted.
Live version (recorded in 2006)	7:25	Avant que l'ombre... à Bercy	—	2006	This is an acoustic version of the song. (see Avant que l'ombre... à Bercy (tour))

=== Credits and personnel ===
These are the credits and the personnel as they appear on the back of the single:

- Franck Gérald – lyrics
- Michel Polnareff – music
- Requiem Publishing – editions
- Polydor – recording company
- Claude Gassian – photo
- Com'N.B – design
- Copyright control by Michel Polnareff / S.E.M.I. For F.Gérald

=== Charts ===
==== Weekly charts ====
Chart (1997)	Peak position
Belgium (Ultratop 50 Wallonia)	5
Europe (European Hot 100 Singles)	34
France (SNEP)	6
Quebec (ADISQ)	45

==== Year-end charts ====
Chart (1997)	Position
Belgium (Ultratop 50 Wallonia)	41

== Re-use in other media ==
Several versions of the song are used as the transition to "The Fun Half" theme on The Majority Report; a left-leaning political news and information podcast hosted by Sam Seder.

== Sources ==
- Cachin, Benoît (2006). Le Dictionnaire des Chansons de Mylène Farmer (in French). Tournon. ISBN 2-35144-000-5.
- Cachin, Benoît (2006). Mylène Farmer Influences (in French). Mascara. ISBN 978-2-35144-026-1.
- Chuberre, Erwan (2007). L'Intégrale Mylène Farmer (in French). City. ISBN 978-2-35288-108-7.
- Chuberre, Erwan (2008). Mylène Farmer, phénoménale (in French). City. ISBN 978-2-35288-176-6.
- Chuberre, Erwan (18 June 2009). Mylène Farmer : Des mots sur nos désirs (in French). Alphée. ISBN 978-2-7538-0477-7.
- Rajon, Florence (2005). Mylène Farmer de A à Z (in French). MusicBook. ISBN 2-84343-319-3.
- Royer, Hugues (2008). Mylène, biographie (in French). Spain: Flammarion. ISBN 978-2-35287-139-2.
- Violet, Bernard (2004). Mylène Farmer, biographie (in French). J'ai lu. ISBN 2-290-34916-X.
