= Madly in Love =

- Italian theatrical release poster by Renato Casaro
- Italian: Innamorato pazzo
- Directed by: Castellano; Pipolo
- Written by: Franco Castellano; Giuseppe Moccia
- Produced by: Mario Cecchi Gori; Vittorio Cecchi Gori
- Starring: Adriano Celentano; Ornella Muti
- Cinematography: Danilo Desideri
- Edited by: Antonio Siciliano
- Music by: Bruno Zambrini
- Production company: Cinecittà
- Distributed by: United Artists Europa
- Release date: 18 December 1981 (Italy)
- Running time: 102 minutes
- Country: Italy
- Language: Italian

Madly in Love (Italian: Innamorato pazzo) is a 1981 Italian romantic comedy film written and directed by Castellano & Pipolo, starring Adriano Celentano and Ornella Muti.

== Plot ==
Cristina, the princess of a fictional monarchical state named Saint Tulipe, is visiting Rome with her father, Gustavo VI, who is trying to appeal to Italy's national bank for a loan to buoy his country's financial crisis. Bored and rebellious, Cristina sneaks away from the embassy and decides to engage in a sightseeing tour of the city. On the bus she takes, Cristina meets driver Barnaba Cecchini, who instantly falls in love with her.

Barnaba, a charming and happy-to-go ATAC employee, takes Cristina around the city, including the Roman Forum, and slowly begins to win her personal interest. However, after having had her fun and spending a (chaste) night in his apartment, she locks him into his clothes dresser's massive drawer and leaves with her family's bodyguards without telling him about her true identity. After a fruitless search on his own, Barnaba recognizes her when he witnesses a TV report about her sojourn in Rome, and despite his modest background, he boldly asks her father for her hand. When Gustavo refuses, Barnaba engages in a series of daredevil schemes to prove his worth, even to the point of appearing (by Cristina's invitation) at a royal banquet in his ATAC uniform and holding successful discussions about high politics with a number of international dignitaries.

However, although Barnaba succeeds in impressing Gustavo and winning Cristina's genuine affection, Saint Tulipe's financial crisis finally drives the king into engaging his daughter to an arms manufacturer. Determined not to lose the love of his life, Barnaba appeals to the citizens of Rome to make a donation for the cause. As Gustavo's family leaves the city, Barnaba's sympathizers shower them with money, thus annulling both the royal debts and Cristina's planned engagement to a stranger, and Barnaba gaining Gustavo's approval to marry his daughter.

== Cast ==
- Adriano Celentano as Barnaba Cecchini
- Ornella Muti as Cristina
- Adolfo Celi as Re Gustavo
- Gerry Bruno as the waiter
- Enzo Garinei as the Consul
- Tiberio Murgia as the carpet seller
- Corrado Olmi as the Mayor
- Milla Sannoner as Queen Betsy
- Dino Cassio as the officer
- Franco Diogene as the waiter-chief

== Production ==
The film was shot in Como, with scenes filmed in Villa Olmo and in Rome.

== Reception ==
The film was a commercial success.
