= Bulles (album) =

Studio album by Michel Polnareff
- Released: 1981
- Label: AZ
- Producer: Michel Polnareff

Michel Polnareff chronology
Coucou me revoilou (1978)	Bulles (1981)	Show télé 82/Public (1982)

Bulles is an album by French singer-songwriter Michel Polnareff released in 1981.
With this album, the singer found more success, as it sold 800,000 copies. "Radio", "Je t'aime", and "Tam-Tam" were put into heavy rotation on French radio stations. Although mostly rock-oriented, Polnareff maintains his personality lyrically and musically. In 2001, the album was re-issued by Universal-Polygram.

== Track listing ==
Music by Michel Polnareff, lyrics by Michel Polnareff and J.P. Dréau.

Side A

1. "Tam tam"
2. "Elle rit" (Translation: "She Laughs")
3. "Radio"
4. "Je t'aime" (Translation: "I Love You")

Side B

1. "Où est la tosca?"
2. "Joue moi de toi"
3. "365 jours par an" (Translation: "365 Days A Year")
4. "Bulles de savon" (Translation: "Soap Bubbles")

== Personnel ==
- Ricky Hitchcock — guitars
- Mo Foster — bass
- Michel Polnareff – vocals, piano, keyboards, percussion, male and female chorus, arranger
- Richard Myhill – piano, keyboards, male chorus, musical director
- Graham Preskett – keyboards, violin solo
- Hans Zimmer — keyboards,
- Robin Landridge – keyboards
- Peter Van Hooke — drums
- Brett Morgan — drums
- Frank Ricotti — drums
- Mac Tontoh – drums
- Daku Potato – drums
- Allan Parker – banjo
- Linda Jardim – female chorus
- Modesty Forbids – female chorus
- Ray Springfield – flute

== Production ==
- Producer – M. Polnareff
- Engineer – Brad Davis, Steve Allan
- Mixing – R. Myhill, M. Polnareff, G. Preskett
- Mastering – B. Davis
- Album cover design – Hicks and Hayes
- Photography – John Thornton
- Recorded at studios Snake Ranch, Nova, Marcus Music.
