= Madly in Love (song) =

- Official 1990 Picture Sleeve

Single by Bros

from the album The Time
- B-side: Madly in Love (Joe Smooth 12" Pop Mix)
- Released: 10 March 1990
- Studio: (London, England)
- Length: 3:33
- Label: CBS
- Songwriters: Matt Goss; Luke Goss; Nicky Graham
- Producer: Nicky Graham

Bros singles chronology
"Sister" (1989)	"Madly in Love" (1990)	"Are You Mine" (1991)

"Madly in Love" is a song by British pop band Bros, released on 10 March 1990 by CBS Records as the fourth single from their second album, The Time (1989). It reached number 14 on the UK Singles Chart and number seven in Ireland on the IRMA Singles Chart.

== Track listings ==
- UK 7-inch and cassette single
1. "Madly in Love" (Smooth Mix)
2. "Madly in Love" (Joe Smooth 12" Pop Mix)
3. "Madly in Love" (Joe Smooth Piano Dub)

== Charts ==
Chart	Peak position
Belgium (Ultratop 50 Flanders)	29
Ireland (IRMA)	7
Israel (Israeli Singles Chart)	34
Spain Airplay (Top 40 Radio)	13
UK Singles (Official Charts)	14
UK Airplay (Music & Media)	9

== Credits ==
- Written by Matt Goss, Luke Goss, Nicky Graham
- Engineer – Doc Dougherty
- Photography by Michael Banks (5)
- Producer – Nicky Graham
- Remix, Producer – Joe Smooth
- Nicky Graham – producer
- Published by EMI Music Publishing
- Published by Graham Music Publishers Ltd.
- Published by Intersong Music Ltd.
