= Diana Est =

- Born: Cristina Barbieri; 12 June 1963 (age 63)
- Origin: Milan, Italy
- Genre: Italo disco
- Occupation: Singer
- Years active: 1981–1985
- Label: Dischi Ricordi

Cristina Barbieri (born 12 June 1963), best known as Diana Est, is an Italian singer who retired in the mid-1980s.

== Life and career ==
Born in Milan, Barbieri started her career as the vocalist in a new wave group formed by alumni of the Santa Marta Music School in her hometown, first using her birth name Cristina, then adopting a number of stage names. In 1981, she was put under contract by Dischi Ricordi and adopted the stage name Diana Est. Shortly later, she made her record debut with "Tenax", an Italo disco song written by Enrico Ruggeri whose lyrics were partly in Italian and partly in Latin. In 1983, she got her main hit with the song "Le Louvre", still written by Ruggeri.

Following a further single, and once her contract with Ricordi expired, Est abruptly decided to quit showbusiness in the mid-1980s. In 2002, the novelist Matteo B. Bianchi wrote a short story, Magnifica ossessione (i.e. "Magnificent obsession") about the imaginary life of Est after her retirement.

Barbieri is the niece of singer-songwriter Mario Lavezzi.

== Discography ==
Singles

- "Tenax" / "Notte senza pietà" (1982)
- "Le louvre" / "Marmo di città" / "Le louvre" (instrumental) (1983)
- "Diamanti" / "Pekino" (1984)
