= Love Me, Please Love Me (Michel Polnareff album) =

Studio album by Michel Polnareff
- Released: 1966
- Recorded: 1966
- Genre: Pop rock
- Length: 30:01
- Language: French
- Label: Disc'AZ
- Producers: Jean Bouchety; Charles Blackwell

Michel Polnareff chronology
Love Me, Please Love Me (1966)	Volume 2 (1967)

Love Me, Please Love Me is the 1966 debut album by French singer-songwriter Michel Polnareff. It was known originally as the self-titled album Michel Polnareff, but was identified later by the title song "Love Me, Please Love Me".

The album contained collaborations with renowned songwriters like Frank Gérald, A. Kopelman, and British songwriter Keith Reid (songwriter of Procol Harum). With Reid, Polnareff co-wrote the all-English "Time Will Tell" and "You'll Be on My Mind" for the album. The album topped the French Albums Chart.

The French edition of the magazine Rolling Stone classified the album as the 39th best French rock album ever. The album was certified gold.

== Love Me, Please Love Me ==
"Love Me, Please Love Me", the title song from the album, is mainly in French with only the English words (Love me, please love me) used in the title and lyrics. The song was co-written by Polnareff and French songwriter Frank Gérald.

The song was recorded in London's Pye Studios and the arrangement and musical direction was by British Charles Blackwell, creating a memorable piano intro, orchestration with piano. violin, two drums and three backing vocals to give it a distinctive sound. "The piano tune and the combination of the text sung in French with the English title franglais gave it something special," says Dutch Ondergewaardeerde Liedjes.

When the song was proposed for awards at Rose d'or d'Antibes, the jury made up of 11 specialists including Danielle Heymann of L'Express, Christophe Izard of France-Soir and André Lafarge of Parisien libéré gave it the special "Prix de la Critique" (Critics' Award).

=== Release ===
In its first week of release, it showed at number 2 of the popular and greatly followed hit parade published by Salut les copains entertainment magazine.

It quickly became the biggest French summer hit of 1966, greatly supported by Lucien Morisse, the head of widely listened station Europe 1. Despite initial criticism of Polnareff having used English in the title as a display of franglais, critic Jean-Michel Boris, says the song became an integral part of the vivid memory of French chansons.

The song was number 1 on Ultratop Wallonia francophone market in Belgium and stayed 25 weeks in the chart also peaking at number 7 on Belgium Flamand music market counting 14 weeks on the Flamand chart. It also charted in Germany reaching number 21. It also made it to the Dutch Top 40 for 2 weeks.

=== Covers ===
In 1966 Mario Tessuto covered the Italian version (lyric by Herbert Pagani) (CGD, N 9639) for the 1969 album Lisa dagli occhi blu (Lisa with blue eyes) (CGD, POP 76).

Many artists have covered the title song, most notably Sandie Shaw in 1967. Her version was all in English with new lyrics. The track was also included in her 1967 album also titled Love Me, Please Love Me. Sandie Shaw was so successful she released an Italian version for the Italian market as "Amami, ti prego amami".

In 1967, Le Grand Orchestre de Paul Mauriat recorded an orchestral version without any lyrics. Other artists that have recorded it in French or in translated lyrics in other languages include Jimmie Rodgers, The Tonics, Gilbert Montagné, The Residents, Vive La Fête & Bruno Lomas.

== La Poupée qui fait non ==
"La Poupée qui fait non" (English: "The Doll That Says No") is a 1966 song written by Franck Gérald (lyrics) and French singer/songwriter Michel Polnareff (music). It was recorded by Polnareff, becoming an immediate success in France and one of Polnareff most definitive songs. Jimmy Page (Led Zeppelin/Yardbirds) played guitar on the recording.

Polnareff also made language versions of the song in German ("Meine Puppe sagt non"), Italian ("Una bambolina che fa no, no, no"), and Spanish ("Muñeca que hace no") which helped the song get airplay all over Europe and become hits in language versions by local artists in 1966.

There have been tens of covers of the song in English and various languages in the following decades. Polnareff's version from the album Live at the Roxy was also released as a single in 1996, exactly 30 years from the original.

== Track listing ==
1. "Sous quelle étoile suis-je né?" ("Under Which Star Was I Born?") (Frank Gérald, Michel Polnareff) — 3:50
2. "Time Will Tell" (Keith Reid, M. Polnareff) — 2:22
3. "Ballade pour toi" ("Ballad for You") (A. Kopelman, M. Polnareff) — 2:40
4. "L'Oiseau de nuit" ("The Night Bird") (F. Gérald, M. Polnareff) — 2:49
5. "Love Me, Please Love Me" (F. Gérald, M. Polnareff) — 4:20
6. "Histoire de cœur" ("History of the Heart") (M. Polnareff) — 2:49
7. "Ballade pour un puceau" ("Ballad for a Virgin") (M. Polnareff) — 2:16
8. "You'll Be on My Mind" (K. Reid, M. Polnareff) — 2:30
9. "L'Amour avec toi" ("The Love with You") (M. Polnareff) — 3:07
10. "La Poupée qui fait non" (F. Gérald, M. Polnareff) — 3:13

=== Single track listing ===
1. "Love Me, Please Love Me"
2. "L'Amour avec toi"
3. "Ne me marchez pas sur les pieds" ("Don't Step on My Feet")

== Chart performance ==
Chart (1966)	Peak position
French Albums (SNEP)	1
