= Michel Polnareff =

French singer-songwriter (born 1944)

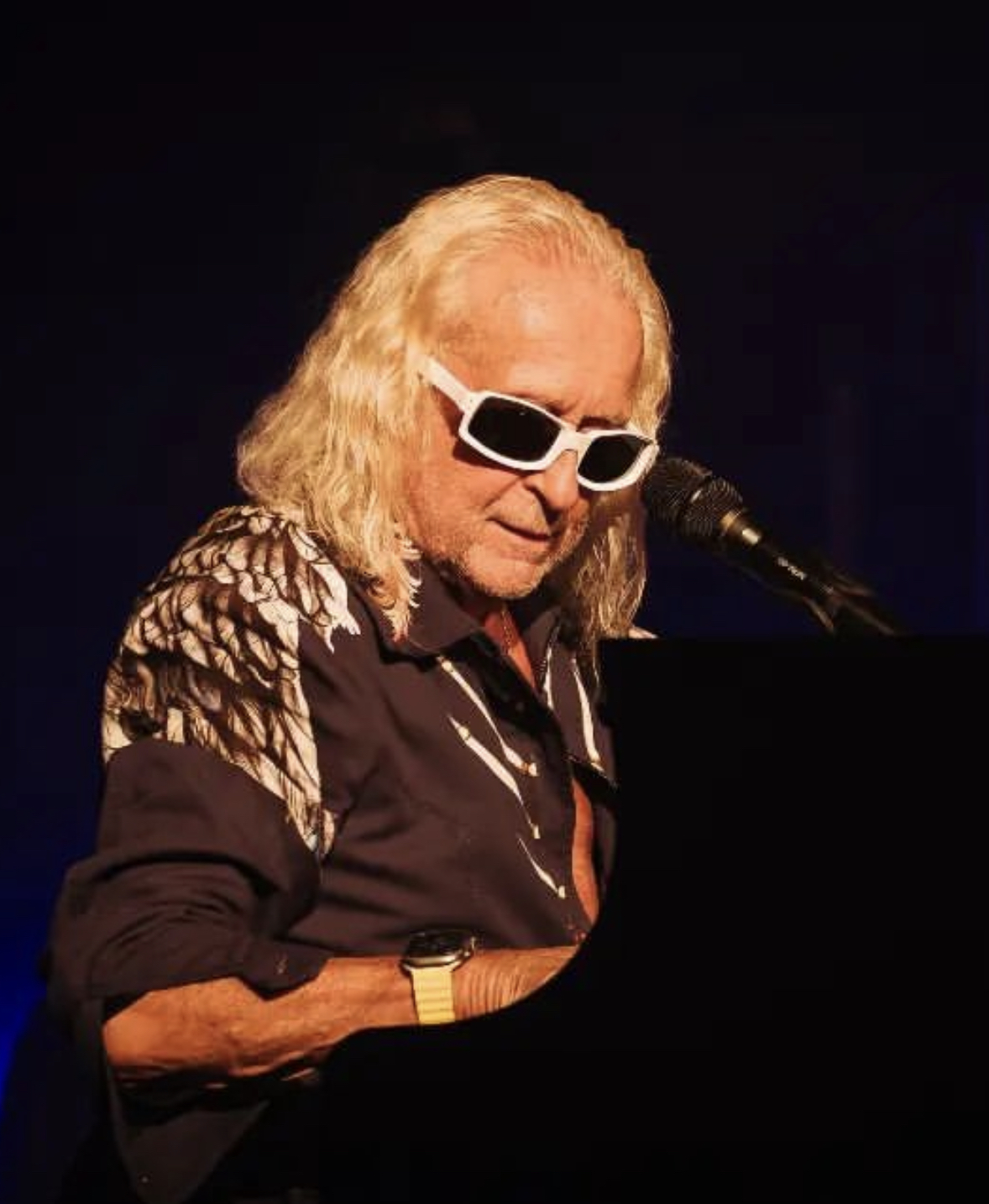
- Polnareff in concert at Le Palace in 2023

Background information
- Also known as: The Admiral
- Born: Michel Polnareff; 3 July 1944 (age 82)
- Origin: Nérac, France
- Genres: Pop; jazz rock
- Occupation: Singer-songwriter
- Instrument: Vocals
- Years active: 1966–present
- Label: Barclay
- Partner: Danyellah Polnareff (2004–present)

Michel Polnareff (born 3 July 1944) is a French singer-songwriter. He was mostly active in the 1960s, and remained so in France until the 1990s. Popular songs of his include "La Poupée qui fait non" and Love Me, Please Love Me, which incorporate elements of pop and rock. He is known for his stage persona and theatrical stage performances and is referenced in discussions of French popular music.

== Early life and education ==
Michel Polnareff was born on 3 July 1944 in Nérac, Lot-et-Garonne. His mother, Simonne Lane (1912-1973), was a Breton dancer who was born in Lennon, and his father, Leib Polnareff (1899-1988), also known as Léo Poll, was a Ukrainian Jewish composer and pianist born in Odesa. He performed with artists such as Édith Piaf.

Polnareff studied at the Conservatoire de Paris, as well as the Cours Hattemer private school. He studied piano from the age of four, later learning how to play the guitar. After completing his mandatory military service in France, Polnareff held brief positions in banking and insurance roles.

After being kicked out by his father at 18, Polnareff took up street performing, busking on the steps of Sacré-Cœur in Paris, at which point he began to garner attention for his musical talent.

== Career ==
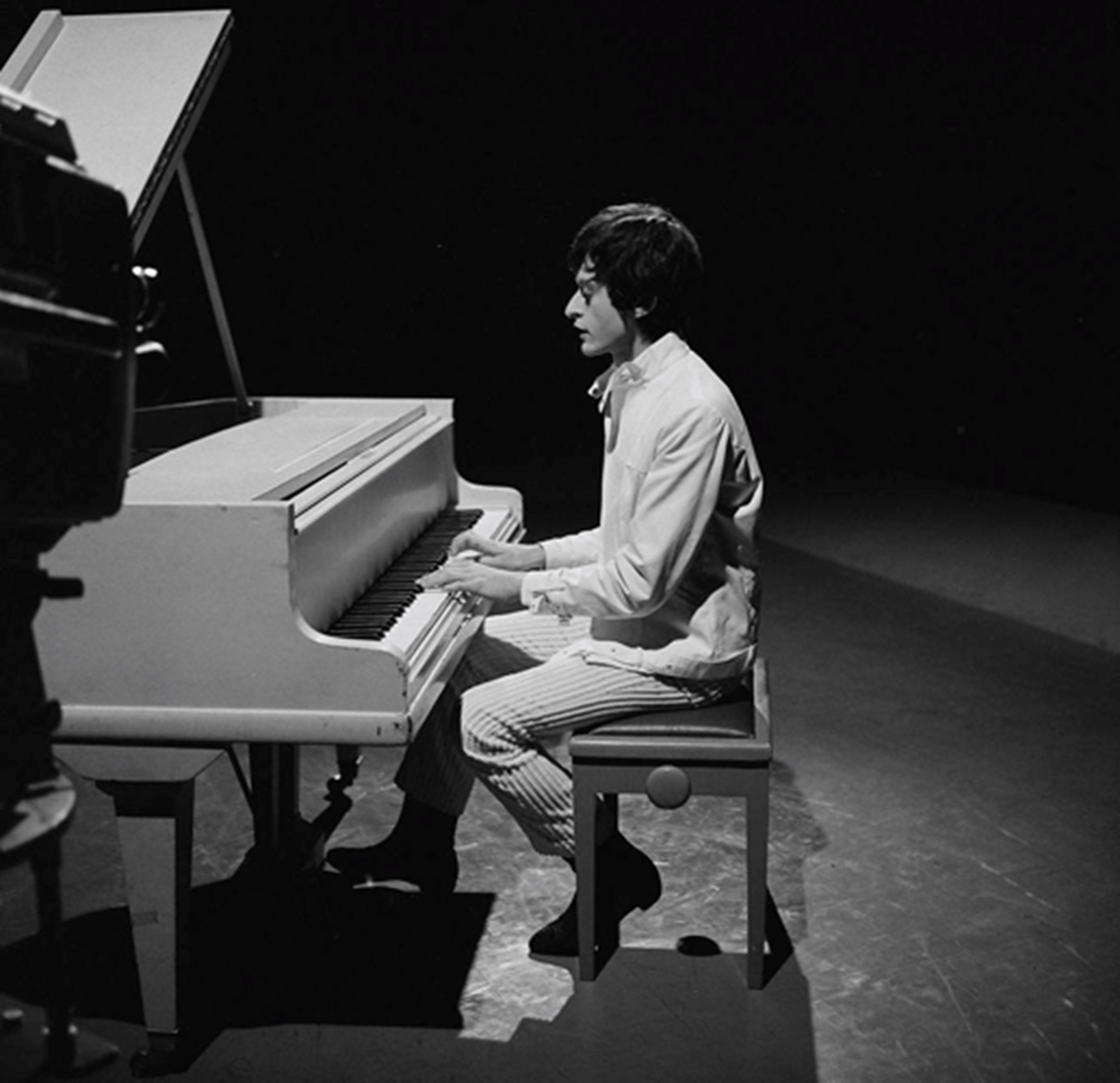
Polnareff on the Dutch TV program Fanclub, 1967

In 1966, producer Lucien Morisse signed Polnareff to Disc AZ. His first track, "La Poupée qui fait non", featured session guitarist Jimmy Page. He also released Love Me, Please Love Me in 1966.

=== United States (1973–1984) ===
In the early 1970s, Polnareff experienced several personal and professional setbacks. In May 1970, he was violently attacked on stage at Périgueux, in the Dordogne region, cutting short his planned summer tour, and in September, his close friend and mentor, Lucien Morisse, died by suicide. By 1973, Polnareff was experiencing severe financial difficulties. It was revealed that his business manager, Bernard Seneau, had been stealing from him, and as a result, he was unable to pay his taxes.

He moved to California, where he lived largely outside public attention. He was later joined there by his manager and romantic partner, Annie Fargé. His only English-language album, Fame à la Mode (alternately titled Michel Polnareff), was released in 1975. It included contributions from several American session musicians. The single "Jesus for Tonite" later appeared on the Billboard charts.

He composed the soundtrack for the film Lipstick (1976), which was released as an album in July 1976 on Atlantic Records. It reached number one on the U.S. disco charts and sold around 75,000 copies in France. At the time, he could not return to France and performed in Brussels. In 1977, he released "Lettre à France", co‑written with Jean‑Loup Dabadie, which sold roughly 476,000 copies that year. He had two albums which marked his return to the French charts: Coucou me Revoilou (1978) and Bulles (1981). Four years later, he released Incognito (1985), which received much less attention.

=== Return to France (1989–1994) ===
In 1989, the single "Goodbye Marylou" was released to radio stations. During the following 18 months, Polnareff resided at the Royal Monceau hotel in Paris while working on the album Kama-Sutra with Mike Oldfield featured as a guest musician on two tracks. The album was released in February 1990 to commercial success.

=== From the Roxy to Bercy: Rebirth (1995–2007) ===
Polnareff returned to live performance in 1995 with a concert at the Roxy Theatre in Los Angeles followed by a series of television appearances in France documenting his return to public performance. These events preceded the release of the live album Live at the Roxy, which achieved commercial success in France. In 1999, Polnareff released "Je rêve d'un monde (When I'm in Love)", his first original single in ten years; it received limited promotion and radio airplay and reached only moderate chart positions. Plans for a subsequent album and tour were announced but did not come to fruition in the following years.

In 2003, the compilation Passé Présent was released and sold approximately 400,000 copies. In 2004, Polnareff published his autobiography, Polnareff par Polnareff, and mentioned that he was working on a new album. On 12 May 2006, Polnareff announced on national television that he would perform a series of concerts from 2 to 14 March 2007, followed by a tour in France. He later released the single "Ophélie Flagrant des Lits", which received mixed critical reception. On 14 July 2007, Michel Polnareff performed a free concert at the Champ de Mars near the Eiffel Tower, which was reportedly attended by over 600,000 people.

=== In the Studio (2010–2015) ===
By November 2013, Polnareff had sold approximately 3.9 million albums and 4.9 million singles in France.

In 2014, an authorized documentary titled Quand l'écran s'allume (named after the opening line of "Goodbye Marylou") was released in selected cinemas and later broadcast on television. The film documented Polnareff's studio work and included previews of material from an upcoming album.

=== New Single and New Tour (2015–2017) ===
On 8 December 2015, Polnareff announced plans to release a new album and undertake a major concert tour across France, Belgium, and Switzerland during 2016. On 18 December 2015, Polnareff released a Christmas song titled "L'Homme en rouge", his first single since 2006, as a digital download and on streaming platforms.

In 2016, Polnareff indicated that work on his forthcoming album was ongoing and referenced several new compositions, including songs inspired by personal experiences and family life. At the same time, he released another autobiographical book entitled Spèrme. In December 2016, before the tour's penultimate concert, Polnareff was hospitalized with a double pulmonary embolism. He subsequently cancelled the final two shows.

=== 2018–present ===
On 3 October 2018, Michel Polnareff announced that his album Enfin! would be released on 30 November, marking his first studio album in 28 years. The album received mixed critical reception. On 24 July 2022, four years after the release of Enfin!, Polnareff announced Polnareff chante Polnareff, a piano-and-vocal album featuring new versions of his earlier songs. The album was followed by a concert tour in 2023.

In November 2024, Polnareff announced a new studio album and a 2025 tour, including a performance at the Eventim Apollo in London on 3 April 2025. He released the single "Sexcetera" later that month, followed by a second single, "Tu n'm'entends pas", in February 2025. The album titled Un temps pour elles, was released on 25 April 2025 and debuted in the French top ten.

== Personal life ==
In September 1970, Polnareff's friend, Lucien Morisse, died by suicide. After resting near Paris and undergoing months of isolation and therapy for depression, he gradually returned to touring.

In October 1972, around 6,000 promotional posters for his "Polnarévolution" tour were displayed around Paris, featuring an image of his bare buttocks. This caused controversy and led to legal issues. He was subsequently charged 10 francs for each poster put up, adding up to a 60,000 franc fine.

Polnareff has had relationships with American actress Lynda Carter and Dutch actress Sylvia Kristel. His first major relationship was with his manager, Annie Fargé, lasting over 20 years.

In 2004, he met Danyellah, a French journalist and model. On 28 December 2010, Danyellah gave birth to a boy, Louka, in Los Angeles. On 21 February 2011, Polnareff announced via Facebook that a DNA test revealed he was not the biological father and that Danyellah had used a sperm donor. A later post indicated his girlfriend had disappeared with the baby. After some months of separation, Polnareff was reunited with his son, Louka, in 2014. They now live in Palm Springs, where Polnareff has his own recording studio.

== Publications ==
- 1974: Polnaréflexions, in collaboration with Jean-Michel Desjeunes, Editions Dire/Stock2
- 2004: Polnareff par Polnareff, in collaboration with Philippe Manœuvre, Editions Grasset et Fasquelle
- 2013: Le Polnabook, by Michel Polnareff, Editions Ipanéma
- 2016: Spèrme, by Michel Polnareff, Editions Plon

== Bibliography ==
- Christian Eudeline, Derrière les lunettes, ed. Fayard, 2013 (ISBN 978-2-213-66680-8)
- Benoît Cachi, Polnaculte: Michel Polnareff vu par ses auteurs et par lui-même, ed. Tournon, 2007 (ISBN 978-2351440360)
- Christophe Lauga, Polnareff mania, ed. Scali, 2007 (ISBN 2350120848)
- Fabien Lecœuvre, Polnareff, la véritable histoire d'une légende, ed. City, 2007 (ISBN 2352880459)
- Philippe Margotin, Polnareff, ed. de la Lagune, 2007 (ISBN 284969049X)
- Fabien Lecœuvre, Michel Polnareff, ed. Vaderetro, 2004 (ISBN 2847630104)
