= List of Brit Awards ceremonies =

This article lists the presenters, venues and winners for the Brit Awards from 1977, 1982 to the present day, which includes the 1977 Silver Jubilee awards presentation.

== 2026 ==
Host(s): Jack Whitehall (Main)
Venue: Co-op Live
Broadcaster: ITV

== 2025 ==
Host(s): Jack Whitehall (Main)
Venue: The O2 Arena
Broadcaster: ITV

== 2024 ==
Host(s): Clara Amfo, Maya Jama and Roman Kemp (Main)
Venue: The O2 Arena
Broadcaster: ITV

== 2023 ==
Host(s): Mo Gilligan (Main)
Venue: The O2 Arena
Broadcaster: ITV

== 2022 ==
Host(s): Mo Gilligan (Main); Clara Amfo and Maya Jama (Launch)
Venue: The O2 Arena
Broadcaster: ITV

== 2021 ==
Host(s): Jack Whitehall (Main); Nick Grimshaw and Griff (Launch)
Venue: The O2 Arena
Broadcaster: ITV

- British Album of the Year: Dua Lipa – Future Nostalgia
- British Single of the Year: Harry Styles – "Watermelon Sugar"
- British Male Solo Artist: J Hus
- British Female Solo Artist: Dua Lipa
- British Group: Little Mix
- British Breakthrough Act: Arlo Parks
- International Male Solo Artist: The Weeknd
- International Female Solo Artist: Billie Eilish
- International Group: HAIM
- Rising Star Award: Griff
- Icon Award : Taylor Swift

== 2020 ==
Host(s): Jack Whitehall (Main); Alice Levine (Launch)
Venue: The O2 Arena
Broadcaster: ITV

- British Album of the Year: Dave – Psychodrama
- Song of the Year: Lewis Capaldi – "Someone You Loved"
- Rising Star Award: Celeste
- British Male Solo Artist: Stormzy
- British Female Solo Artist: Mabel
- British Group: Foals
- Best New Artist: Lewis Capaldi
- International Male Solo Artist: Tyler, the Creator
- International Female Solo Artist: Billie Eilish
- British Producer of the Year: Fred Again

== 2019 ==
Host(s): Jack Whitehall (Main); Clara Amfo (Launch)
Venue: The O2 Arena
Broadcaster: ITV

- British Album of the Year: The 1975 – A Brief Inquiry into Online Relationships
- British Producer of the Year: Calvin Harris
- British Single of the Year: Calvin Harris and Dua Lipa – "One Kiss"
- British Video of the Year: Little Mix featuring Nicki Minaj – "Woman Like Me"
- British Male Solo Artist: George Ezra
- British Female Solo Artist: Jorja Smith
- British Group: The 1975
- British Breakthrough Act: Tom Walker
- International Male Solo Artist: Drake
- International Female Solo Artist: Ariana Grande
- International Group: The Carters
- Critics' Choice Award: Sam Fender
- Global Success Award: Ed Sheeran
- Outstanding Contribution to Music: Pink

== 2018 ==
Host(s): Jack Whitehall (Main); Emma Willis (Launch)
Venue: The O2 Arena
Broadcaster: ITV

- British Album of the Year: Stormzy – Gang Signs & Prayer
- British Single of the Year: Rag'n'Bone Man – "Human"
- British Video of the Year: Harry Styles – "Sign Of The Times"
- British Producer of the Year: Steve Mac
- British Breakthrough Act: Dua Lipa
- British Male Solo Artist: Stormzy
- British Female Solo Artist: Dua Lipa
- British Group: Gorillaz
- International Male Solo Artist: Kendrick Lamar
- International Female Solo Artist: Lorde
- International Group: Foo Fighters
- Critics' Choice Award: Jorja Smith
- Global Success Award: Ed Sheeran

== 2017 ==
Host(s): Dermot O'Leary and Emma Willis (Main); Emma Willis (Launch)
Venue: O2 Arena
Broadcaster: ITV

- MasterCard British Album of the Year: David Bowie – Blackstar
- British Single of the Year: Little Mix – "Shout Out to My Ex"
- British Video: One Direction – "History"
- British Breakthrough Act: Rag'n'Bone Man
- British Female Solo Artist: Emeli Sandé
- British Male Solo Artist: David Bowie
- British Group: The 1975
- International Female Solo Artist: Beyoncé
- International Male Solo Artist: Drake
- International Group: A Tribe Called Quest
- Critics' Choice: Rag'n'Bone Man
- Global Success: Adele
- British Icon: Robbie Williams

== 2016 ==
Host(s): Ant & Dec (Main); Laura Whitmore (Launch)
Venue: O2 Arena
Broadcaster: ITV

- MasterCard British Album of the Year: Adele – 25
- British Single of the Year: Adele – "Hello"
- British Video of the Year: One Direction – "Drag Me Down"
- British Breakthrough Act: Catfish and the Bottlemen
- British Female Solo Artist: Adele
- British Male Solo Artist: James Bay
- British Group: Coldplay
- British Producer of the Year: Charlie Andrew
- International Female Solo Artist: Björk
- International Male Solo Artist: Justin Bieber
- International Group: Tame Impala
- Critics' Choice Award: Jack Garratt
- Global Success Award: Adele
- Icon Award: David Bowie

== 2015 ==
Host(s): Ant & Dec (Main); Reggie Yates (Launch)
Venue: O2 Arena
Broadcaster: ITV

- MasterCard British Album of the Year: Ed Sheeran – x
- British Single of the Year: Mark Ronson feat. Bruno Mars – "Uptown Funk"
- British Video of the Year: One Direction – "You & I"
- British Breakthrough Act: Sam Smith
- British Female Solo Artist: Paloma Faith
- British Male Solo Artist: Ed Sheeran
- British Group: Royal Blood
- British Producer of the Year: Paul Epworth
- International Female Solo Artist: Taylor Swift
- International Male Solo Artist: Pharrell Williams
- International Group: Foo Fighters
- Critics' Choice Award: James Bay
- Global Success Award: Sam Smith

== 2014 ==
Host(s): James Corden (Main); Nick Grimshaw (Launch)
Venue: O2 Arena
Broadcaster: ITV

- British Album of the Year: Arctic Monkeys – AM
- British Producer of the Year: Flood & Alan Moulder
- British Single of the Year: Rudimental – "Waiting All Night"
- British Video of the Year: One Direction – "Best Song Ever"
- British Breakthrough Act: Bastille
- British Female Solo Artist: Ellie Goulding
- British Male Solo Artist: David Bowie
- British Group: Arctic Monkeys
- International Female Solo Artist: Lorde
- International Male Solo Artist: Bruno Mars
- International Group: Daft Punk
- Critics' Choice Award: Sam Smith
- Global Success Award: One Direction
- Icon Award: Elton John

== 2013 ==
Host(s): James Corden
Venue: O2 Arena
Broadcaster: ITV

- MasterCard British Album of the Year: Emeli Sandé – Our Version of Events
- British Single of the Year: Adele – "Skyfall"
- British Breakthrough Act: Ben Howard
- British Female Solo Artist: Emeli Sandé
- British Male Solo Artist: Ben Howard
- British Group: Mumford & Sons
- British Live Act: Coldplay
- British Producer of the Year: Paul Epworth
- International Female Solo Artist: Lana Del Rey
- International Male Solo Artist: Frank Ocean
- International Group: The Black Keys
- Critics' Choice: Tom Odell
- Global Success: One Direction
- Special Recognition: War Child

== 2012 ==
Host(s): James Corden
Venue: O2 Arena
Broadcaster: ITV

- MasterCard British Album of the Year: Adele – 21
- British Single of the Year: One Direction – "What Makes You Beautiful"
- British Breakthrough Act: Ed Sheeran
- British Female Solo Artist: Adele
- British Male Solo Artist: Ed Sheeran
- British Group: Coldplay
- British Producer of the Year: Ethan Johns
- International Breakthrough Act: Lana Del Rey
- International Female Solo Artist: Rihanna
- International Male Solo Artist: Bruno Mars
- International Group: Foo Fighters
- Critics' Choice: Emeli Sandé
- Outstanding Contribution to Music: Blur

== 2011 ==
Host(s): James Corden
Venue: O2 Arena
Broadcaster: ITV

- MasterCard British Album of the Year: Mumford & Sons – Sigh No More
- British Single of the Year: Tinie Tempah – "Pass Out"
- British Breakthrough Act: Tinie Tempah
- British Female Solo Artist: Laura Marling
- British Male Solo Artist: Plan B
- British Group: Take That
- British Producer of the Year: Markus Dravs
- International Album: Arcade Fire- The Suburbs
- International Breakthrough Act: Justin Bieber
- International Female Solo Artist: Rihanna
- International Male Solo Artist: CeeLo Green
- International Group: Arcade Fire
- Critics' Choice: Jessie J

== 2010 ==
Host(s): Peter Kay
Venue: Earls Court
Broadcaster: ITV

- British Album of the Year: Florence and the Machine – Lungs
- British Producer of the Year: Paul Epworth
- British Single of the Year: JLS – "Beat Again"
- British Breakthrough Act: JLS
- British Female Solo Artist: Lily Allen
- British Male Solo Artist: Dizzee Rascal
- British Group: Kasabian
- International Album: Lady Gaga – The Fame
- International Breakthrough Act: Lady Gaga
- International Female Solo Artist: Lady Gaga
- International Male Solo Artist: Jay Z
- Critics' Choice: Ellie Goulding
- Outstanding Contribution to Music: Robbie Williams
- Live Performance at the Brit Awards: Spice Girls – "Wannabe" / "Who Do You Think You Are"
- British Album of 30 Year: Oasis – (What's the Story) Morning Glory?

== 2009 ==
Host(s): Kylie Minogue, James Corden and Mathew Horne
Venue: Earls Court
Broadcaster: ITV

- British Album of the Year: Duffy – Rockferry
- British Single of the Year: Girls Aloud – "The Promise"
- British Breakthrough Act: Duffy
- British Female Solo Artist: Duffy
- British Male Solo Artist: Paul Weller
- British Group: Elbow
- British Live Act: Iron Maiden
- British Producer of the Year: Bernard Butler
- International Album: Kings of Leon – Only By The Night
- International Female Solo Artist: Katy Perry
- International Male Solo Artist: Kanye West
- International Group: Kings of Leon
- Critics' Choice: Florence and the Machine
- Outstanding Contribution to Music: Pet Shop Boys

== 2008 ==
Host(s): The Osbournes
Venue: Earls Court
Broadcaster: ITV

- British Album of the Year: Arctic Monkeys – Favourite Worst Nightmare
- British Single of the Year: Take That – "Shine"
- British Breakthrough Act: Mika
- British Female Solo Artist: Kate Nash
- British Male Solo Artist: Mark Ronson
- British Group: Arctic Monkeys
- British Live Act: Take That
- International Album: Foo Fighters – Echoes, Silence, Patience & Grace
- International Female Solo Artist: Kylie Minogue
- International Male Solo Artist: Kanye West
- International Group: Foo Fighters
- Critics' Choice: Adele
- Outstanding Contribution to Music: Paul McCartney

== 2007 ==
Host(s): Russell Brand
Venue: Earls Court
Broadcaster: ITV

- British Album of the Year: Arctic Monkeys – Whatever People Say I Am, That's What I'm Not
- British Single of the Year: Take That – "Patience"
- British Breakthrough Act: The Fratellis
- British Male Solo Artist: James Morrison
- British Female Solo Artist: Amy Winehouse
- British Group: Arctic Monkeys
- British Live Act: Muse
- International Album: The Killers – "Sam's Town"
- International Breakthrough Act: Orson
- International Female Solo Artist: Nelly Furtado
- International Male Solo Artist: Justin Timberlake
- International Group: The Killers
- Outstanding Contribution to Music: Oasis

== 2006 ==
Host(s): Chris Evans
Venue: Earls Court
Broadcaster: ITV

- British Album of the Year: Coldplay – X&Y
- British Single of the Year: Coldplay – "Speed of Sound"
- British Breakthrough Act: Arctic Monkeys
- British Female Solo Artist: KT Tunstall
- British Male Solo Artist: James Blunt
- British Group: Kaiser Chiefs
- British Live Act: Kaiser Chiefs
- British Rock Act: Kaiser Chiefs
- British Urban Act: Lemar
- Best Pop Act: James Blunt
- International Album: Green Day – American Idiot
- International Breakthrough Act: Jack Johnson
- International Female Solo Artist: Madonna
- International Male Solo Artist: Kanye West
- International Group: Green Day
- Outstanding Contribution to Music: Paul Weller

== 2005 ==
Host(s): Chris Evans
Venue: Earls Court
Broadcaster: ITV

- British Album of the Year: Keane – Hopes and Fears
- British Single of the Year: Will Young – "Your Game"
- British Breakthrough Act: Keane
- British Female Solo Artist: Joss Stone
- British Male Solo Artist: The Streets
- British Group: Franz Ferdinand
- British Live Act: Muse
- British Rock Act: Franz Ferdinand
- British Urban Act: Joss Stone
- Best Pop Act: McFly
- International Album: Scissor Sisters – Scissor Sisters
- International Breakthrough Act: Scissor Sisters
- International Female Solo Artist: Gwen Stefani
- International Male Solo Artist: Eminem
- International Group: Scissor Sisters
- British 25 Year Best Song Award: Robbie Williams – "Angels"
- Outstanding Contribution to Music: Bob Geldof

== 2004 ==
Host(s): Cat Deeley
Venue: Earls Court
Broadcaster: ITV

- British Album of the Year: The Darkness – Permission to Land
- British Single of the Year: Dido – "White Flag"
- British Breakthrough Act: Busted
- British Female Solo Artist: Dido
- British Male Solo artist: Daniel Bedingfield
- British Group: The Darkness
- British Dance Act: Basement Jaxx
- British Rock Act: The Darkness
- British Urban Act: Lemar
- Best Pop Act: Busted
- International Album: Justin Timberlake – Justified
- International Breakthrough Act: 50 Cent
- International Female Solo Artist: Beyoncé
- International Male Solo Artist: Justin Timberlake
- International Group: The White Stripes
- Outstanding Contribution to Music: Duran Duran

== 2003 ==
Host(s): Davina McCall
Venue: Earls Court

- British Album of the Year: Coldplay – A Rush of Blood to the Head
- British Single of the Year: Liberty X – "Just a Little"
- British Breakthrough Act: Will Young
- British Female Solo Artist: Ms. Dynamite
- British Male Solo Artist: Robbie Williams
- British Group: Coldplay
- British Dance Act: Sugababes
- British Urban Act: Ms. Dynamite
- Best Pop Act: Blue
- International Album: Eminem – "The Eminem Show"
- International Breakthrough Act: Norah Jones
- International Female Solo Artist: Pink
- International Male Solo Artist: Eminem
- International Group: Red Hot Chili Peppers
- Outstanding Contribution to Music: Tom Jones

== 2002 ==
Host(s): Frank Skinner and Zoe Ball
Venue: Earls Court

- British Album of the Year: Dido – No Angel
- British Single of the Year: S Club 7 – "Don't Stop Movin'"
- British Video: So Solid Crew – "21 Seconds"
- British Breakthrough Act: Blue
- British Female Solo Artist: Dido
- British Male Solo Artist: Robbie Williams
- British Group: Travis
- British Dance Act: Basement Jaxx
- Best Pop Act: Westlife
- International Album: Kylie Minogue – Fever
- International Breakthrough Act: The Strokes
- International Female Solo Artist: Kylie Minogue
- International Male Solo Artist: Shaggy
- International Group: Destiny's Child
- Outstanding Contribution to Music: Sting

== 2001 ==
Host(s): Ant & Dec
Venue: Earls Court

- British Album of the Year: Coldplay – Parachutes
- British Single of the Year: Robbie Williams – "Rock DJ"
- British Video: Robbie Williams – "Rock DJ"
- British Breakthrough Act: a1
- British Female Solo Artist: Sonique
- British Male Solo Artist: Robbie Williams
- British Group: Coldplay
- British Dance Act: Fatboy Slim
- Best Soundtrack/Cast Recording: American Beauty
- Best Pop Act: Westlife
- International Breakthrough Act: Kelis
- International Female Solo Artist: Madonna
- International Male Solo Artist: Eminem
- International Group: U2
- Outstanding Contribution to Music: U2

== 2000 ==
Host(s): Davina McCall
Venue: Earls Court

- British Album of the Year: Travis – The Man Who
- British Single of the Year: Robbie Williams – "She's the One"
- British Video: Robbie Williams – "She's the One"
- British Breakthrough Act: S Club 7
- British Female Solo Artist: Beth Orton
- British Male Solo Artist: Tom Jones
- British Group: Travis
- British Dance Act: The Chemical Brothers
- Best Soundtrack/Cast Recording: Notting Hill
- Best Selling Live Act: Steps
- Best Pop Act: Five
- International Breakthrough Act: Macy Gray
- International Female Solo Artist: Macy Gray
- International Male Solo Artist: Beck
- International Group: TLC
- Outstanding Contribution to Music: Spice Girls

== 1999 ==
Host(s): Johnny Vaughan
Venue: London Arena

- British Album of the Year: Manic Street Preachers – This Is My Truth Tell Me Yours
- British Single of the Year: Robbie Williams – "Angels"
- British Video: Robbie Williams – "Millennium"
- British Breakthrough Act: Belle & Sebastian
- British Female Solo Artist: Des'ree
- British Male Solo Artist: Robbie Williams
- British Group: Manic Street Preachers
- British Dance Act: Fatboy Slim
- Best Soundtrack/Cast Recording: Titanic
- International Breakthrough Act: Natalie Imbruglia
- International Female Solo Artist: Natalie Imbruglia
- International Male Solo Artist: Beck
- International Group: The Corrs
- Outstanding Contribution to Music: Eurythmics

== 1998 ==
Host(s): Ben Elton
Venue: London Arena

- British Album of the Year: The Verve – Urban Hymns
- British Single of the Year: All Saints – "Never Ever"
- British Video: All Saints – "Never Ever"
- British Breakthrough Act: Stereophonics
- British Female Solo Artist: Shola Ama
- British Male Solo Artist: Finley Quaye
- British Group: The Verve
- British Dance Act: The Prodigy
- British Producer of the Year: The Verve, Chris Potter and Youth
- Best Soundtrack/Cast Recording: The Full Monty
- Best Selling British Album Act: Spice Girls (for the albums: Spice and Spiceworld)
- International Breakthrough Act: Eels
- International Female Solo Artist: Björk
- International Male Solo Artist: Jon Bon Jovi
- International Group: U2
- Freddie Mercury Award: Sir Elton John
- Outstanding Contribution to Music: Fleetwood Mac

== 1997 ==
Host(s): Ben Elton
Venue: Earls Court

- British Album of the Year: Manic Street Preachers – Everything Must Go
- British Single of the Year: Spice Girls – "Wannabe"
- British Video: Spice Girls – "Say You'll Be There"
- British Breakthrough Act: Kula Shaker
- British Female Solo Artist: Gabrielle
- British Male Solo Artist: George Michael
- British Group: Manic Street Preachers
- British Dance Act: The Prodigy
- British Producer of the Year: John Leckie
- Best Soundtrack/Cast Recording: Trainspotting
- International Breakthrough Act: Robert Miles
- International Female Solo Artist: Sheryl Crow
- International Male Solo Artist: Beck
- International Group: The Fugees
- Outstanding Contribution to Music: Bee Gees

== 1996 ==
Host(s): Chris Evans
Venue: Earls Court

- British Album of the Year: Oasis – (What's the Story) Morning Glory
- British Single of the Year: Take That – "Back for Good"
- British Video: Oasis – "Wonderwall"
- British Breakthrough Act: Supergrass
- British Female Solo Artist: Annie Lennox
- British Male Solo Artist: Paul Weller
- British Group: Oasis
- British Dance Act: Massive Attack
- British Producer of the Year: Brian Eno
- Best Soundtrack/Cast Recording: Batman Forever
- International Breakthrough Act: Alanis Morissette
- International Female Solo Artist: Björk
- International Male Solo Artist: Prince
- International Group: Bon Jovi
- Artist of a Generation: Michael Jackson
- Freddie Mercury Award: The Help Album for the Charity Warchild
- Outstanding Contribution to Music: David Bowie

== 1995 ==
Host(s): Chris Evans
Venue: Alexandra Palace

- British Album of the Year: Blur: Parklife
- British Single of the Year: Blur – "Parklife"
- British Video: Blur – "Parklife"
- British Breakthrough Act: Oasis
- British Female Solo Artist: Eddi Reader
- British Male Solo Artist: Paul Weller
- British Group: Blur
- British Dance Act: M People
- British Producer of the Year: Nellee Hooper
- Best Soundtrack/Cast Recording: Pulp Fiction
- International Breakthrough Act: Lisa Loeb
- International Female Solo Artist: k.d. lang
- International Male Solo Artist: Prince
- International Group: R.E.M.
- Outstanding Contribution to Music: Elton John

== 1994 ==
Host(s): Rupaul and Elton John
Venue: Alexandra Palace

- British Album of the Year: Stereo MC's – Connected
- British Single of the Year: Take That – "Pray"
- British Video: Take That – "Pray"
- British Breakthrough Act: Gabrielle
- British Female Solo Artist: Dina Carroll
- British Male Solo Artist: Sting
- British Group: Stereo MC's
- British Dance Act: M People
- British Producer of the Year: Brian Eno
- Best Selling Album & Single: Meat Loaf
- Best Soundtrack/Cast Recording: The Bodyguard
- International Breakthrough Act: Björk
- International Female Solo Artist: Björk
- International Male Solo Artist: Lenny Kravitz
- International Group: Crowded House
- Outstanding Contribution to Music: Van Morrison

== 1993 ==
Host(s): Richard O'Brien
Venue: Alexandra Palace

- British Album of the Year: Annie Lennox – Diva
- British Single of the Year: Take That – "Could It Be Magic"
- British Video: Shakespear's Sister – "Stay"
- British Breakthrough Act: Tasmin Archer
- British Female Solo Artist – Annie Lennox
- British Male Solo Artist: Mick Hucknall
- British Group: Simply Red
- British Producer of the Year: Peter Gabriel
- Best Classical Recording: Nigel Kennedy
- Best Soundtrack/Cast Recording: Wayne's World
- International Breakthrough Act: Nirvana
- International Solo Artist (Female or Male): Prince
- International Group: R.E.M.
- Most Successful Live Act: U2
- Outstanding Contribution to Music: Rod Stewart

== 1992 ==
Host(s): Simon Bates
Venue: Hammersmith Odeon

- British Album of the Year: Seal – Seal (1991)
- British Single of the Year: Queen – "These Are the Days of Our Lives"
- British Video: Seal – "Killer"
- British Breakthrough Act: Beverley Craven
- British Female Solo Artist: Lisa Stansfield
- British Male Solo Artist: Seal
- British Group: The KLF and Simply Red (Joint Winners)
- British Producer of the Year: Trevor Horn
- Best Classical Recording: Giuseppe Verdi – (Sir Georg Solti) – "Otello"
- Best Soundtrack/Cast Recording: The Commitments
- International Breakthrough Act: P. M. Dawn
- International Solo Artist (Female or Male): Prince
- International Group: R.E.M.
- Outstanding Contribution to Music: Freddie Mercury

== 1991 ==
Host(s): Simon Bates
Venue: Dominion Theatre

- British Album of the Year: George Michael – Listen Without Prejudice
- British Single of the Year: Depeche Mode – "Enjoy the Silence"
- British Video: The Beautiful South – "A Little Time"
- British Breakthrough Act: Betty Boo
- British Female Solo Artist: Lisa Stansfield
- British Male Solo Artist: Elton John
- British Group: The Cure
- British Producer of the Year: Chris Thomas
- Best Classical Recording: José Carreras, Plácido Domingo, Luciano Pavarotti – In Concert
- Best Soundtrack/Cast Recording: Twin Peaks
- International Breakthrough Act: MC Hammer
- International Female Solo Artist: Sinéad O'Connor
- International Male Solo Artist: Michael Hutchence
- International Group: INXS
- Outstanding Contribution to Music: Status Quo

== 1990 ==
Host(s): Cathy McGowan
Venue: Dominion Theatre

- British Album of the Year: Fine Young Cannibals – The Raw and the Cooked
- British Single of the Year: Phil Collins – "Another Day in Paradise"
- British Video: The Cure – "Lullaby"
- British Breakthrough Act: Lisa Stansfield
- British Female Solo Artist: Annie Lennox
- British Male Solo Artist: Phil Collins
- British Group: Fine Young Cannibals
- British Producer of the Year: Dave Stewart
- Best Classical Recording: Simon Rattle – George Gershwin's – "Porgy and Bess"
- Best Soundtrack/Cast Recording: Batman
- International Breakthrough Act: Neneh Cherry
- International Solo Artist (Female or Male): Neneh Cherry
- International Group: U2
- Outstanding Contribution to Music: Queen

== 1989 ==
Host(s): Mick Fleetwood and Samantha Fox
Venue: Royal Albert Hall

- British Album of the Year: Fairground Attraction – The First of a Million Kisses
- British Single of the Year: Fairground Attraction – "Perfect"
- British Video: Michael Jackson – "Smooth Criminal"
- British Breakthrough Act: Bros
- British Female Solo Artist: Annie Lennox
- British Male Solo Artist: Phil Collins
- British Group: Erasure
- Best Classical Recording: George Frideric Handel's – Messiah
- Best Soundtrack/Cast Recording: Buster
- International Breakthrough Act: Tracy Chapman
- International Female Solo Artist: Tracy Chapman
- International Male Solo Artist: Michael Jackson
- International Group: U2
- Outstanding Contribution to Music: Cliff Richard

== 1988 ==
Host(s): Noel Edmonds
Venue: Royal Albert Hall

- British Album of the Year: Sting – ...Nothing Like the Sun
- British Single of the Year: Rick Astley – "Never Gonna Give You Up"
- British Video: New Order – "True Faith"
- British Breakthrough Act: Wet Wet Wet
- British Female Solo Artist: Alison Moyet
- British Male Solo Artist: George Michael
- British Group: Pet Shop Boys
- British Producer of the Year: Stock Aitken Waterman
- Best Classical Recording: Ralph Vaughan Williams – Symphony No. 5
- Best Soundtrack/Cast Recording: The Phantom of the Opera
- International Breakthrough Act: Terence Trent D'Arby
- International Solo Artist (Female or Male): Michael Jackson
- International Group: U2
- Outstanding Contribution to Music: The Who

== 1987 ==
Host(s): Jonathan King
Venue: Grosvenor Hotel

- British Album of the Year: Dire Straits – Brothers in Arms
- British Single of the Year: Pet Shop Boys – "West End Girls"
- British Video: Peter Gabriel – "Sledgehammer"
- British Breakthrough Act: The Housemartins
- British Female Solo Artist: Kate Bush
- British Male Solo Artist: Peter Gabriel
- British Group: Five Star
- British Producer of the Year: Dave Stewart
- Best Classical Recording: Julian Lloyd Webber/Royal Philharmonic Orchestra Edward Elgar Cello Concerto
- Best Soundtrack/Cast Recording: Top Gun
- International Solo Artist (Female or Male): – Paul Simon
- International Group: The Bangles
- Outstanding Contribution to Music: Eric Clapton

== 1986 ==
Host(s): Noel Edmonds
Venue: Grosvenor Hotel

- British Album of the Year: Phil Collins – No Jacket Required
- British Single of the Year: Tears for Fears – "Everybody Wants to Rule the World"
- British Video of the Year: Paul Young – "Everytime You Go Away"
- British Producer of the Year: Dave Stewart
- British Breakthrough Act: Go West
- British Female Solo Artist: Annie Lennox
- British Male Solo Artist: Phil Collins
- British Group: Dire Straits
- International Solo Artist (Female or Male): Bruce Springsteen
- International Group: Huey Lewis and the News
- Classical Recording: Nigel Kennedy
- Outstanding Contribution to Music: Wham! and Elton John (Joint Winners)

== 1985 ==
Host(s): Noel Edmonds
Venue: Grosvenor Hotel

- British Album of the Year: Sade – Diamond Life
- British Single of the Year: Frankie Goes to Hollywood – "Relax"
- British Video: Duran Duran – "The Wild Boys"
- British Breakthrough Act: Frankie Goes to Hollywood
- British Male Solo Artist: Paul Young
- British Female Solo Artist: Alison Moyet
- British Group: Wham!
- British Producer of the Year: Trevor Horn
- British Comedy Recording: Neil (also known as Nigel Planer) – "Hole in My Shoe"
- Best Classical Recording: Antonio Vivaldi's – The Four Seasons
- Best Soundtrack/Cast Recording: Purple Rain
- International Artist (Group or Solo): Prince & The Revolution
- Outstanding Contribution to Music: The Police
- Special Award: Bob Geldof and Midge Ure

== 1984 ==
Host(s): Tim Rice
Venue: Grosvenor Hotel

- British Breakthrough Act: Paul Young
- British Female Solo Artist: Annie Lennox
- British Male Solo Artist: David Bowie
- British Group: Culture Club
- British Producer of the Year: Steve Levine
- Best Classical Recording: Kiri Te Kanawa – Songs of the Auvergne
- Best Selling Album: Michael Jackson – Thriller
- Best Selling Single: Culture Club – "Karma Chameleon"
- International Artist (Group or Solo): Michael Jackson
- Outstanding Contribution to Music: George Martin
- Sony Trophy Award for Technical Excellence: Spandau Ballet

== 1983 ==
Host(s): Tim Rice
Venue: Grosvenor Hotel

- British Breakthrough Act: Yazoo
- British Male Solo Artist: Paul McCartney
- British Female Solo Artist: Kim Wilde
- British Group: Dire Straits
- British Producer of the Year: Trevor Horn
- British Classical Recording: John Williams – Portrait Of John Williams
- International Artist (Group or Solo): Kid Creole and the Coconuts
- Best Selling Album: Barbra Streisand – Memories
- Best Selling Single: Dexys Midnight Runners – "Come On Eileen"
- Special Award: Chris Wright
- Sony Trophy Award for Technical Excellence: Paul McCartney
- Lifetime Achievement Award: Pete Townshend
- Outstanding Contribution to Music: The Beatles

== 1982 ==
Host(s): David Jacobs
Venue: Grosvenor Hotel

- British Album of the Year: Adam and the Ants – Kings of the Wild Frontier
- British Single of the Year: Soft Cell – "Tainted Love"
- British Breakthrough Act: The Human League
- British Female Solo Artist: Randy Crawford
- British Male Solo Artist: Cliff Richard
- British Group: The Police
- British Producer of the Year: Martin Rushent
- Best Classical Recording: Gustav Mahler's – Symphony No. 10
- Outstanding Contribution to Music: John Lennon

== 1977 ==
Host(s): Michael Aspel
Venue: Wembley Conference Centre

n.b. these awards were to mark the Queen's Silver Jubilee and were for the previous 25 years of her reign.

- British Album of the Year: The Beatles – Sgt. Pepper's Lonely Hearts Club Band
- British Single of the Year: Queen – "Bohemian Rhapsody" & Procol Harum – "A Whiter Shade of Pale" (Joint Winners)
- British Female Newcomer: Julie Covington
- British Male Newcomer: Graham Parker
- British Female Solo Artist: Shirley Bassey
- British Male Solo Artist: Cliff Richard
- British Group: The Beatles
- British Producer of the Year: George Martin
- British Non-Musical Recording: Richard Burton and Cast of Under Milk Wood
- Best Classical Soloist Album: Jacqueline du Pré – Edward Elgar Cello Concerto
- Best Orchestral Album: Benjamin Britten – War Requiem
- International Album: Simon & Garfunkel – Bridge over Troubled Water
- Outstanding Contribution to Music: The Beatles
