= Ay Fond Kiss =

Studio album by Fairground Attraction
- Released: 18 June 1990
- Recorded: January 1988 – December 1988
- Genres: Skiffle, folk, pop
- Length: 39:23
- Label: RCA
- Producer: Fairground Attraction

Fairground Attraction chronology
| The First of a Million Kisses (1988) | Ay Fond Kiss (1990) |

Singles from Fairground Attraction
- 1. "Walkin' After Midnight" Released: 14 May 1990

Professional ratings
Review scores
| Source | Rating |
|---|---|
| AllMusic | 2.5/5 stars |
| New Musical Express | 8/10 |
| Record Mirror | 3/5 stars |
| Select | 2/5 |

Ay Fond Kiss is the second album by British folk and soft rock band Fairground Attraction, released on 18 June 1990 by RCA Records. The title is a misspelling of the Robert Burns poem "Ae Fond Kiss", which lead singer Eddi Reader also covered on her 2003 album Sings the Songs of Robert Burns. The album consists mostly of unreleased recordings and B-sides to previously released singles and was released after Reader had left the group. It peaked at number 55 in the UK Albums Chart.

The album features cover versions of several songs, including Sam Cooke's "You Send Me" (which was previously released as the B-side to the group's hit single "Find My Love"), Donny Hathaway's "Tryin Times", Patsy Cline's "Walkin' After Midnight" and The Beatles "Do You Want to Know a Secret?" as well as Robert Burns "Ae Fond Kiss" and a few other traditional songs.

The only single to be released from the album was "Walkin' After Midnight", which peaked at number 97 on the UK Singles Chart.

== Background ==
Lead guitarist Mark E. Nevin has said of the album:

"On each of the Fairground Attraction singles we recorded 3 extra tracks as 'B-sides'. We felt that it was good value for money and also a good opportunity to record songs that we may not have put on albums.

Ay Fond Kiss is basically these B-sides, a live version of 'Allelujah' and the previously unreleased 'Cajun Band', a song written by our friend Anthony Thistlethwaite that we had recorded for a bit of fun during the 'First of a Million Kisses' sessions. We had wanted it to be a budget-priced album and clearly sold as that, but when we split up RCA put it out at full price with no indication that it wasn't in fact a 'proper' album (sneaky).

So if you bought this album thinking it was the follow-up to 'First of a Million Kisses' and were a bit disappointed then I apologise. That said, it is still a half decent record and has some really great moments, not least the title track. Eddi always had a great love and knowledge of traditional folk music and her rendition of Robbie Burns' 'Ay Fond Kiss' is worth the price of the album itself in my book. We recorded it in one take at Westside Studios in Hammersmith for inclusion on the 'Find My Love' cd single."

== Track listing ==
1. "Jock O'Hazeldean" (Traditional) – 3:05
2. "The Game of Love" (Mark E Nevin) – 3:23
3. "Walkin' After Midnight" (Alan Block / Don Hecht; Patsy Cline cover) – 2:48
4. "You Send Me" (Sam Cooke) – 4:41
5. "Tryin' Times" (Donny Hathaway / Leroy Hutson) – 3:52
6. "Mystery Train" (Junior Parker) – 1:58
7. "Winter Rose" (Nevin) – 3:29
8. "Do You Want to Know a Secret" (John Lennon / Paul McCartney) – 2:33
9. "Allelujah" (Nevin) – 3:33
10. "Cajun Band" (Anthony Thistlethwaite) – 3:01
11. "Watching the Party" (Nevin) – 3:31
12. "Ay Fond Kiss" (Robert Burns song/poem) – 3:19

== Personnel ==
=== Musicians ===
- Eddi Reader – vocals
- Roy Dodds – drums
- Mark E. Nevin – guitar
- Simon Edwards – guitarrón

=== Production ===
- Kevin Moloney – producer, mixing (tracks 1–8 and 10)
- Fairground Attraction – producer
- Mike Thornton – recording and mixing (track 9)

== Charts ==
Chart performance for Ay Fond Kiss
| Chart (1990) | Peak position |
|---|---|
| UK Albums (Official Charts) | 55 |
