= The Stellas (album) =

Studio album by The Stellas
- Released: September 6, 2011
- Genre: Country
- Label: EMI Music Canada
- Producer: Nick Trevisick

Singles from The Stellas
- 1. "Perfect" Released: June 28, 2011; 2. "In This House" Released: November 7, 2011; 3. "Riding in the Back Seat" Released: March 26, 2012

Professional ratings
Review scores
Source	Rating
Kelowna Capital News	B−

The Stellas is the only album by Canadian country music duo The Stellas. It was released on September 6, 2011, via EMI Music Canada. The Stellas wrote all of the songs on the album, except for a cover of Fairground Attraction's "Perfect" and a cover of The Everly Brothers' "Love Hurts" recorded live at Massey Hall.

== Critical reception ==
Bruce Mitchell of Kelowna Capital News gave the album a B−, writing that "this solid retro country album and their recent tour gigs prove they are real talents on the rise."

== Track listing ==
No.	Title	Length
1.	"Perfect"	3:00
2.	"I Can't Listen to Love Songs"	3:37
3.	"In This House"	3:57
4.	"Riding in the Back Seat"	3:20
5.	"The Game"	2:50
6.	"Woe Is Me"	2:55
7.	"Take It Slow"	2:55
8.	"I Wished for You"	3:36
9.	"Life of Riley"	3:48
10.	"Love Hurts" (live at Massey Hall)	3:00
Total length:		32:58
