= The Stellas =

Canadian country music duo

- Origin: Whitby, Ontario, Canada
- Genres: Country
- Years active: 2009–2015
- Label: EMI Music Canada
- Members: Brad Stella; MaryLynne Stella
- Website: Official website

The Stellas were a married Canadian country music duo from Whitby, Ontario. They finished in fourth place on the second season of the CMT series Can You Duet in 2009. Their self-titled debut album was released by EMI Music Canada in September 2011. The first single was a cover of the Fairground Attraction's song "Perfect". In July 2014, the duo released "Gravy", which doubles as the first single off their second album. An Irish rock and roll showband by the same name was active in the sixties releasing a single covering Wooly Bully and "Fortune Teller".

== Personal life ==
Brad and MaryLynne Penhalemet when they were age 20. The married couple has been together for sixteen years playing in bands and writing country pop music.

Brad played bass in rock bands for years, but was drawn to writing country. MaryLynne had never written songs until she met Brad. She grew up one of eight kids, which her late father supported as a musician (he was once a member of The Platters).

MaryLynne and Brad both performed in cover bands and hosted a weekly open mic where they eventually became a musical duo. The couple also opened a 15,000-square-foot music school, The Music Scene, which included a stage and auditorium.

Brad and MaryLynne have two daughters, Lennon and Maisy, who are known for their roles on the ABC show Nashville.

In 2009 the couple divorced.

== Career ==
In 2009, The Stellas tried out for the U.S. show Can You Duet, performing songs by Paul McCartney and Cyndi Lauper. Following their audition for the Country Music Television show, The Stellas performed weekly for millions of American viewers and earned fourth place in the competition. This led fellow Canadian and multi-platinum artist, Johnny Reid, to offer The Stellas the opening slot on his sold-out Canadian tour. Eventually, Brad and MaryLynne signed a deal with EMI Music Canada. In 2012, they released their self-titled album, which was produced by Britain's Nick Trevisick (Paramore, Katy Perry, Sting). The Stellas wrote most of the songs on their 10-track self-titled debut album, except for a cover of Fairground Attraction's "Perfect" and a live version of Boudleaux Bryant's "Love Hurts".

Collaborations on the album include Trevisick on "Take It Slow", Pistol Annies' Angaleena Presley on "I Can't Listen to Love Songs" and multi-platinum Nashville songwriter John Scott Sherrill (Kris Kristofferson, Willie Nelson) on "Wished for You".

The Stellas were featured on volume 6 and volume 7 of the Now Country Canada albums. They are one of the two Canadian acts featured on those albums. They are also featured on The Best of Now Country Canada album that came out in May 2014.

The Stellas have supported multiple sold-out tours with Zac Brown Band. Zac Brown recorded and released a song called "Let It Rain" that he wrote with Brad for his EP The Grohl Sessions, Vol. 1 (released in 2013). It is the only song on that album that Dave Grohl plays drums on.

In July 2014, The Stellas released "Gravy", a blend of twang and tongue-in-cheek humor that doubles as the first single from the duo's second album. Fred Wilhelm, who helped The Stellas write "Gravy", co-wrote several other songs, including a track called "It Wouldn't Be This".

== Awards ==
The Stellas have been nominated for eleven awards. They won the 2013 CCMA Group or Duo of the Year award, the 2013 CMAO Group or Duo of the Year award and the 2012 CCMA Video of the Year award. Brad has also been nominated for the Glenn Cole Award, RCTA, JUNOES, and RIAA awards.

== Discography ==
=== Studio albums ===
Title	Details
The Stellas	Release date: September 6, 2011; Label: EMI Music Canada

=== Singles ===
Year	Single	Album
2011	"Perfect"	The Stellas
2011	"In This House"	The Stellas
2012	"Riding in the Back Seat"	The Stellas
2014	"Gravy"	TBD
2015	"It Wouldn't Be This"	TBD

=== Other appearances ===
Year	Song	Album
2018	"Leavin's Not the Only Way to Go"	King of the Road: A Tribute to Roger Miller

=== Music videos ===
Year	Video	Director
2011	"Perfect"	Ivan Otis
2011	"In This House"	Margaret Malandruccolo
2012	"Riding in the Back Seat"	Mike Peleshok
2014	"Gravy"	Roman White
2015	"It Wouldn't Be This"	Brad Stella

== Songwriting credits ==
=== Brad Stella ===
- Matt York – "Lucky Man" (2009)
- Jake Mathews – "Our Own Back Yard"
- The Orchard – "Stick to Your Guns" (2012)
- Zac Brown Band – "Let It Rain" (2013)
- Lennon & Maisy - "Christmas Coming Home" (2012)
- The Stellas – "Christmas Comin' Home"
- The Stellas – "I Can't Listen to Love Songs"
- The Stellas – "In This House"
- The Stellas – "Riding in the Back Seat"
- The Stellas – "Take It Slow"
- The Stellas – "I Wished for You"

=== MaryLynne Stella ===
- The Orchard – "Stick to Your Guns" (2012)
- Lennon & Maisy - "Christmas Coming Home" (2012)
- Pete Lesperance – "Satellites" (2012)
- The Stellas – "Christmas Comin' Home"
- The Stellas – "I Can't Listen to Love Songs"
- The Stellas – "In This House"
- The Stellas – "The Game"
- The Stellas – "Woe Is Me"
- The Stellas – "Life of Riley"
- The Stellas – "Take It Slow"
- The Stellas – "I Wished for You"

== Awards and nominations ==
Year	Association	Category	Result
2012	Canadian Country Music Association	Group or Duo of the Year	Nominated
2012	Canadian Country Music Association	Rising Star	Nominated
2012	Canadian Country Music Association	CMT Video of the Year – "In This House"	Won
2013	Canadian Country Music Association	Group or Duo of the Year	Won
