= (Now and Then There's) A Fool Such as I =

1952 song by Bill Trader

"Now and Then There's A Fool Such as I"

Single by Hank Snow (The Singing Ranger) And His Rainbow Ranch Boys
- B-side: "The Gal Who Invented Kissin'"
- Published: November 14, 1952 by Bob Miller, Inc., New York
- Released: November 1952
- Recorded: May 19, 1952
- Genre: Country
- Length: 2:31
- Label: RCA Victor 20-5034
- Songwriter: William Trader

Hank Snow (The Singing Ranger) And His Rainbow Ranch Boys singles chronology
"I Went To Your Wedding" (1952)	"Now and Then There's A Fool Such as I" (1952)	"Honeymoon on a Rocket Ship" (1953)

"(Now and Then There's) A Fool Such as I" is a popular song written by Bill Trader and published in 1952. Recorded as a single by Hank Snow it peaked at number four on the US country charts early in 1953.

Since the original Snow version, "Fool Such as I"—as the song is sometimes known—has been recorded and released as singles several times, by artists such as Jo Stafford, Elvis Presley, Bob Dylan, and Baillie & the Boys.

== Other versions ==
=== Elvis Presley version ===
"(Now and Then There's) A Fool Such as I"

Single by Elvis Presley
- B-side: "I Need Your Love Tonight"
- Released: March 10, 1959
- Recorded: June 10, 1958
- Studio: RCA Studio B, Nashville
- Length: 2:39
- Label: RCA Victor
- Songwriter: Bill Trader
- Producer: Steve Sholes

Elvis Presley singles chronology
"One Night" / "I Got Stung" (1958)	"I Need Your Love Tonight" / "(Now and Then There's) A Fool Such as I" (1959)	"A Big Hunk o' Love" / "My Wish Came True" (1959)

Music video
- "(Now and Then There's) A Fool Such as I" (audio) on YouTube

The recording by Elvis Presley was a platinum record. Initially released as B-side to "I Need Your Love Tonight", it reached number one in the UK as an A-side single and was his first number one in Australia. Presley's recording reached number two in the United States (stalled behind the Fleetwoods' "Come Softly to Me").

The song was recorded on June 10, 1958, at RCA's Studio B, Nashville, while Presley was on leave from the Army. The recording featured guitar by Hank Garland, Chet Atkins and Presley, bass by Bob Moore, drums by D. J. Fontana and Buddy Harman and piano by Floyd Cramer and backing vocal by the Jordanaires, with the bass voice provided by Ray Walker. It reached number sixteen on the R&B charts.

=== Tommy Edwards ===
The Tommy Edwards version reached number 13 on the Cash Box survey. Listed a co-best-seller with the Jo Stafford version, it lasted 11 weeks in their chart.

=== Jo Stafford ===
The recording by Jo Stafford was released by Columbia Records as catalog number 39930. It reached the Billboard Best Seller chart on February 28, 1953, at number twenty, its only week on the chart.

=== Petula Clark ===
Petula Clark's French language version titled "Prends mon Coeur", was more successful in France (number 9, 1960) than Presley's version.

=== Bob Dylan ===
"A Fool Such as I"

Single by Bob Dylan

from the album Dylan
- B-side: "Lily of the West"
- Released: November 1973
- Recorded: April 26, 1969
- Length: 2:41 (album); 2:38 (single)
- Label: Columbia
- Songwriter: Bill Trader
- Producer: Bob Johnston

Bob Dylan singles chronology
"Knockin' on Heaven's Door" (1973)	"A Fool Such as I" (1973)	"On a Night Like This" (1974)

In 1967, Bob Dylan recorded the song during the Basement Tape sessions. For many years never officially released, the recording had been widely bootlegged, and was finally released November 4, 2014, on The Bootleg Series Vol. 11: The Basement Tapes Complete. Dylan recorded the song again in April 1969; that version was released in 1973 by Columbia on the Dylan album. On the 1973 Dylan album and several associated Columbia 1973 singles, the song is wrongly credited to "B. Abner" and "LeFevre Sing Pub Co (BMI)". This is a different song with the same title, written by Buford Abner of the Swanee River Boys. The mistake has since been corrected, Dylan's website page for the song showing the correct writing credit for Bill Trader as of October 2026.

=== Rodney Crowell ===
Rodney Crowell covered the song in 1979. The release was not a success, peaking at No. 90 in the Billboard country charts. It was his second charting single after "Elvira" in the previous year which barely scraped the bottom of the charts as well. Both songs were included in his debut album Ain't Living Long Like This.

=== Baillie & the Boys ===
"Fool Such as I"

Single by Baillie & the Boys

from the album The Lights of Home
- B-side: "So Strong"
- Released: August 11, 1990
- Genre: Country
- Length: 2:50
- Label: RCA
- Songwriter: Bill Trader
- Producer: Kyle Lehning

Baillie & the Boys singles chronology
"Perfect" (1990)	"Fool Such as I" (1990)	"Treat Me Like a Stranger" (1991)

In 1990, Baillie & the Boys released the song from the band's album The Lights of Home. This version, released under the title "Fool Such as I", peaked at No. 5 on the Billboard Hot Country Singles chart. It was the trio's last Top 10 hit on the country charts.

=== Slim Whitman ===
Whitman also recorded his own country version on the Imperial Records label in 1959.

=== The Smiths ===
In February 1987, the Smiths recorded a cover based on Presley's rendition at Firehouse Studios in Streatham. It was meant to be used as a B-side to a single from their album Strangeways, Here We Come. As of 2023, the song remains unreleased.

== Chart performance ==
=== Elvis Presley ===
Chart (1959)	Peak position
US Billboard Hot 100	2
US Hot Rhythm & Blues Singles	16
US Cashbox Hot Singles	2
US Cashbox Hot Country Singles	6
UK Singles Chart	1
Canadian Singles Chart	1
Australian Kent Singles Chart	1
Belgian Singles Chart	13
Dutch Singles Chart	15
Norway VG-lista Singles Chart	5
South African Singles Chart	1
Swedish Singles Chart	17
Chart (2005)	Peak position
Scottish Singles Sales (Official Charts)	1
UK Singles Chart	2
European Singles Chart	6

=== Baillie & the Boys ===
Chart (1990)	Peak position
Canada Country Singles (RPM)	7
US Country Songs (Billboard)	5

==== Year-end charts ====
Chart (1990)	Position
Canada Country Tracks (RPM)	92
