= Ae Fond Kiss (song) =

1791 song by Robert Burns

Ae Fond Kiss
The tune for Ae Fond Kiss

"Ae Fond Kiss" is a Scots song written by Robert Burns in 1791. It is Burns's most recorded love song.

== History ==
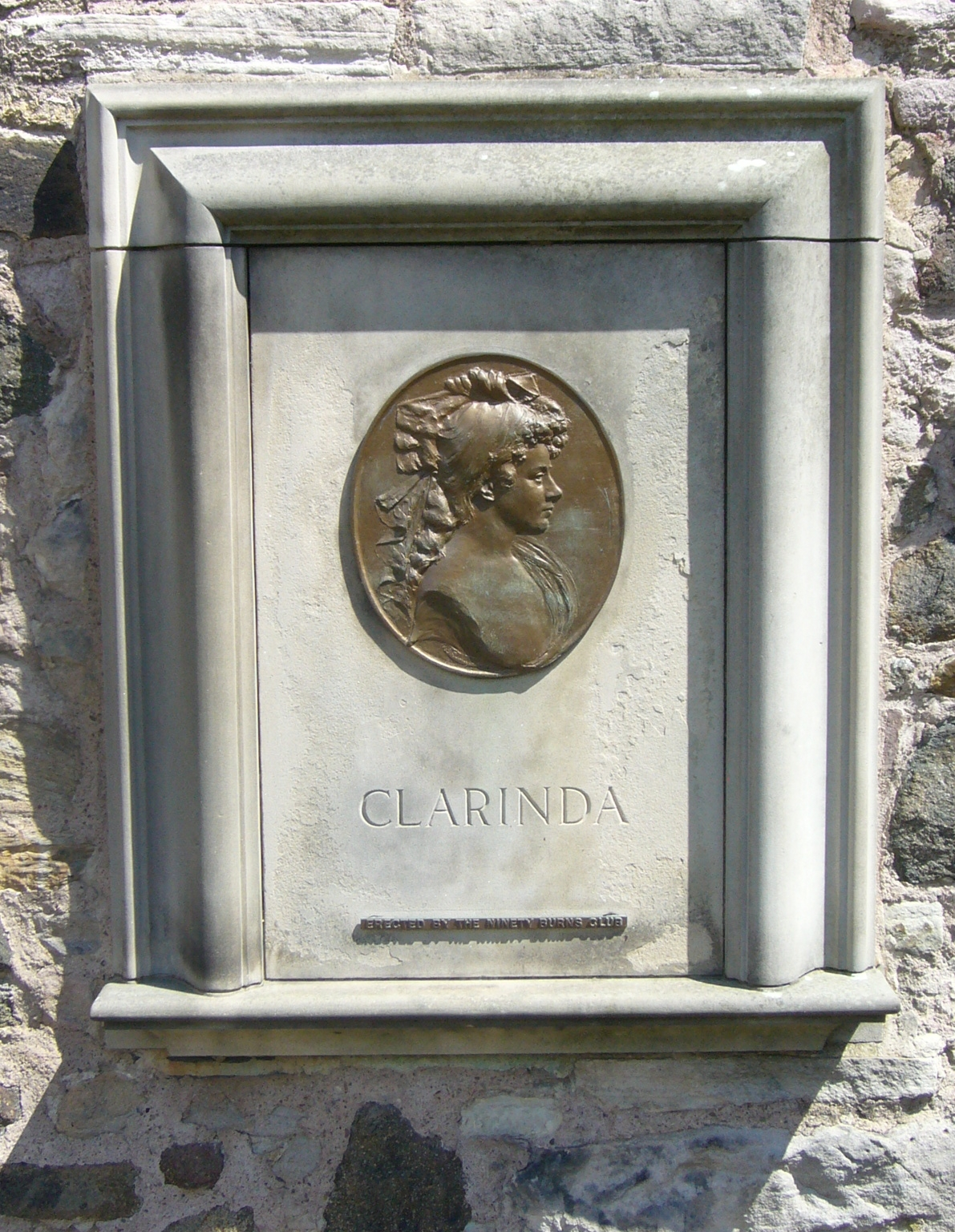
Grave of "Clarinda" in Canongate Kirkyard

After the publication of his collected poems, the Kilmarnock volume, Burns regularly travelled and stayed at Edinburgh. While there he established a platonic relationship with Mrs Agnes Maclehose and they began a regular correspondence using the pseudonyms "Clarinda" and "Sylvander". Burns wrote "Ae fond kiss" after their final meeting and sent it to Maclehose on 27 December 1791 before she departed Edinburgh for Jamaica to be with her estranged husband.

The letter is held by National Library of Scotland as part of the Watson Autograph collection of manuscripts.

Burns's original setting of three verses in eight lines was set to the tune of "Rory Dall's Port". The musical score was published in the collection of Scottish folks songs known as the Scots Musical Museum. (The melody playable on the link here is not "Rory Dall's Port", but perhaps is now more associated with the words than the original.)

== Lyrics ==
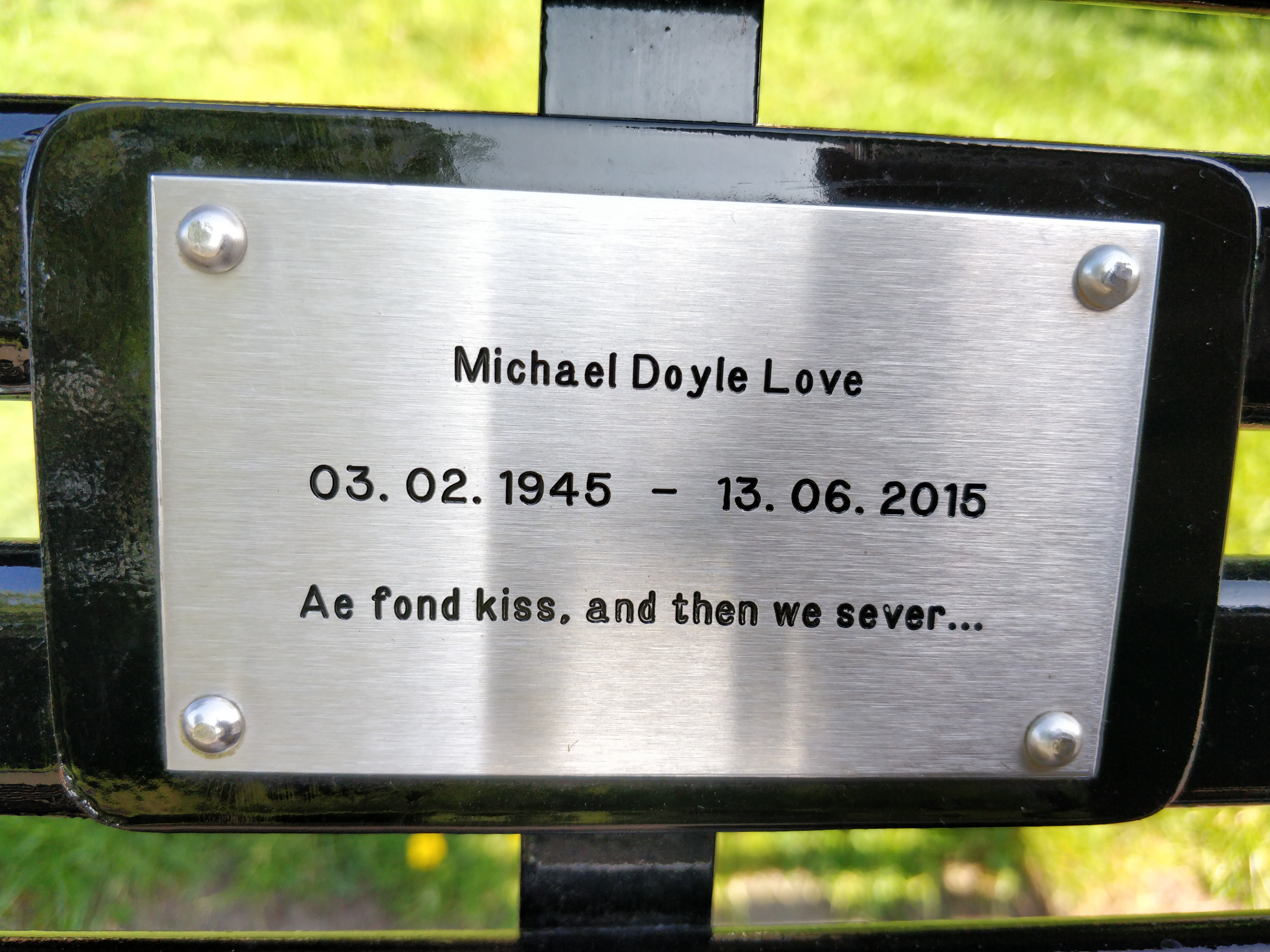
The first line on a memorial plaque

Ae fond kiss, and then we sever;
Ae fareweel, alas, for ever!
Deep in heart-wrung tears I'll pledge thee,
Warring sighs and groans I'll wage thee!
Who shall say that Fortune grieves him
While the star of hope she leaves him?
Me, nae cheerfu' twinkle lights me,
Dark despair around benights me.

I'll ne'er blame my partial fancy;
Naething could resist my Nancy;
For to see her was to love her,
Love but her, and love for ever.
Had we never loved sae kindly,
Had we never loved sae blindly,
Never met—or never parted,
We had ne'er been broken-hearted.

Fare thee weel, thou first and fairest!
Fare thee weel, thou best and dearest!
Thine be ilka joy and treasure,
Peace, enjoyment, love, and pleasure!
Ae fond kiss, and then we sever!
Ae fareweel, alas, for ever!
Deep in heart-wrung tears I'll pledge thee,
Warring sighs and groans I'll wage thee!

=== Glossary ===
- ae (pronounced [eː] AY or [jeː] YAY) = one
- ilka = every
- Nancy = pet form of Agnes
- sae = so

== Recordings ==
- Steve Harley – on Uncovered (2020)
- Fairground Attraction – on Ay Fond Kiss (1990)
