= The Lights of Home =

Studio album by Baillie & the Boys
- Released: May 25, 1990
- Genre: Country
- Label: RCA Records
- Producer: Kyle Lehning

Baillie & the Boys chronology
| Turn the Tide (1989) | The Lights of Home (1990) | Lovin' Every Minute (1996) |

Singles from The Lights of Home
- 1. "Perfect" Released: April 14, 1990; 2. "(Now and Then There's) A Fool Such as I" Released: August 11, 1990; 3. "Treat Me Like a Stranger" Released: January 5, 1991

The Lights of Home is the third studio album by American country music group Baillie & the Boys. It rose to the number 35 position in the Billboard Country Albums chart in 1990. The singles hits were the number 23 "Perfect," the number 5 "(Now and Then There's) A Fool Such as I" (which was a remake of the classic Hank Snow standard) and the number 18 "Treat Me Like a Stranger." This was also their first album as a duo, and their final album for RCA Records.

== Track listing ==
| No. | Title | Writer(s) | Length |
|---|---|---|---|
| 1. | "Can't Stand to Be Unhappy" | Hugh Prestwood | 3:28 |
| 2. | "So Strong" | Pat Bunch, Michael Bonagura, Kathie Baillie | 3:23 |
| 3. | "The Lights of Home" | Rory Bourke, Bucky Jones, Charlie Black | 3:30 |
| 4. | "Perfect" | Mark E. Nevin | 2:57 |
| 5. | "I Love Our Love" | Baillie | 3:29 |
| 6. | "I'd Love To" | Bunch, Bonagura | 2:36 |
| 7. | "Treat Me Like a Stranger" | Bonagura, Peter McCann | 3:33 |
| 8. | "On the Far Side" | Bunch, Bonagura | 2:44 |
| 9. | "Fool Such as I" | Bill Trader | 3:01 |
| 10. | "You Better Do Better" | Michael Garvin, Tom Shapiro, Jones | 3:03 |

== Chart performance ==
| Chart (1990) | Peak position |
|---|---|
| U.S. Billboard Top Country Albums | 35 |
