= Clare (song) =

Single by Fairground Attraction

from the album The First of a Million Kisses
- A-side: "Clare"
- B-side: "The Game of Love"
- Released: 16 January 1989
- Recorded: January 1988
- Genre: Soft rock, skiffle, folk
- Length: 3:16
- Label: RCA Records
- Songwriter: Mark E. Nevin
- Producers: Fairground Attraction, Kevin Moloney

Fairground Attraction singles chronology
"A Smile in a Whisper" (1988)	"Clare" (1989)

"Clare" is a song by British band Fairground Attraction, which was released on 16 January 1989 as the final single from their debut album The First of a Million Kisses. The song peaked in the UK Singles Chart at number 49. It was the last single released by the band before they split up.

== Music video ==
A music video for the song exists filmed in New Orleans.

== Critical reception ==
On its release as a single, Steve Lamacq of New Musical Express considered "Clare" to be a "jazzier number" than "Perfect" and felt the song was released as a single "with good reason". He added, "It busks away and Eddi Reader's athletic vocals do an exotic dance with an eligible clarinet".

== Track listing ==
=== Original 12" release ===
1. "Clare" 3:14
2. "Do You Want To Know A Secret?" 2:33
3. "The Game of Love" 3:25
4. "Jock O' Hazeldean" 3:06

== Charts ==
=== Weekly charts ===
Chart (1989)	Peak position
Italy Airplay (Music & Media)	1
UK Singles Chart	49
