= Brit Awards 1989 =

British music awards ceremony

- Date: 13 February 1989
- Venue: Royal Albert Hall
- Hosted by: Mick Fleetwood and Samantha Fox
- Most awards: Fairground Attraction, Michael Jackson and Tracy Chapman (2)
- Most nominations: The Christians, Enya, Fairground Attraction, Michael Jackson, Pet Shop Boys, Robert Palmer, Steve Winwood, Tanita Tikaram, Tracy Chapman and Wet Wet Wet (2)

Television/radio coverage
- Network: BBC

Brit Awards 1989 was the ninth edition of the Brit Awards, an annual pop music awards ceremony in the United Kingdom. It was organised by the British Phonographic Industry and took place on 13 February 1989 at Royal Albert Hall in London. This year marked the first presentation of the International Female Solo Artist and International Male Solo Artist awards.

The awards ceremony, hosted by Mick Fleetwood and Samantha Fox, was televised live by the BBC. The hosting was criticised for being poorly coordinated, with missed cues and incorrect introductions; the teleprompter did not work properly, and in 2010, Fox claimed that there had been multiple errors in the information given to the hosts on the night. The event organisers did not play a pre-recorded message from Michael Jackson, and the audience booed the government minister Kenneth Baker.

After the 1989 event, the awarding committee decided to have the Brit Awards recorded and broadcast on television the following night, to be able to edit out errors and unwanted happenings on the stage. The awards ceremony was not broadcast live again until the 2007 Brit Awards.

== Performances ==
- Bros – "I Owe You Nothing"
- Def Leppard – "Pour Some Sugar on Me"
- Fairground Attraction – "Perfect"
- Gloria Estefan Miami Sound Machine – "Rhythm Is Gonna Get You"
- Randy Newman ft. Mark Knopfler and the BRITs Supergroup – "Falling in love"
- Tanita Tikaram – "Good Tradition"
- Yazz – "Got to Share"

== Winners and nominees ==
British Album of the Year	Lifetime Achievement
Fairground Attraction – The First of a Million Kisses; Aztec Camera – Love; The Pasadenas – To Whom It May Concern; Pet Shop Boys – Introspective; Steve Winwood – Roll with It	Cliff Richard
British Single of the Year	British Video of the Year
Fairground Attraction – "Perfect"; Art of Noise featuring Tom Jones – "Kiss"; Deacon Blue – "Real Gone Kid"; Robert Palmer – "She Makes My Day"; Tanita Tikaram – "Twist in My Sobriety"	Michael Jackson – "Smooth Criminal" (United States); Bananarama – "Nathan Jones"; The Christians – "Harvest for the World"; George Harrison – "When We Was Fab"; Wet Wet Wet – "Temptation"
British Male Solo Artist	British Female Solo Artist
Phil Collins; Chris Rea; George Michael; Robert Palmer; Steve Winwood	Annie Lennox; Mica Paris; Sade Adu; Tanita Tikaram; Yazz
British Group	British Breakthrough Act
Erasure; The Christians; Def Leppard; Pet Shop Boys; Wet Wet Wet	Bros
International Male Solo Artist	International Female Solo Artist
Michael Jackson; Alexander O'Neal; Luther Vandross; Prince; Terence Trent D'Arby	Tracy Chapman; Anita Baker; Enya; Kylie Minogue; Whitney Houston
International Group	International Breakthrough Act
U2; Bon Jovi; Fleetwood Mac; INXS; Womack & Womack	Tracy Chapman; Belinda Carlisle; Enya; Michelle Shocked; Salt-N-Pepa
Classical Recording	Soundtrack/Cast Recording
Trevor Pinnock; André Previn; Jeffrey Tate; Philip Brunelle; Simon Rattle	Buster; Good Morning, Vietnam; Hairspray; The Princess Bride; Rattle and Hum

== Multiple nominations and awards ==
The following artists received multiple awards and/or nominations.

Artists that received multiple nominations
Nominations	Artist
2	The Christians
2	Enya
2	Fairground Attraction
2	Michael Jackson
2	Pet Shop Boys
2	Robert Palmer
2	Steve Winwood
2	Tanita Tikaram
2	Tracy Chapman
2	Wet Wet Wet

Artists that received multiple awards
Awards	Artist
2	Fairground Attraction
2	Michael Jackson
2	Tracy Chapman
