= Wilder Days =

Single by Baillie & the Boys

from the album Baillie & the Boys
- B-side: "You Fool"
- Released: December 19, 1987
- Genre: Country
- Length: 2:40
- Label: RCA
- Songwriter(s): Michael Bonagura, Craig Bickhardt
- Producer(s): Kyle Lehning, Paul Davis

Baillie & the Boys singles chronology
"He's Letting Go" (1987)	"Wilder Days" (1987)	"Long Shot" (1988)

"Wilder Days" is a song written by Michael Bonagura and Craig Bickhardt, and recorded by American country music group Baillie & the Boys. It was released in December 1987 as the third single from the album Baillie & the Boys. The song reached #9 on the Billboard Hot Country Singles & Tracks chart. Wilder Days was also recorded by The Ozark Mountain Daredevils on their "Modern History", album.

== Chart performance ==
Chart (1987–1988)	Peak position
US Hot Country Songs (Billboard)	9
Canadian RPM Country Tracks	7
