= The First of a Million Kisses =

Studio album by Fairground Attraction
- Released: 16 May 1988
- Recorded: 1988
- Studios: Chipping Norton Studios (Chipping Norton, England)
- Genre: Skiffle
- Length: 47:53
- Label: RCA
- Producers: Fairground Attraction and Kevin Moloney

Fairground Attraction chronology
The First of a Million Kisses (1988)	Ay Fond Kiss (1990)

Singles from Fairground Attraction
- 1. "Perfect" Released: 28 March 1988; 2. "Find My Love" Released: 18 July 1988; 3. "A Smile in a Whisper" Released: 31 October 1988; 4. "Clare" Released: 16 January 1989

Professional ratings
Review scores
Source	Rating
AllMusic	3.5/5 stars

The First of a Million Kisses is the debut album by British folk and soft rock band Fairground Attraction, released on 16 May 1988 by RCA Records. It includes the number-one single "Perfect".

== Composition ==
The album is a characteristic blend of folk, jazz, country, and Cajun elements, with all but one of its songs being written by band member Mark E. Nevin. It followed the success of the band's first single, "Perfect", entering the UK Albums Chart at number seven, and peaking at number two. It was the only album released by the band before their break-up in 1990.

Three other singles were released from the album: "Find My Love" (which reached number seven in the UK Singles Chart), "A Smile in a Whisper" (UK No. 75), and "Clare" (UK No. 49).

The First of a Million Kisses won the award for British Album of the Year at the 1989 Brit Awards, and was certified double platinum in the UK.

== Cover ==
The photo on the album cover is from Magnum photographer Elliott Erwitt and was taken in 1955.

== Track listing ==
=== Original version ===
LP & cassette

All tracks written by Mark E. Nevin, except where noted.

No.	Title	Writer(s)	Length
1.	"A Smile in a Whisper"		3:30
2.	"Perfect"		3:36
3.	"Moon on the Rain"		3:53
4.	"Find My Love"		3:45
5.	"Fairground Attraction"		2:17
6.	"The Wind Knows My Name"		4:12
7.	"Clare"		3:15
8.	"Comedy Waltz"		3:29
9.	"The Moon Is Mine"		2:40
10.	"Station Street"		3:01
11.	"Whispers"	Eddi Reader	3:50
12.	"Allelujah"		3:25

CD extra tracks

No.	Title	Length
13.	"Falling Backwards"	2:28
14.	"Mythology"	4:38

=== 2-CD edition ===
A two-disc expanded edition of the album was released in 2017, containing the 14 tracks from the original CD plus most of the tracks from the 1990 album Ay Fond Kiss, the Live in Japan release, as well as (*) previously unreleased tracks.

All tracks written by Mark E. Nevin, except where noted.

Disc one

No.	Title	Writer(s)	Length
1.	"A Smile in a Whisper"		3:30
2.	"Perfect"		3:37
3.	"Moon on the Rain"		3:53
4.	"Find My Love"		3:45
5.	"Fairground Attraction"		2:17
6.	"The Wind Knows My Name"		4:12
7.	"Clare"		3:15
8.	"Comedy Waltz"		3:30
9.	"The Moon Is Mine"		2:41
10.	"Station Street"		3:01
11.	"Whispers"	Reader	3:50
12.	"Allelujah"		3:26
13.	"Falling Backwards"		2:29
14.	"Mythology"		4:38
15.	"Trying Times"	Donny Hathaway; Leroy Hutson	3:54
16.	"Winter Rose"		3:30
17.	"Ay Fond Kiss"	Robert Burns	3:21
18.	"You Send Me"	Sam Cooke	4:45
19.	"Watching the Party"		4:14
20.	"Jock O'Hazeldean"	traditional	3:07
21.	"The Game of Love"		3:26

Disc two

No.	Title	Writer(s)	Length
1.	"Mystery Train"	Junior Parker	1:57
2.	"Do You Want to Know a Secret?"	John Lennon; Paul McCartney	2:38
3.	"The Waltz Continues" (live in Japan)		3:38
4.	"Don't Be a Stranger" (live in Japan)		3:25
5.	"Dangerous" (live in Japan)		4:02
6.	"I Know Why the Willow Weeps" (live in Japan)		6:14
7.	"Home to Heartache" (live in Japan)		4:46
8.	"Fear Is the Enemy of Love" (live in Japan)		4:22
9.	"Broken by a Breeze" (live in Japan)		5:00
10.	"Goodbye to Songtown" (live in Japan)		4:51
11.	"I May Never Be Queen" (demo*)		4:07
12.	"Prayer to St Valentine" (*)		2:19
13.	"Swing Trumpet" (demo*)		2:47
14.	"Red Ribbon" (demo*)		3:06
15.	"Find My Love" (demo*)		3:24
16.	"Mythology" (demo*)		4:44
17.	"Station Street" (demo*)		2:48
18.	"The Moon Is Mine" (demo*)		2:47
19.	"Walking After Midnight" (version*)		1:46

== Personnel ==
Adapted from the album's liner notes.

=== Musicians ===
Fairground Attraction

- Eddi Reader – lead vocals
- Mark E. Nevin – guitars
- Simon Edwards – guitarrón
- Roy Dodds – drums and percussion

Additional musicians

- Kim Burton – accordion, tiny harp, piano
- Roger Beaujolais – vibes, glockenspiel
- Anthony Thistlethwaite – mandolin
- Steve Forster – mandolin
- Ian Shaw – backing vocals
- Will Hasty – clarinet

=== Technical ===
- Fairground Attraction – producer
- Kevin Moloney – producer, mixing
- Alistair Johnson – assistant mixing
- Kevin Metcalf – mastering
- Recorded at Chipping Norton Studios (Chipping Norton, England)
- Mastered at the Town House (London, England)
- Elliott Erwitt – front cover photography
- Richard Butchins – all other photography
- Laurence Stevens – design & typography

== Charts ==
Chart performance for The First of a Million Kisses
Chart (1988)	Peak position
Australian Albums (ARIA)	9
Austrian Albums (Ö3 Austria)	17
Canadian Albums (RPM)	57
Dutch Albums (Album Top 100)	29
Finnish Albums (Suomen virallinen lista)	13
German Albums (Offizielle Top 100)	38
New Zealand Albums (RMNZ)	19
Swedish Albums (Sverigetopplistan)	6
Swiss Albums (Schweizer Hitparade)	18
UK Albums (OCC)	2
