= Turn the Tide (album) =

Studio album by Baillie & the Boys
- Released: January 31, 1989
- Recorded: 1988 at Nightingale Studio - Nashville, TN
- Genre: Country
- Label: RCA Records
- Producer: Kyle Lehning

Baillie & the Boys chronology
Baillie & the Boys (1987)	Turn the Tide (1989)	The Lights of Home (1990)

Singles from Turn the Tide
- 1. "Long Shot" Released: October 1, 1988; 2. "She Deserves You" Released: February 4, 1989; 3. "(Wish I Had A) Heart of Stone" Released: July 1, 1989; 4. "I Can't Turn the Tide" Released: November 1989

Turn the Tide is the second studio album by American country music group Baillie & the Boys. It was a number 30 Country Album on Billboard charts. Its Hot Country Singles hits were, chronologically, "Long Shot" at number 5, "She Deserves You" at number 8, "(Wish I Had a) Heart of Stone" (their highest-charting single) at number 4, and "I Can't Turn the Tide" at number 9. "Safe in the Arms of Love" was later recorded by Michelle Wright in 1994 and Martina McBride in 1995, both of whom released it as a single.

== Track listing ==
No.	Title	Writer(s)	Length
1.	"She Deserves You"	Michael Bonagura, Kathie Baillie, Don Schlitz	2:54
2.	"Safe in the Arms of Love"	Pat Bunch, Pam Rose, Mary Ann Kennedy	3:01
3.	"I Can't Turn the Tide"	Bonagura, Baillie, Craig Bickhardt	4:02
4.	"(Wish I Had A) Heart of Stone"	Wayland Holyfield, Richard Leigh	4:20
5.	"Long Shot"	Gary Scruggs, Schlitz	2:51
6.	"Who Will I Be?"	Bonagura, Baillie, Schlitz	4:39
7.	"Honest Love"	Bonagura, Pat McManus	3:36
8.	"Lovin' by Numbers"	Bonagura, Baillie, Roger Cook	4:23
9.	"When It Rains It Pours"	Alan LeBoeuf	3:48
10.	"Heartache in Motion"	Bonagura, John Jarrard	3:13
11.	"The Only Lonely One"	Bonagura, Baillie, Schlitz	4:26

== Personnel ==
Taken from liner notes.

=== Baillie & the Boys ===
- Kathie Baillie - vocals, acoustic guitar
- Michael Bonagura - vocals, electric guitar
- Alan LeBoeuf - vocals, bass guitar

=== Additional musicians ===
- Vince Barranco - percussion
- Mike Brignardello - bass guitar
- Mark Casstevens - acoustic guitar
- Jerry Douglas - lap steel guitar
- Sonny Garrish - pedal steel guitar
- Doyle Grisham - pedal steel guitar
- David Hungate - bass guitar
- Shane Keister - keyboards
- John Barlow Jarvis - keyboards
- Paul Leim - drums, programming
- Terry McMillan - harmonica, percussion
- Brent Rowan - electric guitar
- Gary Scruggs - electric guitar, synthesizer
- Billy Joe Walker, Jr. - electric guitar

== Chart performance ==
Chart (1989)	Peak position
U.S. Billboard Top Country Albums	30
