= (Wish I Had A) Heart of Stone =

Single by Baillie & the Boys

from the album Turn the Tide
- B-side: "Heartache in Motion"
- Released: July 1, 1989
- Genre: Country
- Length: 4:20
- Label: RCA
- Songwriters: Richard Leigh, Wayland Holyfield
- Producer: Kyle Lehning

Baillie & the Boys singles chronology
"She Deserves You" (1989)	"(Wish I Had A) Heart of Stone" (1989)	"I Can't Turn the Tide" (1989)

"(Wish I Had A) Heart of Stone" is a song written by Richard Leigh and Wayland Holyfield, and recorded by American country music group Baillie & the Boys. It was released in July 1989 as the third single from the album Turn the Tide. The song reached #4 on the Billboard Hot Country Singles & Tracks chart.

== Chart performance ==
Chart (1989)	Peak position
Canada Country Singles (RPM)	4
US Country Songs (Billboard)	4

=== Year-end charts ===
Chart (1989)	Position
Canada Country Tracks (RPM)	82
US Country Songs (Billboard)	39
