= He's Letting Go =

Single by Baillie & the Boys

from the album Baillie & the Boys
- B-side: "Heartless Night"
- Released: August 8, 1987
- Genre: Country
- Length: 3:49
- Label: RCA
- Songwriter(s): Pat Bunch, Pam Rose, Mary Ann Kennedy
- Producer(s): Kyle Lehning, Paul Davis

Baillie & the Boys singles chronology
"Oh Heart" (1987)	"He's Letting Go" (1987)	"Wilder Days" (1988)

"He's Letting Go" is a song written by Pat Bunch, Pam Rose and Mary Ann Kennedy, and recorded by American country music group Baillie & the Boys. It was released in August 1987 as the second single from the album Baillie & the Boys. The song reached #18 on the Billboard Hot Country Singles & Tracks chart.

== Chart performance ==
Chart (1987)	Peak position
US Hot Country Songs (Billboard)	18
Canadian RPM Country Tracks	39
