= Long Shot (Baillie & the Boys song) =

Single by Baillie & the Boys

from the album Turn the Tide
- B-side: "You Fool"
- Released: October 1, 1988
- Genre: Country
- Length: 2:51
- Label: RCA
- Songwriter(s): Gary Scruggs, Don Schlitz
- Producer(s): Kyle Lehning

Baillie & the Boys singles chronology
| "Wilder Days" (1988) | "Long Shot" (1988) | "She Deserves You" (1989) |

"Long Shot" is a song written by Gary Scruggs and Don Schlitz, and recorded by American country music group Baillie & the Boys. It was released in October 1988 as the first single from the album Turn the Tide. The song reached #5 on the Billboard Hot Country Singles & Tracks chart.

== Chart performance ==
| Chart (1988) | Peak position |
|---|---|
| US Country Songs (Billboard) | 5 |
| Canadian RPM Country Tracks | 3 |
