= Baillie & the Boys =

American country music group

Baillie & The Boys
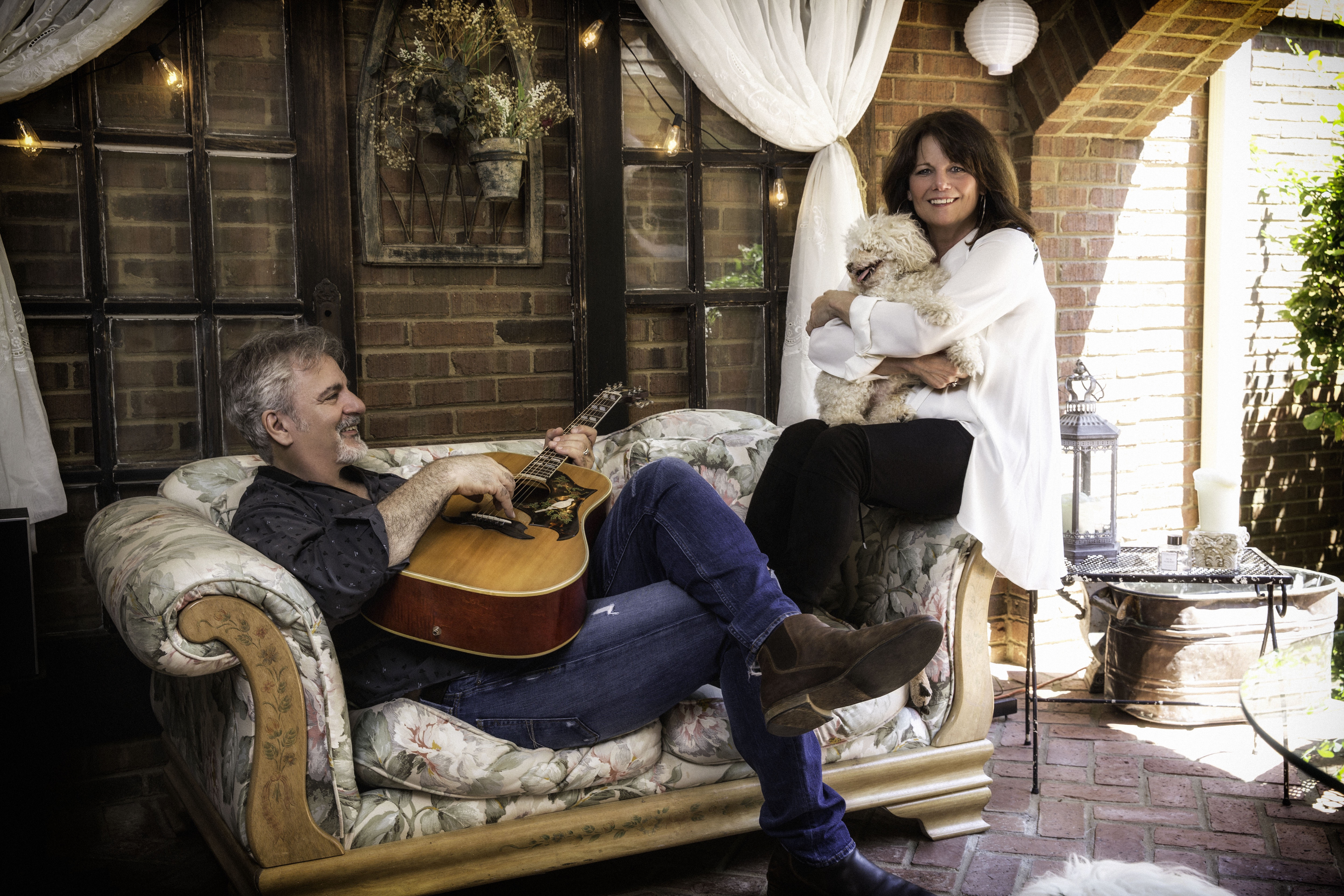
- Michael Bonagura (left) and Kathie Baillie (right) in 2017

Background information
- Origin: New Jersey, United States
- Genres: Country
- Years active: 1987–2021
- Labels: RCA, Intersound, Synergy
- Past members: Kathie Baillie; Michael Bonagura; Roger McVay; Lance Hoppen; Alan LeBoeuf

Baillie & the Boys were an American country music group. They were founded in 1987 by Kathie Baillie (lead vocals, guitar) and her husband, Michael Bonagura (background vocals, guitar), along with Alan LeBoeuf (bass guitar, background vocals). Not including Kathie Baillie's solo recordings, Baillie & the Boys have recorded five studio albums and charted ten Top-40 singles on the U.S. Billboard Hot Country Singles & Tracks charts (between 1987 and 1991).

After LeBoeuf's departure in 1988, Baillie & the Boys toured as a duo, with Lance Hoppen filling in as the third vocalist until Roger McVay was chosen as a replacement in 1995. Four years later, McVay departed and LeBoeuf rejoined. Although the trio has not charted a single since 1991, they continued to tour and record until 2012.

== Background ==
Singers Alan LeBoeuf and Michael Bonagura were originally members of a New Jersey–based musical group called London Fog. In 1977, Bonagura met singer Kathie Baillie after a friend sent him recordings of her work; Bonagura and Baillie married the same year. Shortly afterward, Bonagura and Baillie joined up with LeBoeuf, forming the lineup for Baillie & the Boys. The trio toured throughout the state of New Jersey, and later moved to Nashville, Tennessee, after a friend persuaded them.

The trio first found work singing harmony vocals on singles for Ed Bruce, Dan Seals, and Randy Travis, and Bonagura co-wrote Marie Osmond's single "There's No Stopping Your Heart". In 1987, Baillie & the Boys were signed to a record deal on the RCA Records label. Their self-titled album was released that year, producing three Top 20 singles on the U.S. Billboard Hot Country Singles (now Hot Country Songs) charts. Turn The Tide, their second album, was released a year later. It produced four consecutive Top 10 hits on the country charts, including "(Wish I Had a) Heart of Stone", their highest-charting single.

LeBoeuf left the group in 1988 shortly after the release of Turn the Tide. Baillie & the Boys then toured as a duo, with their 1990 album The Lights of Home including only Baillie and Bonagura, although Lance Hoppen, formerly of Orleans, filled in while the band was on tour with George Strait. The role was later filled by Roger McVay, who had toured with the band since 1992 but was not declared an official member until 1995. McVay's first appearance as an official member was on the 1996 album Lovin' Every Minute.

The group then went on hiatus before reuniting in August 1998 to perform a benefit concert in Daytona Beach, Florida, one year before McVay left. LeBoeuf again assumed the role of high harmony vocals, returning the band to its original lineup. A fifth album, titled The Road That Led Me to You, was released on an independent label in 2000. Baillie also released a solo album, titled Love's Funny That Way, on February 20, 2007. The title track of Baillie's solo album was released as a single shortly after. In December 2011, Baillie & the Boys released their latest album Unplugged, through the New York-based SynErgy Entertainment label.

== Discography ==
=== Albums ===
Year	Title	US Country
1987	Baillie & the Boys	27
1989	Turn the Tide	30
1990	The Lights of Home	35
1991	The Best of Baillie & the Boys	
1996	Lovin' Every Minute	
2000	The Road That Led Me to You	
2007	Love's Funny That Way (Kathie Baillie solo album)	
2012	Unplugged: Baillie & the Boys Live In Concert	
2021	B & B 93	

=== Singles ===
Year	Single	Peak positions		Album
Year	Single	US Country	CAN Country	Album
1987	"Oh Heart"	9	17	Baillie & the Boys
1987	"He's Letting Go"	18	39	Baillie & the Boys
1987	"Wilder Days"	9	7	Baillie & the Boys
1988	"Long Shot"	5	3	Turn the Tide
1989	"She Deserves You"	8	5	Turn the Tide
1989	"(Wish I Had A) Heart of Stone"	4	4	Turn the Tide
1989	"I Can't Turn the Tide"	9	4	Turn the Tide
1990	"Perfect"	23	16	The Lights of Home
1990	"Fool Such as I"	5	7	The Lights of Home
1991	"Treat Me Like a Stranger"	18	16	The Lights of Home
1996	"Some Kind of Luck"	—	—	Lovin' Every Minute
1997	"The God's Honest Truth"	—	—	Lovin' Every Minute
1997	"You're My Weakness"	—	—	Lovin' Every Minute
1997	"Lovin' Every Minute"	—	—	Lovin' Every Minute
2000	"The Road That Led Me You"	—	—	The Road That Led Me You
2000	"The Moment"	—	—	The Road That Led Me You
2006	"One Thing"	—	—	Love's Funny That Way
"—" denotes releases that did not chart

=== Music videos ===
Year	Video	Director
1988	"Long Shot"	Bob Small
1989	"I Can't Turn the Tide"	Bob Small
1990	"Perfect"	Dave Bridges
1991	"Treat Me Like a Stranger"	Bob Small
1996	"Some Kind of Luck"	Tom Bevins
1997	"The God's Honest Truth"	Tom Bevins
2006	"One Thing"	Ed Guthero
