= I Can't Turn the Tide =

Single by Baillie & the Boys

from the album Turn the Tide
- B-side: "The Only Lonely One"
- Released: November 1989
- Genre: Country
- Length: 4:02
- Label: RCA
- Songwriters: Kathie Baillie, Michael Bonagura, Craig Bickhardt
- Producer: Kyle Lehning

Baillie & the Boys singles chronology
"(Wish I Had A) Heart of Stone" (1989)	"I Can't Turn the Tide" (1989)	"Perfect" (1990)

"I Can't Turn the Tide" is a song written by Kathie Baillie, Michael Bonagura and Craig Bickhardt, and recorded by American country music group Baillie & the Boys. It was released in November 1989 as the fourth single from the album Turn the Tide. The song reached number 9 on the Billboard Hot Country Singles & Tracks chart.

== Chart performance ==
Chart (1989–1990)	Peak position
Canada Country Singles (RPM)	4
US Country Songs (Billboard)	9

=== Year-end charts ===
Chart (1990)	Position
Canada Country Tracks (RPM)	34
US Country Songs (Billboard)	48
