= Oh Heart =

Single by Baillie & the Boys

from the album Baillie & the Boys
- B-side: "Waitin' Out the Storm"
- Released: June 1987
- Genre: Country
- Length: 3:27
- Label: RCA
- Songwriter(s): Kathie Baillie, Michael Bonagura, Don Schlitz
- Producer(s): Kyle Lehning, Paul Davis

Baillie & the Boys singles chronology
"Oh Heart" (1987)	"He's Letting Go" (1987)

"Oh Heart" is a debut song written by Kathie Baillie, Michael Bonagura and Don Schlitz, and recorded by American country music group Baillie & the Boys. It was released in June 1987 as the first single from the album Baillie & the Boys. The song reached #9 on the Billboard Hot Country Singles & Tracks chart.

== Chart performance ==
Chart (1987)	Peak position
US Hot Country Songs (Billboard)	9
Canadian RPM Country Tracks	17
