= Treat Me Like a Stranger =

Single by Baillie & the Boys

from the album The Lights of Home
- B-side: "I'd Love To"
- Released: January 5, 1991
- Genre: Country
- Length: 3:29
- Label: RCA
- Songwriters: Michael Bonagura, Peter McCann
- Producer: Kyle Lehning

Baillie & the Boys singles chronology
"Fool Such as I" (1990)	"Treat Me Like a Stranger" (1991)	"Some Kind of Luck" (1996)

"Treat Me Like a Stranger" is a song written by Michael Bonagura and Peter McCann, and recorded by American country music group Baillie & the Boys. It was released in January 1991 as the third single from the album The Lights of Home. The song reached #18 on the Billboard Hot Country Singles & Tracks chart.

== Chart performance ==
Chart (1991)	Peak position
Canada Country Singles (RPM)	16
US Country Songs (Billboard)	18
