= She Deserves You =

Single by Baillie & the Boys

from the album Turn the Tide
- B-side: "The Only Lonely One"
- Released: February 4, 1989
- Genre: Country
- Length: 2:54
- Label: RCA
- Songwriters: Kathie Baillie, Michael Bonagura, Don Schlitz
- Producer: Kyle Lehning

Baillie & the Boys singles chronology
"Long Shot" (1988)	"She Deserves You" (1989)	"(Wish I Had A) Heart of Stone" (1989)

"She Deserves You" is a song written by Kathie Baillie, Michael Bonagura and Don Schlitz, and recorded by American country music group Baillie & the Boys. It was released in February 1989 as the second single from the album Turn the Tide. The song reached #8 on the Billboard Hot Country Singles & Tracks chart.

== Chart performance ==
Chart (1989)	Peak position
Canada Country Singles (RPM)	5
US Country Songs (Billboard)	8

=== Year-end charts ===
Chart (1989)	Position
Canada Country Tracks (RPM)	90
US Country Songs (Billboard)	90
