= Baillie & the Boys (album) =

Studio album by Baillie & the Boys
- Released: 1987
- Genre: Country
- Label: RCA Records
- Producer: Paul Davis; Kyle Lehning

Baillie & the Boys chronology
Baillie & the Boys (1987)	Turn the Tide (1989)

Singles from Baillie & the Boys
- 1. "Oh Heart" Released: June 1987; 2. "He's Letting Go" Released: August 8, 1987; 3. "Wilder Days" Released: December 18, 1987

Baillie & the Boys is the debut studio album by American country music group Baillie & the Boys. Three singles charted on the Billboard Hot Country Singles chart - "Oh Heart" at number 9, "He's Letting Go" at number 18, and "Wilder Days" at number 9. The album rose to the number 27 position in the Country Albums chart.

== Track listing ==
No.	Title	Writer(s)	Length
1.	"Fire in the Wire"	Susanne Jerome Taylor, John Paul Daniel	4:01
2.	"Oh Heart"	Kathie Baillie, Michael Bonagura, Don Schlitz	3:27
3.	"Waitin' Out the Storm"	Craig Bickhardt, Bonagura	3:54
4.	"You Fool"	Baillie, Alan LeBoeuf	3:31
5.	"Heartless Night"	Bickhardt, Bonagura	3:51
6.	"He's Letting Go"	Pam Rose, Pat Bunch, Mary Ann Kennedy	3:49
7.	"Slow All Night"	Karla Bonoff	4:15
8.	"Wilder Days"	Bickhardt, Bonagura	2:48
9.	"This Is Where I Came In"	Wendy Waldman, Phil Galdston	4:20

== Personnel ==
Compiled from liner notes.

Baillie & the Boys

- Kathie Baillie – lead vocals
- Michael Bonagura – vocals, acoustic guitar, electric guitar
- Alan LeBoeuf – vocals, bass guitar

Additional musicians

- Mike Brignardello – bass guitar
- Dennis Burnside – keyboards
- Mark Casstevens – acoustic guitar
- Paul Davis – Synclavier; additional vocals on "Heartless Night"
- Jerry Douglas – lap steel guitar
- Steve Gibson – palm pedal
- Doyle Grisham – steel guitar
- David Hungate – bass guitar
- Dirk Johnson – keyboards
- Shane Keister – keyboards
- Kyle Lehning – Synclavier
- Paul Leim – drums
- Larrie Londin – drums
- Kenny Mims – electric guitar
- Mark O'Connor – fiddle
- Michael Rhodes – bass guitar
- Billy Joe Walker, Jr. – electric guitar

Technical

- Joseph Bogan – engineering
- Paul Davis – production
- Tom Der – engineering
- Tom Harding – engineering
- Kyle Lehning – production, engineering, mixing
- Kirt Odle – engineering
- Doug Sax – mastering

== Chart performance ==
Chart (1987)	Peak position
U.S. Billboard Top Country Albums	27
