= A Smile in a Whisper =

Single by Fairground Attraction

from the album The First of a Million Kisses
- A-side: "A Smile in a Whisper"
- B-side: "Winter Rose"
- Released: 31 October 1988
- Recorded: January 1988
- Genre: Soft rock, skiffle, folk
- Length: 3:30
- Label: RCA Records
- Songwriter: Mark E. Nevin
- Producer: Kevin Moloney

Fairground Attraction singles chronology
"Find My Love" (1988)	"A Smile in a Whisper" (1988)	"Clare" (1989)

"A Smile in a Whisper" is a song by British band Fairground Attraction, which was released on 31 October 1988 as the third single from their debut album The First of a Million Kisses. The song peaked in the UK Singles Chart at number 75. It was the first (and second last) single from their debut album to not enter the UK Top 40.

== Music video ==
A music video for the song exists filmed partly on London's Embankment.

== Track listings ==
=== Original 12" release ===
1. "A Smile in a Whisper 3:30"
2. "Walking After Midnight 2:48"
3. "Winter Rose 3:31"
4. "Trying Times 3:45"

== Charts ==
=== Weekly charts ===
Chart (1988–1989)	Peak position
Italy Airplay (Music & Media)	9
UK Singles Chart	75
