= Imperial Records (1900) =

- Founded: 1900s
- Country of origin: United States

The earliest Imperial Records was a short-lived United States–based company of the 1900s, producing single-sided lateral cut gramophone records. Issues included ragtime banjo music, operatic solos, and Hebrew songs. As the name implies, they seem to have been destined at least in part for the British market. The back of the records carried a paper label printed with a copyright statement.

== See also ==
- List of record labels
- Imperial Records
