= Find My Love =

Single by Fairground Attraction

from the album The First of a Million Kisses
- A-side: "Find My Love"
- B-side: "Watching the Party"
- Released: 11 July 1988
- Length: 3:45
- Label: RCA
- Songwriter: Mark E. Nevin
- Producer: Fairground Attraction

Fairground Attraction singles chronology
"Perfect" (1988)	"Find My Love" (1988)	"A Smile in a Whisper" (1988)

"Find My Love" is a song by the British band Fairground Attraction, which was released as their second single from their debut album The First of a Million Kisses in July 1988. As with much of their debut album, the words and music of the song are written by Mark Nevin.

The single peaked at number 7 on the UK Singles Chart and spent a total of 11 weeks on the chart. It was their last single to reach a top 40 position. The song also reached the top 10 in Austria and Ireland, where it peaked at number 3 and 6, respectively.

Musically, "Find My Love" is characterised by its use of the Spanish guitar.

The song was sampled by Coldplay in their song Life in Technicolor II.

== Track listings ==
=== 7" single ===
1. "Find My Love"
2. "Watching the Party"

=== 12" single ===
1. "Find My Love"
2. "Watching the Party"
3. "You Send Me"
4. "Ay Fond Kiss"

== Charts ==
=== Weekly charts ===
Chart (1988)	Peak position
Australia (ARIA)	86
Austria (Ö3 Austria Top 40)	3
Belgium (Ultratop 50 Flanders)	24
Ireland (IRMA)	6
Italy Airplay (Music & Media)	17
Netherlands (Dutch Top 40)	28
Netherlands (Single Top 100)	30
New Zealand (Recorded Music NZ)	34
UK Singles (OCC)	7
West Germany (GfK)	22

=== Year-end charts ===
Chart (1988)	Position
UK Singles (OCC)	89
