= John of Hazelgreen =

Traditional song

John of Hazelgreen or Jock o' Hazeldean (Roud 250, Child 293) is an English-language traditional folk song. Jock of Hazeldean is a poem and song by Sir Walter Scott based on a fragment of the ballad. Versions of the ballad were published by Chambers, Kinloch and Buchan. The version printed by John S. Roberts (1887) was compiled from those of Kinloch and Buchan.

Scott's Jock of Hazeldean was first published in 1816 in Alexander Campbell's Albyn's Anthology, printed alongside the tune to which it is now usually sung.

== Synopsis ==
A man asks a maid why she is weeping; it is for the love of John of Hazelgreen. He offers to marry her to his oldest, or youngest, son if she will forsake him, and she refuses. Nevertheless, he takes her with him, and he proves to be John of Hazelgreen's father, and informs his son that he is marrying her that day.

The Jock of Hazeldean version has a different plot. The father of the groom tries to reconcile the woman to marrying his son, but she is utterly passive in the face of her prospective father-in-law's enticements, replying only by weeping. However, at the very end of the song, she turns out to have been playing a waiting game; she has disappeared with her lover Jock O'Hazeldean, eloping across the English-Scottish border.

== See also ==
- List of the Child Ballads
