= Perfect (Fairground Attraction song) =

1988 single by Fairground Attraction

Single by Fairground Attraction

from the album The First of a Million Kisses
- B-side: "Mythology"; "Falling Backwards"; "Mystery Train"
- Released: 21 March 1988
- Length: 3:36
- Label: RCA
- Songwriter: Mark E. Nevin
- Producers: Fairground Attraction; Kevin Moloney

Fairground Attraction singles chronology
"Perfect" (1988)	"Find My Love" (1988)

Music video
- "Perfect" on YouTube

"Perfect" is the debut single by the British folk and soft rock band Fairground Attraction, written by Mark E. Nevin. Released on 21 March 1988 by RCA Records, the single reached number one in the United Kingdom on the week of 8 May 1988. It also reached number one in Australia, Ireland, and South Africa. In the United States, the song peaked at number 80 on the Billboard Hot 100. "Perfect" won the award for British Single of the Year at the Brit Awards 1989 and was nominated for the Ivor Novello 'Best Song Musically and Lyrically' award.

== Release ==
In the UK, "Perfect" was released as a 7-inch single, 12-inch single, and CD single. The song was included on the band's debut studio album, The First of a Million Kisses, released later the same year. A version of the song with a different vocalist was used in television advertising for the British supermarket chain Asda in the late 1980s and early 1990s. It was re-released as a single in 1993 after it had reappeared on the compilation album Celtic Heart but this time included "Captured" by Brian Kennedy in the tracklisting.

== Critical reception ==
Tony Reed from Melody Maker wrote, "Acoustic folky rockabilly, and a brilliant, brilliant woman singing it. A minor triumph, to be sure, but for what it is — perfect." Neil Taylor from NME said, "Pop seems to be the order of the day in this pile and this single is one of the best. Eddi Reader's confident, strident vocal sounds like a mish-mash of country and high glitz, but a strong backbeat pulls the record into the safety zone of rock."

== Track listings ==
- 7-inch single
  1. "Perfect" – 3:33
  2. "Mythology" – 4:30
- 12-inch and CD single
  1. "Perfect" – 3:33
  2. "Falling Backwards" – 2:25
  3. "Mythology" – 4:30
  4. "Mystery Train" – 1:40
- 7-inch single (1993)
  1. "Perfect"
  2. "Captured" (Brian Kennedy)
- CD single (1993)
  1. "Perfect"
  2. "Walkin' After Midnight"
  3. "You Send Me"
  4. "Captured" (Brian Kennedy)

== Charts ==
=== Weekly charts ===
Chart (1988–1989)	Peak position
Australia (ARIA)	1
Austria (Ö3 Austria Top 40)	19
Belgium (Ultratop 50 Flanders)	4
Denmark (IFPI)	2
Europe (Eurochart Hot 100)	2
Europe (European Airplay Top 50)	1
Finland (Suomen virallinen lista)	22
France (SNEP)	50
Ireland (IRMA)	1
Italy Airplay (Music & Media)	16
Netherlands (Dutch Top 40)	3
Netherlands (Single Top 100)	5
New Zealand (Recorded Music NZ)	4
Norway (VG-lista)	10
South Africa (Springbok Radio)	1
Spain (AFYVE)	1
Sweden (Sverigetopplistan)	2
Switzerland (Schweizer Hitparade)	5
UK Singles (Official Charts)	1
US Billboard Hot 100	80
US Adult Contemporary (Billboard)	31
US Hot Country Singles (Billboard)	85
US Modern Rock Tracks (Billboard)	23
West Germany (GfK)	5

=== Year-end charts ===
Chart (1988)	Position
Australia (ARIA)	6
Belgium (Ultratop)	49
Europe (Eurochart Hot 100)	33
Europe (European Airplay Top 50)	6
Netherlands (Dutch Top 40)	35
Netherlands (Single Top 100)	87
New Zealand (RIANZ)	29
South Africa (Springbok Radio)	5
UK Singles (OCC)	13
West Germany (Media Control)	45

== Certifications ==
Region	Certification	Certified units/sales
New Zealand (RMNZ)	Gold	15,000^{‡}
Sweden (GLF)	Gold	25,000^{^}
United Kingdom (BPI)	Silver	250,000^{^}
^{^} Shipments figures based on certification alone.^{‡} Sales+streaming figures based on certification alone.

== Baillie & the Boys version ==
"Perfect"

Single by Baillie & the Boys

from the album The Lights of Home
- B-side: "Lovin' by Numbers"
- Released: 14 April 1990
- Genre: Country
- Length: 2:57
- Label: RCA
- Songwriter: Mark E. Nevin
- Producer: Kyle Lehning

Baillie & the Boys singles chronology
"I Can't Turn the Tide" (1989)	"Perfect" (1990)	"Fool Such as I" (1990)

American country music group Baillie & the Boys released their version in April 1990 as the first single from their third studio album The Lights of Home. The song reached number 23 on the Billboard Hot Country Singles & Tracks chart.

=== Charts ===
Chart (1990)	Peak position
Canada Country Singles (RPM)	16
US Country Songs (Billboard)	23
