= Fairground Attraction =

British folk/soft rock band

- left to right: Reader, Dodds, Edwards, Nevin

Background information
- Origin: London, England
- Genres: Folk; skiffle; soft rock
- Years active: 1987–1990; 2024–present
- Label: RCA
- Members: Eddi Reader; Mark E. Nevin; Simon Edwards; Roy Dodds
- Past members: Pete Geddis; Andrew Davies
- Website: fairground-attraction.co.uk

Fairground Attraction are a British folk and soft rock band. They are best known for the 1988 hits "Perfect" and "Find My Love", both from their debut studio album The First of a Million Kisses. The band won two Brit Awards in 1989, but broke up the following year to pursue solo careers. They reformed in 2024.

== Career ==
Fairground Attraction were formed in London in the mid-1980s, consisting of Mark Nevin, Eddi Reader, Simon Edwards and Roy Dodds. The sound they developed together blends elements of folk, jazz, country, and cajun styles.

In 1987, they were signed to RCA Records. Their first single, "Perfect", was an immediate success and reached number one on the UK Singles Chart. It was also nominated for the prestigious Ivor Novello 'Best Song Musically and Lyrically' award.

The album The First of a Million Kisses followed in 1988, with all but one of its songs written by guitarist Nevin. It entered the UK Albums Chart at #3 and peaked at #2, eventually being certified double platinum. RCA released three other singles from the album: "Find My Love" (which reached #7), "A Smile in a Whisper", and "Clare". At the 1989 BRIT Awards, "Perfect" won Best British Single, and The First of a Million Kisses won Best British Album. The group found an especially devoted following in Japan, where they toured in 1989.

The band split up in January 1990, whilst in the midst of recording a follow-up album. Reader and Nevin do not agree on what prompted their disbanding. The album Ay Fond Kiss was released by RCA in June of that year, but it was not the intended second album the band had been working on. Instead, it was a compilation of B-sides and other material recorded alongside their first album, many being collaborations by just two band members. A cover of Patsy Cline's "Walkin' After Midnight" was released as a single, and achieved minor chart success in the UK.

Nevin later recorded material intended for the original second album with Brian Kennedy, and released it under the name Sweetmouth in 1991. He later worked with Morrissey, co-writing most of the Kill Uncle album. He also worked with Kirsty MacColl again, before embarking on his own solo career. Reader continued to perform as a solo artist, performing Fairground Attraction songs as well as her solo songs, occasionally working with Nevin over the years.

In December 2023, Reader announced on her Facebook page that Fairground Attraction would reform for a Japanese tour in 2024. The band subsequently announced new music and a UK tour on the band's Facebook page. They debuted a new single, "What's Wrong with the World?" on 24 March 2024, followed on 12 June with the title track of their second studio album Beautiful Happening. The album was released in September 2024, over 36 years after The First of a Million Kisses.

== Personnel ==
- Eddi Reader – vocals, acoustic guitar, concertina
- Mark E. Nevin – electric and acoustic guitars
- Simon Edwards – guitarrón
- Roy Dodds – drums, percussion
- Pete Geddis – guitar
- Andrew Davies – drums

=== Tour personnel ===
- Roger Beaujolais – percussion
- Graham Henderson – percussion, accordion, acoustic guitar, mandolin, piano

== Discography ==
=== Studio albums ===
Title	Album details	Peak chart positions											Certifications
Title	Album details	UK	AUS	AUT	CAN	FIN	GER	NED	NZ	SWE	SWI	US	Certifications
The First of a Million Kisses	Released: 16 May 1988; Label: RCA	2	9	17	57	13	38	29	19	6	18	137	UK: 2× Platinum
Ay Fond Kiss	Released: 18 June 1990; Label: RCA	55	—	—	—	—	—	—	—	—	—	—	
Beautiful Happening	Released: 20 September 2024; Label: Absolute	—	—	—	—	—	—	—	—	—	—	—	
"—" denotes items that did not chart or were not released in that territory.

=== Compilation albums ===
- The Collection: Fairground Attraction, featuring Eddi Reader (1994)
- Perfect: The Best of Fairground Attraction (1995)
- The Very Best of Fairground Attraction, featuring Eddi Reader (1996)
- The Masters (1997)
- 80s Eternal Best: Fairground Attraction Best (1998)
- The Very Best of Fairground Attraction (2004)

=== Live albums ===
- Kawasaki Live in Japan 02.07.89 (2003)
- Beautiful Happening Live in Japan (2025)

=== Singles ===
Year	Title	Peak chart positions											Certifications	Album
Year	Title	UK	AUS	AUT	BEL	GER	IRE	NED	NZ	SWE	SWI	US	Certifications	Album
1988	"Perfect"	1	1	19	4	5	1	5	4	2	5	80	BPI: Silver; GLF: Gold	The First of a Million Kisses
1988	"Find My Love"	7	86	3	24	22	6	30	34	—	—	—		The First of a Million Kisses
1988	"A Smile in a Whisper"	75	—	—	—	—	—	—	—	—	—	—		The First of a Million Kisses
1989	"Clare"	49	—	—	—	—	—	—	—	—	—	—		The First of a Million Kisses
1990	"Walking After Midnight"	97	—	—	—	—	—	—	—	—	—	—		Ay Fond Kiss
2024	"What's Wrong with the World?"	—	—	—	—	—	—	—	—	—	—	—		Beautiful Happening
2024	"Beautiful Happening"	—	—	—	—	—	—	—	—	—	—	—		Beautiful Happening
"—" denotes items that did not chart or were not released in that territory.

=== Videos ===
- The First of a Million Kisses (1990)

Collection of music videos: "Perfect", "Find My Love", "A Smile in a Whisper", "Clare"

- Live at Full House (1990)

Live performances from German television show called Live at Full House

== Awards and nominations ==
Year	Awards	Work	Category	Result
1988	Smash Hits Poll Winners Party	Themselves	Most Promising New Act	Nominated
1989	Silver Clef Award	Themselves	Best Newcomer	Won
1989	Ivor Novello Awards	"Perfect"	Best Song Musically & Lyrically	Nominated
1989	BRIT Awards	"Perfect"	Best British Single	Won
1989	BRIT Awards	The First of a Million Kisses	Best British Album	Won
