= Tears for Fears discography =

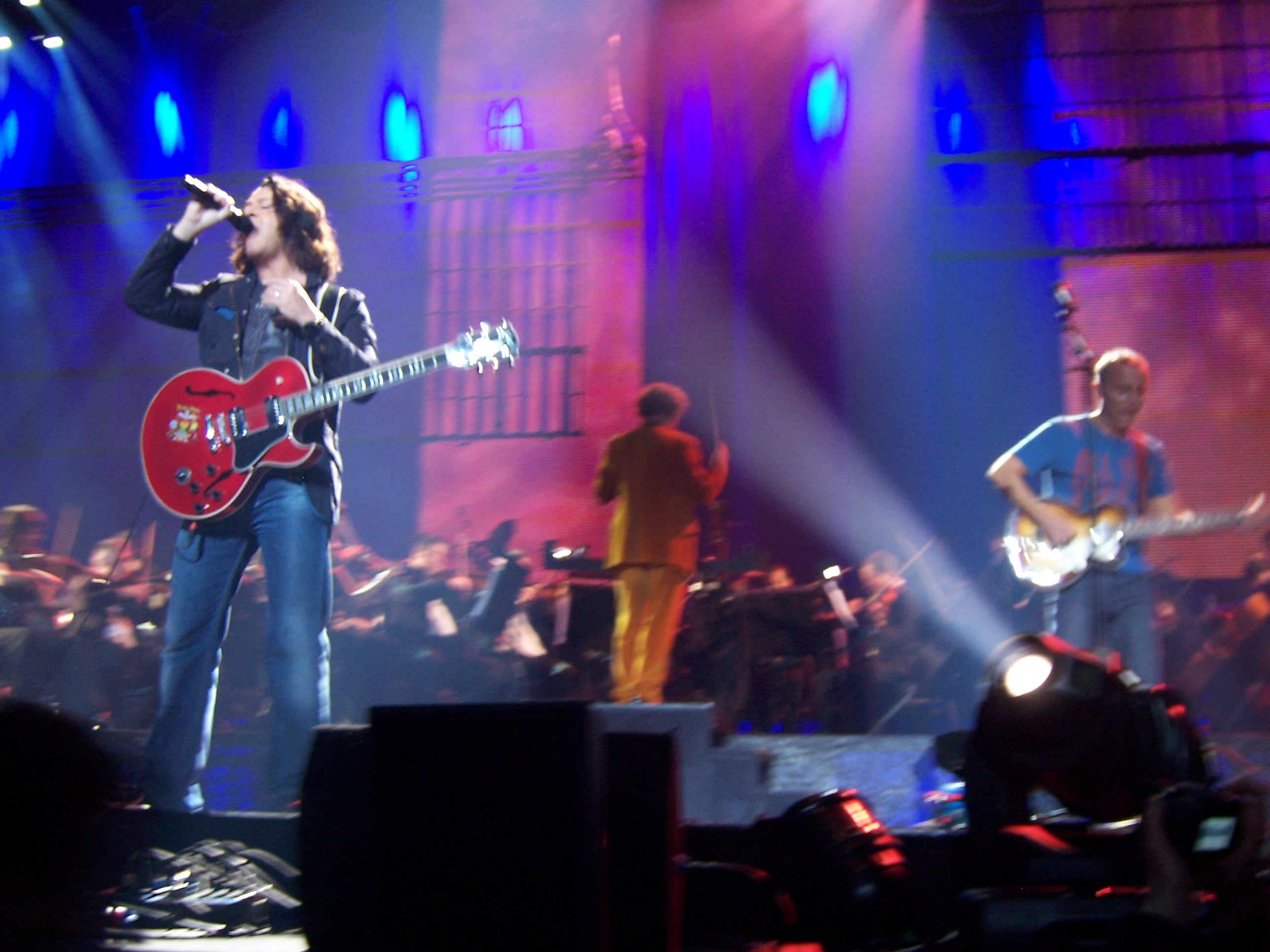
- Roland Orzabal (left) and Curt Smith (right) performing in Hanover, 2008
- Studio albums: 7
- Extended plays: 1
- Live albums: 3
- Compilation albums: 3
- Singles: 44
- Video albums: 10
- Music videos: 30
- Box sets: 4
- Other compilation albums: 22

The English new wave and pop rock band Tears for Fears have released seven studio albums, along with numerous singles, compilations and videos. Formed in 1981 by Roland Orzabal and Curt Smith, the duo signed to Phonogram Records in the UK and released their first single the same year. It was not until Tears for Fears' third single, "Mad World" (1982), that they scored their first hit, and their platinum-selling debut studio album The Hurting (1983) was a UK number one.

Their second studio album, Songs from the Big Chair, was released in 1985 and became a worldwide hit, establishing the band in the US. After a third platinum-selling studio album, The Seeds of Love (1989), Smith and Orzabal parted company. The band's first greatest hits album was released in 1992 and went double platinum in the UK. Subsequent Tears for Fears studio albums Elemental (1993) and Raoul and the Kings of Spain (1995) were effectively solo albums by Orzabal. However, the duo reformed in 2000 for a new studio album, Everybody Loves a Happy Ending, which was released in 2004/05. Although continuing to tour regularly across the world, the band's recording output slowed down for several years. A new compilation album, Rule the World: The Greatest Hits, was released in 2017, giving the band their sixth UK Top 20 album. After a lengthy development, the band's seventh studio album, The Tipping Point, was released in February 2022, peaking at number two in the UK - their highest charting album in thirty years. Songs for a Nervous Planet, a live double album featuring several brand new studio tracks, was released in 2024, giving the band their seventh UK Top Ten album.

== Albums ==
=== Studio albums ===
Title	Details	Peak chart positions										Certifications
Title	Details	UK	AUS	CAN	FRA	GER	ITA	NL	NZ	SWI	US	Certifications
The Hurting	Released: 11 March 1983; Label: Mercury/Phonogram; Formats: LP, MC	1	15	7	16	15	—	30	16	—	73	UK: Platinum; CAN: Platinum; FRA: Gold; US: Gold
Songs from the Big Chair	Released: 1 March 1985; Label: Mercury/Phonogram; Formats: CD, LP, MC	2	5	1	12	1	6	1	2	5	1	UK: 3× Platinum; CAN: 7× Platinum; FRA: Gold; GER: Gold; NL: Platinum; NZ: 2× Platinum; US: 5× Platinum
The Seeds of Love	Released: 25 September 1989; Label: Fontana; Formats: CD, LP, MC	1	18	5	3	5	5	7	4	8	8	UK: Platinum; AUS: Gold; CAN: 2× Platinum; FRA: Platinum; GER: Gold; NL: Gold; NZ: Gold; SWI: Gold; US: Platinum
Elemental	Released: 7 June 1993; Label: Mercury/Phonogram; Formats: CD, LP, MC, DCC	5	56	18	5	26	10	31	—	24	45	UK: Silver; CAN: Gold; FRA: Gold; US: Gold
Raoul and the Kings of Spain	Released: 16 October 1995; Label: Epic; Formats: CD, MC, MD	41	—	62	5	88	23	70	—	42	79	
Everybody Loves a Happy Ending	Released: 14 September 2004 (US)/7 March 2005 (UK); Label: New Door, Gut; Formats: CD	45	—	—	28	35	68	86	—	48	46	
The Tipping Point	Released: 25 February 2022; Label: Concord; Formats: CD, LP, MC, Blu-ray, digital download	2	7	20	10	3	14	5	—	4	8	
"—" denotes a recording that did not chart or was not released in that territory.

=== Live albums ===
Title	Details	Peak chart positions				
Title	Details	UK	FRA	ITA	NL	US
Secret World – Live in Paris	Released: 27 February 2006; Label: XIII Bis; Formats: CD+DVD; France-only release	—	106	—	—	—
Live at Massey Hall Toronto, Canada / 1985	Released: 12 June 2021; Label: UMC/Mercury; Formats: CD, 2×LP, digital download	—	—	—	—	—
Songs for a Nervous Planet	Released: 25 October 2024; Label: Concord; Formats: 2×CD, 2×LP, Blu-ray, digital download	6	37	72	58	104
"—" denotes a recording that did not chart or was not released in that territory.

=== Compilation albums ===
Title	Details	Peak chart positions										Certifications
Title	Details	UK	AUS	CAN	FRA	GER	ITA	NL	NZ	SWI	US	Certifications
Tears Roll Down (Greatest Hits 82–92)	Released: 2 March 1992; Label: Fontana, Mercury; Formats: CD, LP, MC, DCC	2	101	19	2 (Note: Peak position on the Compilations Chart)	7	1	22	9	14	53	UK: 2× Platinum; CAN: Gold; FRA: Gold; GER: Gold; ITA: Gold; NZ: Platinum; SWI: Gold; US: Platinum
Saturnine Martial & Lunatic	Released: 3 June 1996; Label: Fontana; Formats: CD, MC, 2×LP	—	—	—	—	—	—	—	—	—	—	
Rule the World: The Greatest Hits	Released: 10 November 2017; Label: Virgin EMI; Formats: CD, 2×LP, digital download	12	—	—	—	—	—	—	—	87	—	UK: Platinum
"—" denotes a recording that did not chart or was not released in that territory.

==== Other compilations ====
(The following compilations tended to be regional releases, issued without the band's involvement and often on "budget price" labels)

Title	Details	Certifications
Everybody Wants to Mix the World	Released: 1986; Label: Mercury/PolyGram; Formats: LP, MC; Argentina-only collection of remixes	
Tears Laid Low (A Tears for Fears Alter Collection)	Released: 1992; Label: Fontana; Formats: CD; Canada limited promo-only release of B-sides	
20th Century Masters – The Millennium Collection: The Best of Tears for Fears	Released: 27 June 2000; Label: Mercury; Formats: CD; US and Canada-only release	
Media Markt Präsentiert Tears for Fears	Released: October 2000; Label: Mercury; Formats: CD; Germany-only release	
Classic Tears for Fears: The Universal Masters Collection	Released: November 2000; Label: Mercury; Formats: CD; Reissued in Japan in 2001 as The Best of Tears for Fears – Superstar Collection, in Germany as Millennium Edition and 2004 in Germany again as Popstars of the 20th Century	
Shout	Released: January 2001; Label: Mercury/Universal; Formats: CD; Germany-only release	
The Working Hour: An Introduction to Tears for Fears	Released: 26 March 2001; Label: Mercury; Formats: CD	
Shout: The Very Best of Tears for Fears	Released: 25 September 2001; Label: Mercury; Formats: CD; US-only release	
Gold	Released: 2001; Label: Mercury; Formats: CD; Brazil-only release	
The Best of Remixes	Released: 5 June 2002; Label: Mercury; Formats: CD; Japan-only release	
The Ultimate Collection	Released: February 2003; Label: Universal; Formats: 3×CD	
The Collection	Released: 13 October 2003; Label: Spectrum Music; Formats: CD	UK: Silver
Gold	Released: 8 August 2006; Label: Hip-O/Mercury; Formats: 2×CD	
The Collection	Released: November 2006; Label: Brunswick News/Universal Music; Formats: CD; Europe-only release	
Sowing the Seeds of Love: The Best of Tears for Fears	Released: 2006; Label: Brunswick News/Universal Music; Formats: 2×CD; Germany-only release	
Famous Last Words: The Collection	Released: 14 May 2007; Label: Spectrum Music; Formats: 2×CD	
The Silver Collection	Released: June 2007; Label: Spectrum Music; Formats: CD; Europe-only release	
The Essential Collection	Released: 2008; Label: Spectrum Music/Woolworths Worthit!; Formats: CD	
Die Grössten Hits	Released: 2008; Label: Mercury/Universal Music; Formats: CD; Germany-only release	
Mad World: The Collection	Released: 18 October 2010; Label: Spectrum Music/Universal; Formats: 2×CD	
Everybody Wants to Rule the World: The Collection	Released: 26 August 2013; Label: Spectrum Music; Formats: CD	
Icon	Released: 5 August 2014; Label: Mercury; Formats: CD	

=== Box sets ===
Title	Details
Collusion	Released: 25 June 1991; Label: Fontana; Formats: 4×CD; Japan-only release
Songs from the Big Chair / The Hurting	Released: 1997; Label: Mercury; Formats: 2×CD
The Hurting / Sowing the Seeds of Love	Released: 2000; Label: Mercury; Formats: 2×CD
3 Original CDs	Released: 2003; Label: Mercury; Formats: 3×CD

== Extended plays ==
Title	Details
Ready Boy & Girls?	Released: 19 April 2014; Label: Ingrooves; Formats: 10″; Record Store Day release

== Singles ==
Title	Year	Peak chart positions											Certifications	Album
Title	Year	UK	AUS	BEL (FL)	CAN	FRA	GER	IRE	ITA	NL	NZ	US	Certifications	Album
"Suffer the Children"	1981	—	—	—	—	—	—	—	—	—	—	—		The Hurting
"Pale Shelter (You Don't Give Me Love)" (Note: The 1982 Mike Howlett-produced version of "Pale Shelter (You Don't Give Me Love)" was eventually issued as a single in Canada in 1983, and peaked at #12. In other territories, the hit single was the 1983 version of "Pale Shelter". This version was a wholly new recording produced by Chris Hughes and Ross Cullum, and it did not include the parenthetical subtitle.)	1982	—	—	—	12	—	—	—	—	—	—	—		The Hurting
"Mad World"	1982	3	12	—	—	73 (Note: Chart position is from 2013.)	21	6	—	—	25	—	UK: Gold	The Hurting
"Change"	1983	4	29	30	23	—	—	8	14	32	36	73	UK: Silver	The Hurting
"Pale Shelter" (1983 version)	1983	5	—	—	—	—	25	5	—	—	—	—		The Hurting
"The Way You Are"	1983	24	—	—	—	—	—	—	—	—	—	—		Non-album single
"Mothers Talk"	1984	14	—	—	—	—	—	23	—	—	50	—		Songs from the Big Chair
"Shout"	1984	4	1	1	1	21	1	5	2	1	1	1 (Note: In the US, "Everybody Wants to Rule the World" was the first single release from Songs from the Big Chair followed by "Shout".)	UK: Gold; CAN: Platinum; NZ: Gold; US: Gold; US: Gold (digital)	Songs from the Big Chair
"Everybody Wants to Rule the World"	1985	2	2	3	1	18	11	2	12	2	1	1	UK: 5× Platinum; AUS: 5× Platinum; CAN: Gold; GER: Platinum; IT: Platinum; NZ: Gold	Songs from the Big Chair
"Head over Heels"	1985	12	21	18	8	—	55	5	—	29	12	3	UK: Gold	Songs from the Big Chair
"Suffer the Children" (reissue)	1985	52	—	—	—	—	—	—	—	—	—	—		The Hurting
"Pale Shelter (You Don't Give Me Love)" (reissue)	1985	73	—	—	—	—	—	—	—	—	—	—		The Hurting
"I Believe (A Soulful Re-Recording)"	1985	23	—	—	—	—	—	10	—	—	28	—		Songs from the Big Chair
"Mothers Talk" (US remix)	1986	—	—	—	87	—	—	—	—	—	—	27		Songs from the Big Chair
"Everybody Wants to Run the World"	1986	5	—	—	—	—	—	4	—	—	—	—		Non-album single
"Sowing the Seeds of Love"	1989	5	13	11	1	18	11	4	2	3	4	2	UK: Silver	The Seeds of Love
"Woman in Chains" (featuring Oleta Adams)	1989	26	39	32	11	20	45	21	14	16	34	36	UK: Silver	The Seeds of Love
"Advice for the Young at Heart"	1990	36	116	34	25	31	51	15	49	22	—	89		The Seeds of Love
"Famous Last Words"	1990	83	—	—	—	—	—	—	—	—	—	—		The Seeds of Love
"Johnny Panic and the Bible of Dreams" (Note: Though not formally credited to Tears for Fears, "Johnny Panic and the Bible of Dreams" was originally the B-side to "Advice for the Young at Heart". It was then remixed by Fluke and released as a single by Tears for Fears' record company in the UK and simply credited to 'Johnny Panic and the Bible of Dreams'. The single also reached number 1 on the UK Dance Chart.)	1991	70	152	—	—	—	—	—	—	—	—	—		Non-album single
"Laid So Low (Tears Roll Down)"	1992	17	130	49	28	15	40	—	6	27	—	— (Note: "Laid So Low" reached number 10 on the US Billboard Modern Rock Tracks chart.)		Tears Roll Down (Greatest Hits 82–92)
"Woman in Chains" (reissue)	1992	57	—	—	—	—	—	—	—	—	—	—		Tears Roll Down (Greatest Hits 82–92)
"Break It Down Again"	1993	20	82	49	4	19	66	—	10	27	—	25		Elemental
"Cold"	1993	72	—	—	—	—	—	—	—	—	—	—		Elemental
"Goodnight Song" (Note: "Goodnight Song" was released as a single in North America and some European countries. It was also released as a promo-only single in the UK.)	1993	—	—	—	44	—	—	—	—	—	—	125		Elemental
"Elemental" (Note: "Elemental" was only released as a single in France and the US.)	1994	—	—	—	—	—	—	—	—	—	—	—		Elemental
"Raoul and the Kings of Spain"	1995	31	—	39	—	—	80	—	—	—	—	—		Raoul and the Kings of Spain
"God's Mistake"	1995	61	—	—	48	—	—	—	—	—	—	102		Raoul and the Kings of Spain
"Falling Down"	1995	—	—	—	—	—	—	—	—	—	—	—		Raoul and the Kings of Spain
"Secrets" (Note: Whilst "Secrets" was released as a single elsewhere, it was withdrawn from release in the UK.)	1996	—	—	—	—	—	—	—	—	—	—	—		Raoul and the Kings of Spain
"Call Me Mellow" (Note: "Call Me Mellow" was released as a promo-only single in North America in 2004 and in the UK and Germany in 2005. However, it did get a commercial release in a Italy in early 2005.)	2004	—	—	—	—	—	—	—	45	—	—	— (Note: "Call Me Mellow" reached #28 on the US Billboard Adult Top 40 chart.)		Everybody Loves a Happy Ending
"Closest Thing to Heaven"	2005	40	—	64	—	—	—	—	—	70	—	—		Everybody Loves a Happy Ending
"Everybody Loves a Happy Ending" / "Call Me Mellow"	2005	102 (Note: "Everybody Loves A Happy Ending/Call Me Mellow" reached #79 on the UK Physical Singles Chart and #13 on the UK Independent Singles Chart in June 2005.)	—	—	—	—	—	—	—	—	—	—		Everybody Loves a Happy Ending
"Secret World" (Note: "Secret World" was released as a promo-only single in France.)	2006	—	—	—	—	—	—	—	—	—	—	—		Secret World – Live in Paris
"I Love You but I'm Lost"	2017	—	—	—	—	—	—	—	—	—	—	—		Rule the World: The Greatest Hits
"The Tipping Point"	2021	— (Note: "The Tipping Point" reached #36 on the UK Singles Downloads Chart. and #37 on the UK Singles Sales Chart in October 2021.)	—	—	—	—	—	—	—	—	—	— (Note: "The Tipping Point" reached #17 on the US Billboard Adult Alternative Songs Chart, #17 on the US Billboard Alternative Digital Song Sales Chart and #19 on the US Billboard Rock Digital Song Sales Chart. between October 2021 and January 2022.)		The Tipping Point
"No Small Thing"	2021	—	—	—	—	—	—	—	—	—	—	—		The Tipping Point
"Break the Man"	2022	—	—	—	—	—	—	—	—	—	—	—		The Tipping Point
"My Demons"	2022	—	—	—	—	—	—	—	—	—	—	—		The Tipping Point
"Long, Long, Long Time"	2022	—	—	—	—	—	—	—	—	—	—	—		The Tipping Point
"Rivers of Mercy"	2023	—	—	—	—	—	—	—	—	—	—	—		The Tipping Point
"The Girl That I Call Home"	2024	— (Note: "The Girl That I Call Home" reached #93 on the UK Singles Downloads Chart in November 2024..)	—	—	—	—	—	—	—	—	—	—		Songs for a Nervous Planet
"Astronaut"	2024	—	—	—	—	—	—	—	—	—	—	—		Songs for a Nervous Planet
"Say Goodbye to Mum and Dad"	2024	—	—	—	—	—	—	—	—	—	—	—		Songs for a Nervous Planet
"—" denotes a recording that did not chart or was not released in that territory.

== Collaborations and other appearances ==
Year	Album/single	Collaborator	Comment
1990	Knebworth: The Album	Various Artists	The live album contains the songs "Everybody Wants To Rule The World" and "Badmans Song"
1992	Ruby Trax: The NME's Roaring Forty	Various Artists	The album contains the cover of "Ashes to Ashes" which was later included on the Saturnine Martial & Lunatic

== Videos ==
=== Video albums ===
Title	Details
The Videosingles	Released: May 1983; Label: PolyGram Music Video; Formats: VHS, Beta, LD
In My Mind's Eye	Released: 12 October 1984; Label: PolyGram Music Video; Formats: VHS, Beta, LD
Scenes from the Big Chair	Released: November 1985; Label: PolyGram Music Video; Formats: VHS, Beta, LD
Sowing the Seeds	Released: March 1990; Label: Channel 5/PolyGram Music Video; Formats: VHS, LD
Going to California	Released: 8 October 1990; Label: PolyGram Music Video; Formats: VHS, LD
Knebworth '90	Released: 1991; Label: Castle Music Pictures; Formats: VHS
Tears Roll Down (Greatest Hits 82–92)	Released: March 1992; Label: PolyGram Music Video; Formats: VHS, LD
20th Century Masters: The DVD Collection – The Best of Tears for Fears	Released: 24 February 2004; Label: Mercury; Formats: DVD
Classic – The Universal Masters DVD Collection	Released: 2005; Label: Mercury/Universal; Formats: DVD
Gold: The Videos	Released: May 2007; Label: Universal; Formats: DVD

=== Music videos ===
Title	Year	Director(s)
"Mad World"	1982	Clive Richardson
"Change"	1983	Clive Richardson
"Pale Shelter"	1983	Steve Barron
"The Way You Are"	1983	Unknown
"Mothers Talk" (version 1)	1984	Laurie Lewis
"Mothers Talk" (version 2)	1984	Nigel Dick
"Shout"	1984	Nigel Dick
"Everybody Wants to Rule the World"	1985	Nigel Dick
"Head over Heels"	1985	Nigel Dick
"I Believe"	1985	Nigel Dick
"Mothers Talk" (US remix)	1986	Nigel Dick
"Sowing the Seeds of Love"	1989	Jim Blashfield
"Woman in Chains"	1989	Andy Morahan
"Advice for the Young at Heart"	1990	Andy Morahan
"Famous Last Words"	1990	Nigel Dick
"Laid So Low (Tears Roll Down)"	1992	Paul Donnellon
"Break It Down Again"	1993	Dani Jacobs
"Cold"	1993	Unknown
"Goodnight Song"	1993	Dani Jacobs
"Elemental"	1994	Samuel Bayer
"Raoul and the Kings of Spain"	1995	Cameron Casey
"God's Mistake"	1995	Cameron Casey
"Secrets" (version 1)	1996	Cameron Casey
"Secrets" (version 2)	1996	Roland Orzabal
"Falling Down"	1996	Roland Orzabal
"Closest Thing to Heaven"	2005	Michael Palmieri
"I Love You but I'm Lost"	2017	Morgan Freed
"The Tipping Point"	2021	Matt Mahurin
"No Small Thing"	2021	Vern Moen
"Break the Man"	2022	WeWereMonkeys
"My Demons"	2022	Heather Gildroy
"Long, Long, Long Time"	2022	Heather Gildroy and Justin Daashuur Hopkins
"The Girl That I Call Home"	2024	Maschima
"Astronaut"	2024	Maschima
