= Classic Tears for Fears: The Universal Masters Collection =

2000 compilation album by Tears for Fears

Compilation album by Tears for Fears
- Released: November 2000
- Genre: Alternative rock; new wave; synth-pop
- Length: 1:18:48
- Label: Universal

Tears for Fears chronology
20th Century Masters – The Millennium Collection: The Best of Tears for Fears (2000)	Classic Tears for Fears: The Universal Masters Collection (2000)	Shout: The Very Best of Tears for Fears (2001)

Classic Tears for Fears: The Universal Masters Collection is a compilation album by the English rock band Tears for Fears. The album has been reissued under various different names, including Popstars of the 20th Century and The Best of Tears for Fears – Superstar Collection.

== Critical reception ==
Andy Kellman, a reviewer for the music website AllMusic called it "woefully unrepresentative" as it omits songs from their debut album The Hurting, going on to say that both the listener and the band deserve better. Kellman also criticized the reissue, Superstar Collection, stating that "someone went to a home-designing retailer, used a picture of one of the marble tile samples, slapped on a press photo, and dolled it up with a cheap-looking gold border" and calling the rest of the album "slipshod".

== Track listing ==
1. "Break It Down Again"
2. "Shout"
3. "Goodnight Song"
4. "Badman's Song"
5. "Power"
6. "Cold"
7. "Dog's a Friend's Best Dog"
8. "Swords and Knives"
9. "Famous Last Words"
10. "Mothers Talk" (US remix)
11. "Head over Heels"
12. "Advice for the Young at Heart"
13. "Everybody Wants to Rule the World"
14. "Sowing the Seeds of Love"
15. "Woman in Chains"

== Personnel ==
According to MusicBrainz:

Bass guitar:	Pino Palladino (track 4) Curt Smith (in 1984) (tracks 2, 13)
Drums (drum set):	Manny Elias (in 1984) (tracks 2, 13) Chris Hughes (Producer. aka Merrick) (in 1984) (track 2)
Guitar and solo guitar:	Neil Taylor (guitarist) (in 1984) (track 13)
Guitar and slide guitar:	Robbie McIntosh (English guitarist for The Pretenders) (track 4)
Hammond organ:	Simon Clark (UK keyboard and synthesizer player) (track 12) Ian Stanley (track 14)
Hammond organ and synthesizer:	Simon Clark (UK keyboard and synthesizer player) (track 4)
Keyboard:	Ian Stanley (in 1984) (tracks 2, 13)
Membranophone:	Phil Collins (of Genesis) (track 15) Manu Katché (track 4)
Piano:	Oleta Adams (track 4) Nicky Holland (track 12)
Additional vocals:	Nicky Holland (tracks 4, 12) Carol Kenyon (track 4) Tessa Niles (track 4) Maggie Ryder (track 12)
background vocals:	Roland Orzabal (in 1984) (track 13) Sandy McLelland (in 1984) (track 2)
Guest lead vocals:	Oleta Adams (tracks 4, 15)
Lead vocals:	Curt Smith (track 13) Roland Orzabal (in 1984) (track 2)

== Classic Tears for Fears: The Universal Masters DVD Collection ==
Classic Tears for Fears: The Universal Masters DVD Collection

Video by Tears for Fears
- Released: 9 August 2005
- Genre: Pop
- Label: Mercury; Universal

Tears for Fears chronology
20th Century Masters – The DVD Collection: The Best of Tears for Fears (2004)	Classic Tears for Fears: The Universal Masters DVD Collection (2005)	Gold: The Videos (2007)

Professional ratings
Review scores
Source	Rating
KCUniversal	4/5 stars

A DVD compilation album was released with every song off the album included on the DVD.

=== Track listing ===
Track listing according to AllMusic:

1. "Break It Down Again"
2. "Shout"
3. "Goodnight Song"
4. "Badman's Song"
5. "Power"
6. "Cold"
7. "Dog's a Friend's Best Dog"
8. "Swords and Knives"
9. "Famous Last Words"
10. "Mothers Talk" (US remix)
11. "Head over Heels"
12. "Advice for the Young at Heart"
13. "Everybody Wants to Rule the World"
14. "Sowing the Seeds of Love"
15. "Woman in Chains"
