= Shout: The Very Best of Tears for Fears =

Compilation album by Tears for Fears
- Released: 25 September 2001
- Recorded: 1981–1993
- Length: 79:07
- Label: Mercury Records
- Producer: Mike Ragogna

Tears for Fears chronology
Classic Tears for Fears: The Universal Masters Collection (2001)	Shout: The Very Best of Tears for Fears (2001)	The Collection (2003)

Shout: The Very Best of Tears for Fears is a 2001 compilation album released by the English band Tears for Fears. The album contains the greatest hits of the band from their first album, The Hurting, to the much later Elemental. The liner notes contain various photographs which were researched by Jason Pastori and coordinated by Ryan Null.

== Reception ==
Professional ratings
Review scores
Source	Rating
AllMusic	4.5/5 stars
PopMatters	Favourable
The Encyclopedia of Popular Music	3/5 stars

In an AllMusic review, Jose F. Promis says "Shout: The Very Best of Tears for Fears provides an excellent overview of the band's key tracks" with the set improving upon their previous compilation (1992's Tears Roll Down) by including an additional five tracks. He concludes by stating it "stands as the definitive Tears for Fears collection". Mike Duquette of the Second Disc states that it is the "best single disc TFF set for your money" and that "It's inexplicable as to why a generic 20th Century Masters disc was released almost simultaneously."

== Track listing ==
CD
No.	Title	Writer(s)	Length
1.	"Mad World"	Roland Orzabal	3:34
2.	"Change"	Orzabal	3:59
3.	"Pale Shelter"	Orzabal	4:26
4.	"The Way You Are"	Orzabal; Curt Smith; Manny Elias; Ian Stanley	4:55
5.	"Suffer the Children"	Orzabal	3:51
6.	"Mothers Talk (US remix)"	Orzabal; Stanley	4:18
7.	"Shout"	Orzabal; Stanley	6:32
8.	"Everybody Wants to Rule the World"	Orzabal; Stanley; Chris Hughes	4:08
9.	"Head over Heels"	Orzabal; Smith	4:15
10.	"I Believe (A Soulful Re-Recording)"	Orzabal	4:41
11.	"Sowing the Seeds of Love"	Orzabal; Smith	5:41
12.	"Woman in Chains"	Orzabal	6:28
13.	"Advice for the Young at Heart"	Orzabal; Nicky Holland	4:44
14.	"Laid So Low (Tears Roll Down)"	Orzabal; David Bascombe	4:41
15.	"Break It Down Again"	Orzabal; Alan Griffiths	4:32
16.	"New Star"	Orzabal; Griffiths	4:27
17.	"Goodnight Song"	Orzabal; Griffiths	3:53
Total length:			1:19:05

== Personnel ==
Adapted from AllMusic.

=== Tears for Fears ===
- Roland Orzabal – guitar, keyboards, vocals
- Curt Smith – bass, keyboards, vocals
- Ian Stanley – keyboards
- Manny Elias – drums

=== Additional contributors ===
- Chris Hughes – background vocals, drums
- Oleta Adams – vocals
- John Baker – background vocals
- Mel Collins – saxophone
- Phil Collins – drums
- Randy Jacobs – guitar
- Manu Katché – drums
- Mark O'Donoughue – Wurlitzer
- Caroline Orzabal – background vocals
- Pino Palladino – bass
- Simon Phillips – drums
- Neil Taylor – guitar
