= 20th Century Masters – The Millennium Collection: The Best of Tears for Fears =

2000 compilation album by Tears for Fears

Compilation album by Tears for Fears
- Released: 27 June 2000
- Genre: Pop rock
- Length: 55:42
- Label: Mercury

Tears for Fears chronology
Saturnine Martial & Lunatic (1996)	20th Century Masters – The Millennium Collection: The Best of Tears for Fears (2000)	Classic Tears for Fears: The Universal Masters Collection (2000)

20th Century Masters – The Millennium Collection: The Best of Tears for Fears is a compilation album by the English pop rock band Tears for Fears released by Mercury Records in the US and Canada only in 2000.

== Reception ==
Professional ratings
Review scores
Source	Rating
AllMusic	4/5 stars
The Encyclopedia of Popular Music	4/5 stars

Heather Phares of AllMusic calls The Millennium Collection a "concise but worthwhile look at Tears for Fears' diverse, ambitious pop sound."

== Track listing ==
Adapted from Classic Rock History.

No.	Title	Length
1.	"Everybody Wants to Rule the World"	4:10
2.	"Shout"	6:33
3.	"Sowing the Seeds of Love"	6:18
4.	"Head over Heels"	4:16
5.	"Woman in Chains"	6:29
6.	"Break It Down Again"	4:33
7.	"Mothers Talk"	4:18
8.	"I Believe"	4:41
9.	"Advice for the Young at Heart"	4:47
10.	"Change"	5:56
11.	"Pharaohs"	3:41
Total length:		55:42

== 20th Century Masters – The DVD Collection: The Best of Tears for Fears ==
20th Century Masters – The DVD Collection: The Best of Tears for Fears

Video by Tears for Fears
- Released: 24 February 2004
- Genre: Pop
- Length: 25 minutes
- Label: Mercury

Tears for Fears chronology
Tears Roll Down (Greatest Hits 82–92) (2003)	20th Century Masters – The DVD Collection: The Best of Tears for Fears (2004)	Classic Tears for Fears: The Universal Masters DVD Collection (2005)

A video compilation was released in 2004 for five of the album’s songs.

=== Critical reception ===
Professional ratings
Review scores
Source	Rating
KCUniversal	4/5 stars

In a review for AllMusic, Bret Adams said that it includes five of the "finest clips from the British duo" and that "this DVD will reignite interest in Tears for Fears' past and the reunion album set for 2004."

=== Track listing ===
No.	Title	Length
1.	"Shout"
2.	"Everybody Wants to Rule the World"
3.	"Mothers Talk"
4.	"Head over Heels"
5.	"Sowing the Seeds of Love"
