= The Collection (Tears for Fears album) =

Compilation album by Tears for Fears
- Released: 13 October 2003
- Genre: Pop rock
- Length: 1:19:44
- Label: Spectrum Music

Tears for Fears chronology
| Shout: The Very Best of Tears for Fears (2001) | The Collection (2003) | Everybody Loves a Happy Ending (2004) |

The Collection is a UK exclusive compilation album by the English pop band Tears for Fears, released on 13 October 2003 by Spectrum Music.

== Reception ==
Professional ratings
Review scores
| Source | Rating |
|---|---|
| AllMusic | 2.5/5 stars |
| The Encyclopedia of Popular Music | 2/5 stars |

Andy Kellman of AllMusic stated that the "natural inclination" was to compare the album to Shout: The Very Best of Tears for Fears. He goes on to state, "the selections are quite different, even though both include most of the obvious picks -- "Mad World," "Change," "Break It Down Again," "Sowing the Seeds of Love," "Advice for the Young at Heart." This set leaves off "Everybody Wants to Rule the World" and "Woman in Chains," which will be an instant turnoff for most, especially those in the U.S."

== Track listing ==
| No. | Title | Length |
|---|---|---|
| 1. | "Pharaohs" | 3:41 |
| 2. | "Shout" | 6:33 |
| 3. | "Mad World" | 3:33 |
| 4. | "Mothers Talk" | 3:57 |
| 5. | "The Working Hour" | 5:32 |
| 6. | "Sea Song" | 3:51 |
| 7. | "I Believe" | 4:55 |
| 8. | "Ideas as Opiates" | 3:47 |
| 9. | "Year of the Knife" | 7:05 |
| 10. | "Break It Down Again" | 4:32 |
| 11. | "Memories Fade" | 5:07 |
| 12. | "Empire Building" | 2:49 |
| 13. | "Brian Wilson Said" | 4:22 |
| 14. | "Sowing the Seeds of Love" | 6:15 |
| 15. | "Always in the Past" | 4:37 |
| 16. | "Change" | 4:17 |
| 17. | "Advice for the Young at Heart" | 4:51 |
| Total length: | | 1:19:44 |

== Certifications and sales ==
Certifications for The Collection
| Region | Certification | Certified units/sales |
|---|---|---|
| United Kingdom (BPI) | Silver | 60,000^{^} |
^{^} Shipments figures based on certification alone.
