= Going to California (Tears for Fears video) =

1990 concert video by Tears for Fears

Video by Tears for Fears
- Released: 8 October 1990
- Recorded: 26 May 1990
- Length: 90 minutes
- Labels: Fontana; PolyGram Music Video
- Director: Nigel Dick
- Producer: Lisa Hollingshead

Tears for Fears chronology
Sowing the Seeds (1990)	Going to California (1990)	Tears Roll Down (Greatest Hits 82–92) (1992)

Live from Santa Barbara

Live album by Tears for Fears
- Released: 15 December 2009
- Recorded: 1990 (erroneously stated as 1989 on case)
- Genres: New wave; pop rock; synthpop
- Length: 68:11
- Label: Immortal
- Producer: Raoul (Roland Orzabal)

Tears for Fears chronology
Secret World Live in Paris (2006)	Live from Santa Barbara (2009)

Going to California is a concert performance video by the English band Tears for Fears. Released in 1990, it is a recording of the band's show at the Santa Barbara County Bowl in May 1990 during their "Seeds of Love" World Tour.

The performance also features American vocalist/pianist Oleta Adams who had worked with the band on their album The Seeds of Love and joined them for the subsequent world tour.

Going to California was initially released on VHS home video and Laserdisc, and was later released on DVD in 2005 as an "extra feature" on the band's Scenes from the Big Chair documentary DVD, complete with an updated 5.1 soundtrack audio option. Footage from the concert would be incorporated into the promotional video for the single "Famous Last Words", which was released in summer 1990 without the band's involvement.

The concert video was re-released (by itself) on DVD in 2009 as Tears for Fears – Live from Santa Barbara, which featured twelve of the tracks (the original 1990 release had sixteen). An audio CD version was also released simultaneously under the same title.

== Track listing ==
=== VHS/Laserdisc/DVD version ===
- "Women of Ireland" (instrumental)
- "I Believe" (performed by Oleta Adams)
- "Head Over Heels" / "Broken"
- "Change"
- "Pale Shelter"
- "Woman in Chains"
- "Advice for the Young at Heart"
- "Mad World"
- "Famous Last Words" / "When the Saints Go Marching In"
- "I've Got to Sing My Song" (performed by Oleta Adams)
- "Badman's Song"
- "Sowing the Seeds of Love"
- "All You Need Is Love"
- "Everybody Wants to Rule the World"
- "Year of the Knife"
- "Shout"

=== 2009 "Live from Santa Barbara" (DVD and CD) ===
- "I Believe" (performed by Oleta Adams)
- "Head Over Heels" (along with "Broken", which is unlisted)
- "Woman in Chains"
- "Year of the Knife"
- "Advice for the Young at Heart"
- "Sowing the Seeds of Love"
- "Badman's Song"
- "Famous Last Words"
- "When the Saints Go Marching In"
- "I've Got to Sing My Song" (performed by Oleta Adams)
- "Shout"
- "Everybody Wants to Rule the World"

The 2009 DVD and CD release uses the tracks from the same performance as the VHS/DVD version but only uses twelve and in a slightly different order. This release ends with "Everybody Wants to Rule the World" instead of "Shout" which has always been used as the closing song at all Tears for Fears concerts since 1985.

== Band personnel ==
- Roland Orzabal (guitar, vocals)
- Curt Smith (bass, vocals)
- Oleta Adams (piano, vocals)
- Carol Steele (percussion, backing vocals)
- Neil Taylor (lead guitar)
- Andy Davis (keyboards)
- Will Gregory (saxophone)
- Jim Copley (drums)
- Adele Bertei (backing vocals)
- Biti Strauchn (backing vocals)

Music produced by Roland Orzabal (credited as "Raoul").
