= Tears Roll Down (Greatest Hits 82–92) =

1992 greatest hits album by Tears for Fears

Greatest hits album by Tears for Fears
- Released: 2 March 1992
- Recorded: 1982–1992
- Genres: New wave; pop rock; synth-pop
- Length: 59:15
- Labels: Fontana; Mercury; PolyGram
- Producers: David Bascombe; Ross Cullum; Chris Hughes; Tim Palmer; Tears for Fears

Tears for Fears chronology
The Seeds of Love (1989)	Tears Roll Down (Greatest Hits 82–92) (1992)	Elemental (1993)

Singles from Tears Roll Down
- 1. "Laid So Low (Tears Roll Down)" Released: 10 February 1992; 2. "Woman in Chains" Released: 13 April 1992

Tears Roll Down (Greatest Hits 82–92)

Video by Tears for Fears
- Released: 1992
- Recorded: 1982–1992
- Length: 60 minutes
- Label: PolyGram Video
- Directors: Jim Blashfield; Andy Morahan; Clive Richardson; Nigel Dick; Steve Barron; Paul Donnellon

Tears for Fears chronology
Going to California (1990)	Tears Roll Down (Greatest Hits 82–92) (1992)

Professional ratings
Review scores
Source	Rating
AllMusic	4/5 stars
Entertainment Weekly	C+

Tears Roll Down (Greatest Hits 82–92) is a greatest hits album by the English pop rock band Tears for Fears. It was released on 2 March 1992 by Fontana Records. Preceded by the new single "Laid So Low (Tears Roll Down)", the album contains the band's UK and international top-20 singles, excluding "Everybody Wants to Run the World" - a reworked version of "Everybody Wants to Rule the World" recorded for Sport Aid. It has been certified double platinum in the United Kingdom, platinum in the United States, and gold in several other countries including Canada, France and Germany.

Tears Roll Down originally peaked at number one in Italy, number two in the UK and France and reached the top 10 in several other countries upon its release, but re-entered the UK top 10 at number six in 2004 for several weeks following the success of Gary Jules' cover version of "Mad World".

A compilation video under the same title was also released simultaneously in 1992, and later issued on DVD. The album itself was reissued in 2004 as a 2-CD/1-DVD set under the "Sound+Vision Deluxe" line, and again in 2005 with a bonus disc containing several remixes. The compilation was eventually supplanted by another greatest hits package, Rule the World: The Greatest Hits, in 2017, and is now out of print.

== Track listing ==
No.	Title	Writer(s)	Original album	Length
1.	"Sowing the Seeds of Love"	Roland Orzabal; Curt Smith	The Seeds of Love, 1989	6:19
2.	"Everybody Wants to Rule the World"	Orzabal; Ian Stanley; Chris Hughes	Songs from the Big Chair, 1985	4:12
3.	"Woman in Chains" (with Oleta Adams)	Orzabal	The Seeds of Love	6:28
4.	"Shout"	Orzabal; Stanley	Songs from the Big Chair	6:33
5.	"Head over Heels" (7" version)	Orzabal; Smith	Songs from the Big Chair	4:14
6.	"Mad World"	Orzabal	The Hurting, 1983	3:29
7.	"Pale Shelter"	Orzabal	The Hurting	4:39
8.	"I Believe"	Orzabal	Songs from the Big Chair	4:50
9.	"Laid So Low (Tears Roll Down)"	Orzabal; Dave Bascombe	Previously unreleased	4:44
10.	"Mothers Talk"	Orzabal; Stanley	Songs from the Big Chair	4:59
11.	"Change" (7" version)	Orzabal	The Hurting	3:54
12.	"Advice for the Young at Heart"	Orzabal; Nicky Holland	The Seeds of Love	4:54
Total length:				59:15

=== 1992 Tears Laid Low (Canada only promo companion disc) ===
1. "Tears Roll Down" – 3:20
2. "Johnny Panic & the Bible of Dreams" (Mix Two) – 5:59
3. "Always in the Past" – 4:37
4. "We Are Broken" – 4:06
5. "The Conflict" – 4:05
6. "My Life in the Suicide Ranks" – 4:33
7. "Music for Tables" – 3:33
8. "Empire Building" – 2:54
9. "The Marauders" – 4:17
10. "The Big Chair" – 3:19
11. "When in Love with a Blind Man" – 2:25
12. "Sea Song" – 3:51
13. "Pharoahs" [sic] – 3:42

Notes

similar compilation to Saturnine Martial & Lunatic
Pharoahs is spelled that way on both the insert and CD

=== 2004 bonus disc ===
No.	Title	Writer(s)	Original album	Length
1.	"Memories Fade"	Orzabal	The Hurting	5:08
2.	"Start of the Breakdown"	Orzabal	The Hurting	4:16
3.	"The Hurting"	Orzabal	The Hurting	4:16
4.	"The Marauders"	Orzabal; Smith; Stanley	B-side of "The Way You Are", 1983	4:10
5.	"The Working Hour"	Orzabal; Stanley; Manny Elias	Songs from the Big Chair	6:33
6.	"Shout" (US remix)	Orzabal; Stanley	Songs from the Big Chair	8:02
7.	"Standing on the Corner of the Third World"	Orzabal	The Seeds of Love	5:30
8.	"Johnny Panic & the Bible of Dreams"	Orzabal	B-side of "Advice for the Young at Heart", 1990	4:19
9.	"Break It Down Again"	Orzabal; Alan Griffiths	Elemental, 1993	4:32
10.	"Elemental"	Orzabal; Griffiths	Elemental	5:31
11.	"Bloodletting Go"	Orzabal; Griffiths	B-side of "Break It Down Again", 1993	4:13
12.	"The Body Wah"	Orzabal; Griffiths	B-side of "Laid So Low", 1992	5:17

=== 2005 bonus remix disc ===
1. "Shout" (Skylark 12" Extended Club Mix) – 9:07
2. "Change" (Joey Negro Punkdisco Mix) – 7:42
3. "Head Over Heels" (Dave Bascombe 7" N. Mix) – 4:17
4. "Pale Shelter" (New Extended Version) – 7:09
5. "Laid So Low (Tears Roll Down)" (US Dance Mix) – 3:18
6. "Mothers Talk" (Beat of the Drum Mix) – 8:57
7. "Sowing the Seeds of Love" (Wen's Overnight Mix) – 6:48
8. "Shout" (Jakatta Thrilled-Out Mix) – 5:36
9. "Woman in Chains" (Jakatta Awakened Mix Radio Edit) – 3:45
10. "Mad World" (Afterlife Remix) – 5:18
11. "Everybody Wants to Rule the World" (The Chosen Few Remix) – 6:34

Notes

Track 3 is the "remix" from the original 7" (1985).
Track 4 is the "extended version" from the re-released 12" (1983).
Track 5 is the original "Sowing the Seeds of Love" (1989) B-side "Tears Roll Down"; the same version can be found on the Saturnine Martial & Lunatic compilation.
Track 7 is similar to the "full version" from the 12" and CD single (1989), but has an additional echo on "Feel the pain".

=== 2020 SACD ===
1. "Sowing the Seeds of Love" – 6:19
2. "Everybody Wants to Rule the World" – 4:10
3. "Woman in Chains" – 6:28
4. "Shout" – 6:33
5. "Head over Heels" – 4:14
6. "Mad World" – 3:29
7. "Pale Shelter" – 4:39
8. "I Believe" – 4:49
9. "Laid So Low (Tears Roll Down)" – 4:44
10. "Mothers Talk" – 4:59
11. "Change" – 3:54
12. "Advice for the Young at Heart" – 4:54
13. "Shout" (Skylark 12" Extended Club Mix) – 9:07
14. "Everybody Wants to Rule the World" (The Chosen Few Remix) – 6:34

== Charts ==
=== Weekly charts ===
1992 weekly chart performance for Tears Roll Down (Greatest Hits 82–92)
Chart (1992)	Peak position
Australian Albums (ARIA)	101
Austrian Albums (Ö3 Austria)	34
Belgian Albums (IFPI)	2
Canada Top Albums/CDs (RPM)	19
Dutch Albums (Album Top 100)	22
European Albums (Music & Media)	6
French Compilation Albums (SNEP)	2
German Albums (Offizielle Top 100)	7
Irish Albums (IFPI)	3
Italian Albums (Musica e dischi)	2
Japanese Albums (Oricon)	48
New Zealand Albums (RMNZ)	9
Spanish Albums (AFYVE)	10
Swedish Albums (Sverigetopplistan)	41
Swiss Albums (Schweizer Hitparade)	14
UK Albums (Official Charts)	2
US Billboard 200	53

1995 weekly chart performance for Tears Roll Down (Greatest Hits 82–92)
Chart (1995)	Peak position
Belgian Albums (Ultratop Wallonia)	47

=== Year-end charts ===
1992 year-end chart performance for Tears Roll Down (Greatest Hits 82–92)
Chart (1992)	Position
Canada Top Albums/CDs (RPM)	98
Dutch Albums (Album Top 100)	94
European Albums (Music & Media)	30
German Albums (Offizielle Top 100)	55
UK Albums (OCC)	25

2004 year-end chart performance for Tears Roll Down (Greatest Hits 82–92)
Chart (2004)	Position
UK Albums (OCC)	100

== Certifications ==
Certifications for Tears Roll Down (Greatest Hits 82–92)
Region	Certification	Certified units/sales
Canada (Music Canada)	Gold	50,000^{^}
France (SNEP)	Gold	100,000^{*}
Germany (BVMI)	Gold	250,000^{^}
New Zealand (RMNZ)	Platinum	15,000^{^}
Spain (Promusicae)	Gold	50,000^{^}
Switzerland (IFPI Switzerland)	Gold	25,000^{^}
United Kingdom (BPI)	2× Platinum	600,000^{^}
United States (RIAA)	Platinum	1,000,000^{^}
^{*} Sales figures based on certification alone.^{^} Shipments figures based on certification alone.

== Video compilation ==
The video compilation of Tears Roll Down (Greatest Hits 82–92) was released in 1992 in conjunction with the album, featuring an identical track list. It was reissued on DVD in 2003 with a different cover featuring a still from the "Sowing the Seeds of Love" promo video under Universal Music's "Classic Clips" imprint. After the Tears Roll Down album made a return to the UK top 10 in 2004, the DVD was reissued with the original white "sunflower" cover. The DVD release includes a 5.1 surround sound audio option as well as 2.0 stereo.

=== Track listing ===
1. "Sowing the Seeds of Love" – 6:19
2. "Everybody Wants to Rule the World" – 4:11
3. "Woman in Chains" – 6:28
4. "Shout" – 6:33
5. "Head over Heels" – 4:14
6. "Mad World" – 3:29
7. "Pale Shelter" – 4:39
8. "I Believe" – 4:50
9. "Laid So Low (Tears Roll Down)" – 4:44
10. "Mothers Talk" – 4:59
11. "Change" – 3:54
12. "Advice for the Young at Heart" – 4:54
