= Cold (Tears for Fears song) =

1993 single by Tears for Fears

Single by Tears for Fears

from the album Elemental
- B-side: "New Star"; "Deja-Vu & the Sins of Science"
- Released: 19 July 1993
- Length: 5:04
- Label: Mercury
- Songwriter: Roland Orzabal
- Producers: Roland Orzabal; Tim Palmer; Alan Griffiths

Tears for Fears singles chronology
"Break It Down Again" (1993)	"Cold" (1993)	"Goodnight Song" (1993)

Music video
- "Cold" on YouTube

"Cold" is a song by the English pop rock band Tears for Fears. Released in July 1993, it served as the second single from the band's Elemental. The single peaked at number 72 on the UK Singles Chart and reached the Top 30 in Iceland.

== Lyrical content ==
According to the Elemental EPK, the song is an account of an encounter with a German photographer who was trying to take pictures of Roland Orzabal while he was on-stage. He wasn't in the mood for photos and kept turning his face away and giving her the 'cold' shoulder. He eventually received a note from her later that said 'how can someone who makes such warm music to be so cold'. The first 2 verses of the song describe this event.

The song's lyrics, written by Orzabal, also contain references to prior associates of Tears for Fears such as the line "Listened to my old friend Nockles, hoped that it would warm the cockles" which is a reference to former Tears for Fears keyboardist and one time co-writer Nicky Holland whose nickname was "Nockles".

Orzabal also takes a swipe at former Tears for Fears business manager Paul King with the lyric "King got caught with his fingers in the till. Where's your calculator, will you leave it in your will?" after alleged discrepancies were discovered in King's prior management of the band's financial affairs. King declared bankruptcy in 1990 and, after being found guilty of later fraudulent activities, was imprisoned in 2004 and disqualified from being a company director for a period of 10 years.

== Releases ==
The 7-inch and CD single included the B-side "New Star". This song can be heard on Gloryland World Cup USA 94, the official album of the 1994 FIFA World Cup. It can also be heard during the opening credits of the 1994 film Threesome and appears on the film's soundtrack album. It was also later included on the 1996 compilation album Saturnine Martial & Lunatic and the 2001 greatest hits album Shout: The Very Best of Tears for Fears.

== Music video ==
The music video was filmed over five days at the Kew Bridge Steam Museum in Brentford, England, and at Pinewood Studios in London. It employs the use of stop motion photography and features Orzabal inside a block of ice (actually clear fibreglass) as people are trying to chisel him out.

== Track listings ==
UK 7-inch: IDEA19

1. "Cold" – 5:06
2. "New Star" (Roland Orzabal, Alan Griffiths)

UK CD single: IDECD19

1. "Cold"
2. "New Star" (Orzabal, Griffiths)
3. "Deja-Vu & the Sins of Science" (Orzabal, Griffiths)

== Charts ==
=== Weekly charts ===
Chart (1993)	Peak position
Iceland (Íslenski Listinn Topp 40)	22
UK Singles (Official Charts)	72
