= Saturnine Martial & Lunatic =

Compilation album by Tears for Fears
- Released: 3 June 1996 (UK)
- Recorded: 1983–1993
- Genre: Pop rock
- Length: 78:32
- Labels: Mercury; Fontana
- Producer: Various

Tears for Fears chronology
Raoul and the Kings of Spain (1995)	Saturnine Martial & Lunatic (1996)	20th Century Masters – The Millennium Collection: The Best of Tears for Fears (2000)

Professional ratings
Review scores
Source	Rating
AllMusic	3/5 stars

Saturnine Martial & Lunatic is a compilation album by the English pop rock band Tears for Fears, released on 3 June 1996.

It is a collection of B-sides, non-album and rare tracks, spanning some ten years of recording from the band's era signed to Mercury/Phonogram and thus does not feature any b-sides from Raoul and the Kings of Spain despite being released the previous year as the band's label switch to Sony in 1994.

The album includes liner notes written by the band members themselves, reflecting on the tracks included.

== Track listing ==
No.	Title	Writer(s)	Original release	Length
1.	"Johnny Panic and the Bible of Dreams" (Fluke remix)"	Roland Orzabal	1991 single	6:21
2.	"The Big Chair"	Roland Orzabal, Curt Smith, Ian Stanley, Chris Hughes	B-side of "Shout"	3:20
3.	"Schrödinger's Cat"	Roland Orzabal, Alan Griffiths	B-side of "Break It Down Again"	5:03
4.	"My Life in the Suicide Ranks"	Roland Orzabal, Ian Stanley, Chris Hughes	B-side of "Woman in Chains"	4:32
5.	"When in Love With a Blind Man"	Roland Orzabal, Ian Stanley	B-side of "Head Over Heels"	2:24
6.	"Pharaohs (Single Version)"	Roland Orzabal, Curt Smith, Ian Stanley, Chris Hughes	B-side of "Everybody Wants to Rule the World"	3:41
7.	"Déjà-Vu and the Sins of Science"	Roland Orzabal, Alan Griffiths	B-side of "Cold"	6:24
8.	"The Marauders"	Roland Orzabal, Ian Stanley	"The Way You Are"	4:08
9.	"Tears Roll Down"	Roland Orzabal, David Bascombe	B-side of "Sowing the Seeds of Love"	3:16
10.	"New Star"	Roland Orzabal, Alan Griffiths	B-side of "Cold"	4:26
11.	"The Body Wah"	Roland Orzabal, Alan Griffiths	"Laid So Low (Tears Roll Down)" 12" single	5:19
12.	"Lord of Karma"	Roland Orzabal, Alan Griffiths	"Laid So Low (Tears Roll Down)" 12" single	4:41
13.	"Bloodletting Go"	Roland Orzabal, Alan Griffiths	B-side of "Break It Down Again"	4:11
14.	"Always in the Past"	Roland Orzabal, Ian Stanley	B-side of "Woman in Chains"	4:38
15.	"Sea Song"	Robert Wyatt	B-side of "I Believe (A Soulful Re-Recording)"	3:51
16.	"Ashes to Ashes"	David Bowie	Ruby Trax	4:31
17.	"Empire Building"	Roland Orzabal, Curt Smith, Ian Stanley	B-side of "Mothers Talk"	2:49
18.	"The Way You Are"	Roland Orzabal, Curt Smith, Ian Stanley, Manny Elias	1983 single	4:57

== Notes ==
- The included version of "Johnny Panic" is not the original 1990, B-side version, but the remix produced by Fluke, which was released in 1991 as a single in its own right. The original can be heard on the B-side of "Advice for the Young at Heart" and also on the remastered CD of The Seeds of Love.
- The included version of "Tears Roll Down" is the original B-side from 1989, not the later "Laid So Low (Tears Roll Down)" version which was a hit single in 1992.
- Other notable absent tracks are "Wino", "The Conflict" and "Music for Tables". All of these have later been included on reissues of the original albums.

== Charts ==
Chart performance for Saturnine Martial & Lunatic
Chart (2023)	Peak position
UK Physical Albums (OCC)	42
UK Vinyl Albums (OCC)	32
