= Elemental (Tears for Fears album) =

Studio album by Tears for Fears
- Released: 7 June 1993
- Studio: Neptune's Kitchen (England)
- Genres: New wave; pop rock; alternative rock; progressive pop
- Length: 46:51
- Label: Phonogram/Mercury
- Producers: Roland Orzabal; Tim Palmer; Alan Griffiths

Tears for Fears chronology
Tears Roll Down (Greatest Hits 82–92) (1992)	Elemental (1993)	Raoul and the Kings of Spain (1995)

Singles from Elemental
- 1. "Break It Down Again" Released: 17 May 1993; 2. "Cold" Released: 19 July 1993; 3. "Goodnight Song" Released: October 1993; 4. "Elemental" Released: March 1994

Elemental is the fourth studio album by the English pop rock band Tears for Fears, released on 7 June 1993 by Phonogram/Mercury Records. It was the band's first album recorded following the departure of co-founder Curt Smith, with Roland Orzabal assuming sole leadership with the help of additional musicians, essentially making it an Orzabal solo album to many people.

The album peaked at No. 5 in the UK and No. 45 in the US; it also reached the top 10 in France and Italy, the top 20 in Canada and the top 30 in several European countries. It has been certified Silver in the UK, and Gold in the US, Canada and France. The single "Break It Down Again" was a hit across Europe and North America, and was the band's last single to reach the US top 40.

Elemental was the last album that Tears for Fears released under the Phonogram/Mercury label, the company to which the band had been signed since 1981.

== Production ==
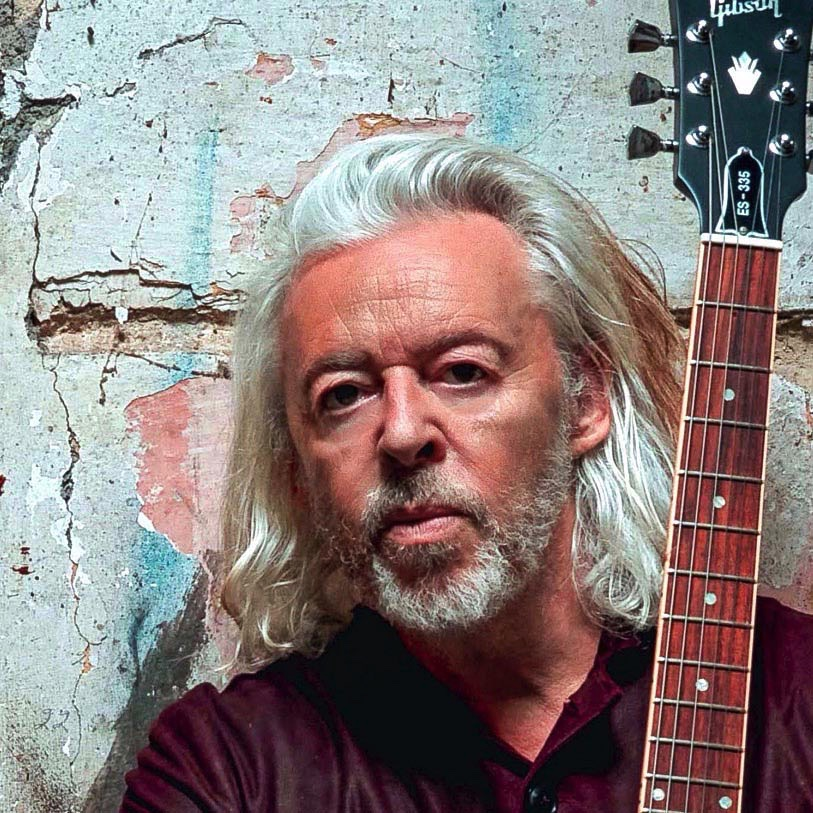
Roland Orzabal took the reins of the band following the 1991 departure of Curt Smith.

Elemental was the first new Tears for Fears album in four years, following 1989's The Seeds of Love. However, despite being released under the Tears for Fears moniker, it is essentially a solo effort by Roland Orzabal, as Curt Smith had left the band in 1991. Regarding the split with Smith, Orzabal stated in 1993,

Well, the fact is that I'd always been the songwriter, and Curt relied on me for songs, and those songs were getting less and less as the years progressed... And then during The Seeds of Love, I kind of took over as the producer as well, so it was becoming like a one-man band. And then in the end it became one in reality. We had a lot of shared assets—well, actually a lot of liabilities—after that last tour. And I took over the running of the company. This is just another phase Tears for Fears is going through."

Orzabal publicly downplayed Tears for Fears' loss of Curt Smith, stating, "The relationship I had with Curt was like that of a producer to an artist... I'd help him get his vocals right and even write his songs for him. It wasn't really a shared thing." Smith released his first solo album, Soul on Board, on 23 August 1993, shortly after the release of Elemental, but the album was not a success.

For much of the writing and recording of Elemental, Orzabal was assisted by musician Alan Griffiths (1959–2017), a longtime acquaintance who had collaborated with Tears for Fears before. In 1978, Griffiths became a founding member of the Bristol band Apartment, which became the new wave music band The Escape in 1981. In early 1983, The Escape signed with Phonogram Records, making the band label-mates with Tears for Fears. In late 1983, The Escape was Tears for Fears' support act, but the band broke up in late 1984 and Griffiths and Escape bandmate Nicky Holland became backing musicians for Tears for Fears' 1985 world tour. Holland then continued working with Tears for Fears, becoming an essential figure on The Seeds of Love album, playing keyboards and co-writing the majority of that album's songs with Orzabal, and her former bandmate Griffiths took on a similar role with Tears for Fears in the 1990s after the departure of Curt Smith. Orzabal later recalled, "When I split up with Curt, I wrote with Alan Griffiths and we were extremely prolific. We'd come up with a song virtually every day. Al was a bit of a genius, able to make musical sketches that were easy to jump off and finish into a song. That was an amazing period, and it's tougher to write with people you don't know yet."

Elemental was recorded at Orzabal's newly built home studio, Neptune's Kitchen, and was co-produced by Orzabal, Griffiths and Tim Palmer. Palmer's recent credits at the time included co-producing David Bowie's first Tin Machine album (1989's Tin Machine) and mixing Pearl Jam's debut album Ten (1991). Orzabal stated, "I'm kind of used to working autonomously... I would say that this album is less of a solo album than Seeds of Love, in fact. The team I worked with was amazing—Tim Palmer the co-producer, and Alan Griffiths, who co-wrote the stuff." Parts of the album have a more alternative rock sound than on previous Tears for Fears albums; this sound would be explored further in the next Tears for Fears album, Raoul and the Kings of Spain (1995), which Orzabal also recorded with Griffiths and Palmer. Griffiths would also collaborate with Orzabal on the latter's first and only official solo album, Tomcats Screaming Outside (2001).

Interviewed twenty years after the release of Elemental, Palmer recalled, "In the 80's, [Tears for Fears] had a reputation for spending a lot of time making records, but that's just the way they are. I tried to speed things up and got the record done in six months—not much of an achievement, but it was fast for them." Orzabal had a recording studio built at his home to record the album, stating, "It's an old photographer's studio that we converted. It was called Neptune's Kitchen, and we used a lot of copper that was doused in acid to look like it's been underwater and all the colors are sort of greens and blues like the sea. And there's a weathervane on top of the building which is a whale... It was necessary, economically, to work at home because I spend so long in the studios on albums that the bills mount up, and doing it at home was a sensible move."

Tim Palmer recalled,

It was a very important album for [Orzabal] because it was the first one he made without Curt Smith... There was a lot of pressure on him. Actually, this was an important record for me, as well, because Roland was one of the first artists who responded to my input musically. I'd come to the studio in the morning and throw a couple of ideas up, hoping he might like them, and he'd come in and say, 'That's really great. We should work on that.'... I played a lot of drums on the record, too. There was some editing involved, because I can’t claim to be the greatest drummer in the world. But I'm on there, and I played some guitars, as well. It was a great opportunity for me to add something musically to what I was producing."

Palmer enjoyed a good working relationship with Orzabal during the recording sessions for Elemental, recalling, "Roland is very into star signs. Before we started working on the record, he mapped out a composite star chart of us both, and he read it and said that he thought we would get along very well together, which we did."

== Songs ==
Curt Smith's departure from Tears for Fears influenced Roland Orzabal's songwriting for the new album; Orzabal stated that "a lot of the songs were written while I was in a sense going through the 'divorce'... Things like "Break It Down Again" refer to that to some degree, and "Fish Out of Water", obviously. I did psychotherapy for about six years. I stopped going regularly when I'd finished [the song] "Elemental", which I think probably says something. I think I'm moving on."

The first single from Elemental, "Break It Down Again", was a relatively successful release, making both the UK top 20 and US top 30 singles charts. When Smith (who rejoined Tears for Fears in 2000) was asked in 2022 what his favorite "Curt Smith-less Tears for Fears songs" are, Smith answered, "I have come to really like 'Break It Down Again'. We play that song nowadays and I enjoy playing it."

"Cold" was the second single from Elemental to be released in the UK, but was not released in the US. According to Orzabal in the Elemental EPK, the song was inspired by an encounter with a German photographer who was trying to take pictures of him while he was on-stage. The photographer tried to get Orzabal's attention but he was not in the mood for photos and kept turning his face away. He eventually received a note from the photographer asking 'how can someone who makes such warm music to be so cold'. The first 2 verses of the song describe this event. The song's lyrics, written by Orzabal, contain also references to prior associates of Tears for Fears such as the line "Listened to my old friend Nockles, hoped that it would warm the cockles". "Nockles" is the nickname of former Tears for Fears keyboardist Nicky Holland, Orzabal's songwriting partner for much of the band's previous album, The Seeds of Love. Orzabal also takes a swipe at former Tears for Fears business manager Paul King with the lyric "King got caught with his fingers in the till. Where's your calculator, will you leave it in your will?" after alleged discrepancies were discovered in King's prior management of the band's financial affairs. King declared bankruptcy in 1990 and, after being found guilty of later fraudulent activities, was imprisoned in 2004 and disqualified from being a company director for a period of ten years. According to Orzabal, "After the breakup [with Smith], things were a complete mess on the business end as well... So I was on my own, without a manager, without anybody that was familiar. And I needed to go through that. You can hear it on a song like 'Cold', where I say 'Look, I need distance, I need to be on my own, I don't want a relationship.'"

The closing track of Elemental, "Goodnight Song", was released as the album's second single in the US (in lieu of "Cold"). It was also released as a single in some parts of Europe, although not in the UK. The "Cold" and "Goodnight Song" singles both featured the song "New Star" as a B-side; this song can be heard on Gloryland World Cup USA 94, the official album of the 1994 FIFA World Cup. It can also be heard during the opening credits of the 1994 film Threesome and appears on the film's soundtrack album, and was later included in the Tears for Fears compilation albums Saturnine Martial & Lunatic (1996) and Shout: The Very Best of Tears for Fears (2001).

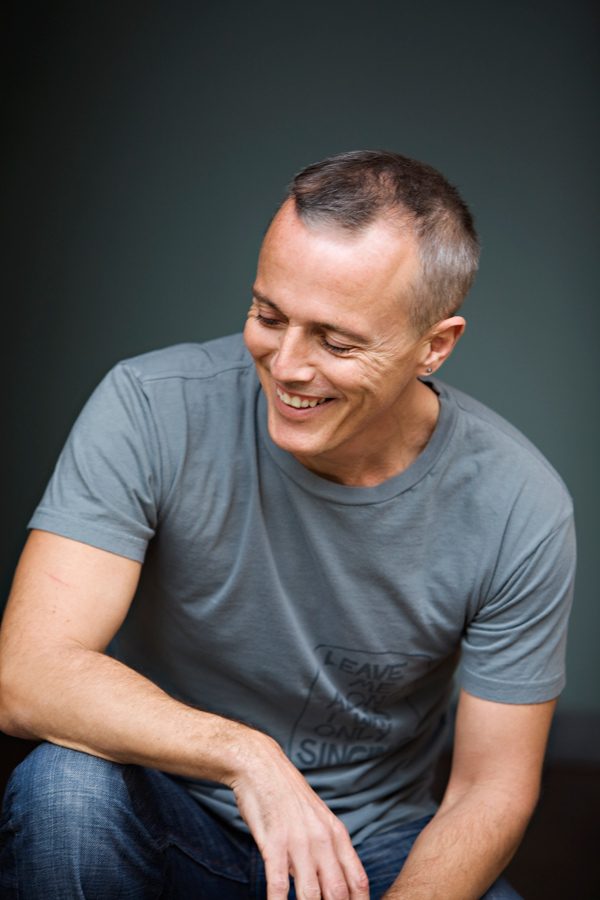
Curt Smith retrospectively expressed amusement at "Fish Out of Water", a diss track directed towards him.

The title track of Elemental was released in early 1994 as the album's third US single; the maxi CD version contains live tracks recorded from a Tears for Fears concert at Wembley Stadium on 14 December 1993.

Smith is also the subject of "Fish Out of Water", a song Orzabal referred to as his "How Do You Sleep?" (John Lennon's scathing 1971 song about his former Beatles bandmate and songwriting partner, Paul McCartney.) Of his relationship with Smith at the time, Orzabal stated, "I think it's similar to the animosity between a parent and a child; the parent wants the child to grow up and the child doesn't want to grow up. You know, for fuck’s sake, get out of the nest!" The opening lyrics of "Fish Out of Water" are a salvo against Smith ("You always said you were the compassionate one/But now you're laughing at the sun/With all your high class friends you think you've got it made/The only thing you made was that tanned look on your face/With all your cigarettes and fancy cars/You ain't a clue who or what you are/You're dreaming your life away..."). The song also makes references to "Neptune's Kitchen" (the studio in which Elemental was recorded), Arthur Janov's book The Primal Scream (a major influence on Orzabal and Smith's lives and the first Tears for Fears album The Hurting), and the 1983 Tears for Fears song "Memories Fade". Smith later responded to "Fish Out of Water" with the song "Sun King" in his album Mayfield (1998). In 2022, Smith said, "I get a real kick out of 'Fish Out of Water', which is about me in a very derogatory way. I found it highly amusing."

The song "Dog's a Best Friend's Dog" contains a reference to Samuel Beckett's play Waiting for Godot ("Tell Mr. Godot I'm walking the dog") and the album's penultimate track, "Brian Wilson Said", is in part a Beach Boys pastiche. The title is a backhanded reference to the Van Morrison song "Jackie Wilson Said (I'm in Heaven When You Smile)", which Morrison wrote about one of his idols, Jackie Wilson. Similarly, Orzabal wanted to write a song about one of his idols, Brian Wilson of the Beach Boys.

== Tour ==
Tears for Fears supported Elemental with a live tour of North America that took place between August and November 1993, followed by one concert in Paris and four in the UK in December 1993. The band assembled for the tour comprised Roland Orzabal on vocals and lead guitar, Alan Griffiths on keyboards and guitar, Gail Ann Dorsey on bass, Brian MacLeod on drums, Jeffrey Trott on guitars, and Jebin Bruni on keyboards. Orzabal retained this band for the recording sessions of the next Tears for Fears album, Raoul and the Kings of Spain (1995). The 1993 set lists, on occasion, featured covers (a live recording of Radiohead's "Creep" was released as a B-side in 1996, and the song remained a staple of the band's live shows until 2019) as well as new songs, some of which would appear on Raoul and the Kings of Spain and its B-sides, while "Size of Sorrow" wasn't released until 2004 with Curt Smith now singing the song (Gail Ann Dorsey had sung it in concert).

Regarding the Elemental tour, Orzabal stated at the time,

The show is a little more focused and a lot more gutsy than previously... The light show is fantastic. We mainly perform the new album, obviously, because it sounds great and it translates very well live. But we segue quite often into older songs, and that surprise element seems to be working very well, the audience really appreciates it... It's a lot easier [without Curt Smith], to be honest. I think I was very lazy in a duo. It was so much more exciting and inspiring when we had Oleta Adams with us on that last tour... I thought, at this point in my career, I had to bring everything back to its basic elements. For me to be at center stage just makes so much sense right now. And I have a lot of fun. I can take responsibility for what I'm doing."

== Critical reception ==
Professional ratings
Review scores
Source	Rating
AllMusic	3.5/5 stars
Calgary Herald	A
The Encyclopedia of Popular Music	2/5 stars
MusicHound Rock: The Essential Album Guide	3/5 stars
Music Week	3/5 stars
Philadelphia Inquirer	2.5/4 stars
Rolling Stone	4/5 stars

The New York Times wrote that "the album finds Mr. Orzabal straining self-consciously to make grand statements that lack the concision and spontaneity of Tears for Fears' best early work. It also has an undertone of meanness." Entertainment Weekly wrote that "the sampled guitar bursts and nifty studio tricks, like Squeeze mimicking the Beatles, keep you obediently humming while Orzabal plays teen-neuroses word games." Trouser Press thought that the album "essentially upholds Orzabal’s dedication to create remarkable textures and settings for essentially ordinary pop songs sprung from his bristly, remote and self-critical personality."

Upon its release in 1993, Elemental received a positive review in Rolling Stone magazine. Rating the album four stars out of five, the review states,

Even with one Tear for Fear subtracted from the mix – Curt Smith is gone, but Roland Orzabal remains – the lush sound of Tears for Fears continues to improve... Since Smith quit after the 1991 Seeds of Love world tour, Orzabal is left to fend off existential angst on his own – which he does with amazing grace and integrity on Elemental. Orzabal, guitarist Alan Griffiths and co-producer Tim Palmer (Pearl Jam, Tin Machine) provide the production techniques, smooth segues and sweeping guitar-keyboard interplay that fans have come to expect from Tears for Fears. Tracks like "Cold," "Power" and "Break It Down Again" are replete with melodic free falls, harmonized and overlapped vocals, burbling keyboards and guitar shudders... Elemental flashes the same sort of sheen, wordplay and sound wash that flourished in the '80s and still fights for its place on modern rock charts.

== Track listing ==
All songs written by Roland Orzabal and Alan Griffiths, except "Cold", written by Orzabal.

1. "Elemental" – 5:30
2. "Cold" – 5:05
3. "Break It Down Again" – 4:31
4. "Mr. Pessimist" – 6:16
5. "Dog's a Best Friend's Dog" – 3:39
6. "Fish out of Water" – 5:07
7. "Gas Giants" – 2:40
8. "Power" – 5:49
9. "Brian Wilson Said" – 4:22
10. "Goodnight Song" – 3:53

Notes

- To date, Elemental has never been re-released with bonus tracks, although a half-dozen songs released as B-sides during the Elemental era were included in the Tears for Fears compilation album Saturnine Martial & Lunatic (1996).
- Elemental was the last Tears for Fears studio album released by Mercury Records although it was not the last album recorded by the band for Mercury. Raoul and the Kings of Spain, recorded between 1994 and 1995, was originally scheduled to be released by Mercury, and promo editions of the album were circulated under the Mercury imprint. However, Raoul and the Kings of Spain was eventually released in October 1995 by Sony's Epic Records after Tears for Fears signed with that label.

== Personnel ==
Tears for Fears

- Roland Orzabal – vocals, instruments

Additional musicians

- Alan Griffiths – instruments
- Tim Palmer – instruments
- Mark O'Donoughue – Wurlitzer electric piano outro (track 10)
- Guy Pratt – additional bass guitar (track 4)
- John Baker – backing vocals (track 2), additional backing vocals (track 3)
- Julian Orzabal – backing vocals (track 2)

Technical

- Roland Orzabal – producer
- Alan Griffiths – producer
- Tim Palmer – producer
- Mark O'Donoughue – engineer
- Julian Lavender – technician
- Bob Ludwig – mastering at Gateway Mastering (Portland, Maine, USA)

Visual

- Area – design
- David Austen – collages
- Pamela Springsteen – photography

== Charts ==
=== Weekly charts ===
Weekly chart performance for Elemental
Chart (1993)	Peak position
Australian Albums (ARIA)	56
Canada Top Albums/CDs (RPM)	18
Dutch Albums (Album Top 100)	31
European Albums (Music & Media)	14
French Albums (IFOP)	5
German Albums (Offizielle Top 100)	26
Spanish Albums (AFYVE)	31
Swedish Albums (Sverigetopplistan)	26
Swiss Albums (Schweizer Hitparade)	24
UK Albums (Official Charts)	5
US Billboard 200	45

=== Year-end charts ===
Year-end chart performance for Elemental
Chart (1993)	Position
European Albums (Music & Media)	71

== Certifications ==
Certifications for Elemental
Region	Certification	Certified units/sales
Canada (Music Canada)	Gold	50,000^{^}
France (SNEP)	Gold	100,000^{*}
United Kingdom (BPI)	Silver	60,000^{^}
United States (RIAA)	Gold	500,000^{^}
^{*} Sales figures based on certification alone.^{^} Shipments figures based on certification alone.
