= Goodnight Song =

Single by Tears for Fears

from the album Elemental
- B-side: "New Star"; "Elemental" (Sons of August mix)
- Released: October 1993
- Genre: Rock
- Length: 3:53
- Label: Mercury
- Songwriters: Roland Orzabal; Alan Griffiths
- Producers: Alan Griffiths; Tim Palmer; Roland Orzabal

Tears for Fears singles chronology
"Cold" (1993)	"Goodnight Song" (1993)	"Elemental" (1994)

Music video
- "Goodnight Song" on YouTube

"Goodnight Song" is a song by the English pop rock band Tears for Fears from their 1993 album Elemental. It was released as a single in North America and in some European countries (though not in the UK), and was a minor hit in Canada.

The US single included the B-side "New Star". This song was played during the opening credits of the 1994 film Threesome and appears on the film's soundtrack album. It was also later included on the 1996 Tears for Fears compilation album Saturnine Martial & Lunatic.

== Music video ==
The music video was directed by Dani Jacobs and shows Orzabal and the rest of the group performing in a bar. It also shows brief video fragments of other things including scenes from a boardwalk and a picture of a toothbrush. The overall theme visually was that of a 1990s American southwest.

== Track listings ==
=== US track listing ===
1. "Goodnight Song" – 3:53
2. "New Star" (Roland Orzabal, Alan Griffiths) – 4:29

=== French 2-track CD ===
1. "Goodnight Song" – 3:53
2. "Elemental" (Sons of August mix) (Orzabal, Griffiths) – 5:29

== Charts ==
Chart (1993–1994)	Peak position
Canada Top Singles (RPM)	44
US Bubbling Under Hot 100 (Billboard)	25
