= Ready Boy & Girls? =

EP by Tears for Fears
- Released: 19 April 2014
- Recorded: 2013
- Genre: Synth-pop
- Length: 12:02
- Label: INgrooves

Tears for Fears chronology
Gold (2006)	Ready Boy & Girls? (2014)	Rule the World: The Greatest Hits (2017)

Ready Boy & Girls? is an EP by the English pop rock band Tears for Fears, released as a limited edition 10-inch vinyl in April 2014. The release contains three cover songs that were originally recorded by Animal Collective ("My Girls"), Arcade Fire ("Ready to Start") and Hot Chip ("And I Was a Boy from School"), hence the amalgamated title of the release.

The tracks were recorded by Tears for Fears as a way to kickstart the recording sessions for their seventh album in 2013 (the subsequent album, The Tipping Point, was eventually released nine years later in 2022). Though the three tracks were not intended to be released as official singles, each was made available to stream on the band's SoundCloud page. However, the band were prompted to release them together as a limited edition 10-inch vinyl for 2014 Record Store Day. The EP was Tears for Fears' first wholly new release in ten years, following their 2004 comeback album Everybody Loves a Happy Ending.

== Track listing ==
Digital download

1. "My Girls" (Animal Collective cover) – 4:36
2. "Ready to Start" (Arcade Fire cover) – 3:24
3. "And I Was a Boy from School" (Hot Chip cover) – 4:03
