= Johnny Panic and the Bible of Dreams (song) =

1991 single by Tears for Fears

- UK single B-side label

Song by Tears for Fears
- A-side: "Advice for the Young at Heart"
- Released: 19 February 1990 (B-side)
- Genre: Sampledelia; hip hop
- Length: 4:17; 4:19 (instrumental)
- Label: Fontana
- Songwriter: Roland Orzabal
- Producers: Tears for Fears; Dave Bascombe

"Johnny Panic and the Bible of Dreams"

Single by Johnny Panic and the Bible of Dreams
- Released: 21 January 1991
- Genre: Electronic; new jack swing; trip hop
- Length: 6:22 (mix one); 5:55 (mix two)
- Label: Fontana
- Songwriter: Roland Orzabal
- Producers: Tears for Fears; Dave Bascombe; Fluke (remix and additional production)

Tears for Fears singles chronology
"Famous Last Words" (1990)	"Johnny Panic and the Bible of Dreams" (1991)	"Laid So Low (Tears Roll Down)" (1992)

"Johnny Panic and the Bible of Dreams" is a song by the English band Tears for Fears, originally appearing as the B-side to their 1990 single "Advice for the Young at Heart" before being remixed by the techno producer/DJ band Fluke and released as a single in its own right in 1991. The remix was later included on the band's B-side compilation album Saturnine Martial & Lunatic.

It became a number-one hit on the UK Dance Chart, while reaching number 70 on the UK Singles Chart. Although still a Tears for Fears track, the Fluke remix single was credited only as "Johnny Panic and the Bible of Dreams". The cover of the single features a still photo of Keir Dullea as David Bowman from the movie 2001: A Space Odyssey.

== Background ==
The B-side for "Advice for the Young at Heart" from the Seeds of Love album. The title was stolen from a book of the same name by Sylvia Plath. At the time, I was curious to hear the verse of "Sowing the Seeds [of Love]" sung as a rap and it was this combined with a Talking Heads-style chorus sung over the chord structure of "Shout" that gave rise to the track. Due largely to the use of a rather fashionable (at the time) drumloop, the track received a fair bit of play in dance clubs where it caught the attention of a young band called Fluke who consequently remixed it into a much higher state. The remix was then released anonymously as a single in its own right and got to number 1 in the British dance chart.

— Roland Orzabal (Saturnine Martial and Lunatic booklet)

The song is named after "Johnny Panic and the Bible of Dreams", a short story by Sylvia Plath that was posthumously published in 1977 in a collection of the same name.

The song features two sets of vocals. The original verses of the song are performed in a gospel style, alternating with the lyrics from Tears for Fears' 1989 hit "Sowing the Seeds of Love" which are performed as a rap by vocalist Biti Strauchn. An instrumental version of the song (without the gospel verses or the rap) also appears on the CD single of "Advice for the Young at Heart".

== Track listing ==
1. "Johnny Panic and the Bible of Dreams" (mix one) – 6:22
2. "Johnny Panic and the Bible of Dreams" (mix two) – 5:55

== Personnel ==
Credits are adapted from the liner notes of "Advice for the Young at Heart" and Tidal.

- Biti Strauchn – rap

Tears for Fears

- Curt Smith – producer, bass guitar
- Roland Orzabal – producer, songwriter, drum programming, electric guitar, keyboards, vocals

and

- David Bascombe – producer

Studio personnel

- Heidi Cannavo – assistant recording engineer
- Lee Curle – assistant recording engineer
- Steve Chase – engineer

Fluke remix (1991)

- Fluke – remix, additional production
- Stylorouge – technoart
- Chris Craske – videoburst

== Charts ==
Chart performance for "Johnny Panic and the Bible of Dreams"
Chart (1991)	Peak position
UK Singles (Official Charts)	70
