= Famous Last Words (Tears for Fears song) =

Single by Tears for Fears

from the album The Seeds of Love
- B-side: "Mothers Talk" [US remix]; "Listen"
- Released: 6 August 1990
- Genre: Psychedelic rock
- Length: 4:31
- Label: Fontana
- Songwriters: Roland Orzabal; Nicky Holland
- Producers: Tears for Fears; Dave Bascombe

Tears for Fears singles chronology
"Advice for the Young at Heart" (1990)	"Famous Last Words" (1990)	"Johnny Panic and the Bible of Dreams" (1991)

Music video
- "Famous Last Words" on YouTube

"Famous Last Words" is a song by the English band Tears for Fears, originally released on their 1989 album The Seeds of Love. It was released (by the record company without the band's involvement) as the fourth and final single from the album in 1990 and peaked at number 83 in the UK.

The single was released on various formats including 7" and 12" vinyl, a limited edition 12" vinyl picture disc (only 10,000 copies were pressed, and each copy is numbered), and a limited edition CD-Single (only 5000 copies were pressed, and each copy is numbered).

A promo video was made for the single; this consisted mainly of performance footage from the Going to California live video overdubbed with the studio version of the song and additional video imagery added. When performed live in 1990, the band would often segue from "Famous Last Words" into a rendition of "When the Saints Go Marching In".

== Reception ==
The Pittsburgh Post-Gazette said that the song exemplifies the group's newfound dynamics.

== Track listing ==
- 7-inch single (IDEA 15)
1. "Famous Last Words"
2. "Mothers Talk" (US remix)
- 12-inch (IDEAT 15 / IDPIC 15) and CD single (IDECD 15)
1. "Famous Last Words"
2. "Mothers Talk" (US remix)
3. "Listen"

== Personnel ==
- Roland Orzabal – vocals, guitar
- Curt Smith – bass
- Jon Hassel – trumpet
- Simon Phillips – drums
- Nicky Holland – piano, Kurzweil strings
- Dave Bascombe – producer
