= Dani Jacobs =

British music video director and editor (born 1963)

Dani Jacobs (born April 16, 1963) is a British music video director and editor.

== Background ==
Jacobs was born in London, United Kingdom. He went to University of Manchester to study physics but left to pursue his interests in film.

He worked at The Haçienda nightclub as a resident filmmaker and VJ, creating visuals and lighting effects to project in the club space. The nascent indie scene around Factory Records and dance music scene around The Haçienda assisted his entry into music videos.

== Directing career ==
In 1986, Jacobs formed Swivel with three other partners as a video production company and creative team. Early music videos by Swivel included work for A Guy Called Gerald, James, The Jesus and Mary Chain, The Sundays and 808 State. In 1989, a small article in i-D Magazine helped draw more attention from major record labels and Jacobs moved back to London to set up the Swivel office concentrating on video production.

In 1993, Jacobs directed videos for Tears for Fears, Texas and Steps and joined the US company Squeak Pictures. His subsequent career has included a wide variety of musical acts including, Moby, The Corrs, Gary Barlow, Midge Ure, Phil Collins, BBMak, and Cradle of Filth.

Jacobs has also worked as an editor of music videos, advertisements and television programmes most notably on many recent shows featuring Derren Brown.
