= Laid So Low (Tears Roll Down) =

1992 single by Tears for Fears

Single by Tears for Fears

from the album Tears Roll Down (Greatest Hits 82–92)
- B-side: "The Body Wah"; "Lord of Karma"
- Released: 10 February 1992
- Genre: alternative rock, new wave, dance pop
- Length: 4:44
- Label: Fontana
- Songwriters: Roland Orzabal; Dave Bascombe
- Producers: Roland Orzabal; Tim Palmer

Tears for Fears singles chronology
"Johnny Panic and the Bible of Dreams" (1991)	"Laid So Low (Tears Roll Down)" (1992)	"Woman in Chains" (re-release) (1992)

Alternative cover
- French 2-track promo single

Music video
- "Laid So Low (Tears Roll Down)" on YouTube

"Laid So Low (Tears Roll Down)" is a song by the English band Tears for Fears. It was released as a single in February 1992 by Fontana Records to coincide with the release of the band's greatest hits album Tears Roll Down (Greatest Hits 82–92).

As Curt Smith had already departed the band by this time, "Laid So Low" was effectively the first release of the Roland Orzabal "solo" era of Tears for Fears which would span most of the 1990s. The song was a top-20 hit in the UK, France, Italy and Poland; a top-40 hit in Canada, Germany and the Netherlands; and reached the top 10 on the US Modern Rock Tracks chart.

An earlier, mainly instrumental version of the song appeared as the B-side to the 1989 single "Sowing the Seeds of Love" where it was simply titled "Tears Roll Down". An animated video to this earlier version was included on the 1990 video collection Sowing the Seeds. A video for "Laid So Low" was made in 1992 and was included on the Tears Roll Down (Greatest Hits 82-92) video collection.

== Track listings ==
- 12-inch and CD single
1. "Laid So Low (Tears Roll Down)" – 4:44
2. "The Body Wah" (Roland Orzabal, Alan Griffiths) – 5:21
3. "Lord of Karma" (Roland Orzabal, Alan Griffiths) – 4:45
- 7-inch single
1. "Laid So Low (Tears Roll Down)"
2. "The Body Wah" (Roland Orzabal, Alan Griffiths)

== Charts ==
Weekly chart performance for "Laid So Low (Tears Roll Down)"
Chart (1992)	Peak position
Australia (ARIA)	130
Belgium (Ultratop 50 Flanders)	49
Canada Adult Contemporary (RPM)	33
Canada Top Singles (RPM)	28
France (SNEP)	15
Germany (GfK)	40
Netherlands (Dutch Top 40)	26
Netherlands (Single Top 100)	27
UK Singles (Official Charts)	17
UK Airplay (Music Week)	4
US Alternative Airplay (Billboard)	10

== Release history ==
Release dates and formats for "Laid So Low (Tears Roll Down)"
Region	Date	Format(s)	Label(s)	Ref.
United Kingdom	10 February 1992	7-inch vinyl; 12-inch vinyl pic disc; CD; cassette	Fontana	
Australia	23 March 1992	CD; cassette	Fontana	
Japan	25 March 1992	Mini-CD	Fontana	
