= Break It Down Again =

1993 single by Tears for Fears

Single by Tears for Fears

from the album Elemental
- B-side: "Bloodletting Go"; "Schrödinger's Cat"
- Released: 17 May 1993
- Length: 4:32
- Label: Mercury
- Songwriters: Roland Orzabal; Alan Griffiths
- Producers: Roland Orzabal; Tim Palmer; Alan Griffiths

Tears for Fears singles chronology
"Woman in Chains" (re-release) (1992)	"Break It Down Again" (1993)	"Cold" (1993)

Music video
- "Break It Down Again" on YouTube

"Break It Down Again" is a song by the English pop rock band Tears for Fears, released in May 1993 by Mercury Records as the first single from the band's fourth studio album, Elemental (1993). The song was the second single released after the departure of Curt Smith from the band (after "Laid So Low (Tears Roll Down)" in 1992).

The song reached number 20 in the United Kingdom, number 25 in the United States, and the top 40 in several other countries. It topped the US Billboard Modern Rock Tracks chart and was particularly successful in Canada and Iceland, reaching numbers four and two respectively. The song's accompanying music video was directed by Dani Jacobs.

== Background ==
As with the Elemental album, the song featured Roland Orzabal with peripheral Tears for Fears band members Alan Griffiths and Tim Palmer, plus backing vocals by ex-Graduate bandmate John Baker. "Break It Down Again" is the only song that has regularly remained in live setlists following Smith's return.

== B-sides ==
The CD single included two non-album B-sides, of which "Schrodinger's Cat", the first in a number of songs by Orzabal dealing with modern physics, has acquired a cult status.

Schrodinger's Cat is a famous thought experiment attempting to clarify some of the vagaries of quantum physics. This track didn't make it onto the Elemental album because Alan (Griffiths) and I had such a rambling arrangement which we couldn't rationalize until the time restrictions and relaxed mentality of the B-side enabled it to happen by itself. Musically, it's another attempt to rewrite 'I Am the Walrus' interspersed with a piano break reminiscent of 'Something in the Air'.

— Roland Orzabal

In addition to the mentioned references, the song also quotes the guitar riff from "Sgt. Pepper's Lonely Hearts Club Band". The chorus line was already hinted at in the Tears for Fears cover of "Ashes to Ashes". The sample of a train announcer saying "Last train to Norwich" that runs through "Schrodinger's Cat" appeared again on the song "Master Plan".

The song "Bloodletting Go" is one of the first songs written by Orzabal and Griffiths. Both songs were later included on the B-sides compilation Saturnine Martial & Lunatic.

== Music video ==
The music video for "Break It Down Again" was directed by British music video director and editor Dani Jacobs. It features Orzabal, Griffiths, and Gail Ann Dorsey (who joined Tears for Fears as a touring member) performing the song on the desert plains of El Mirage Lake, California, where the covers for the “Break It Down Again” single and the Elemental album were photographed.

== Track listings ==
- 7-inch single
1. "Break It Down Again"
2. "Bloodletting Go" (Roland Orzabal, Alan Griffiths)
- UK CD single
1. "Break It Down Again"
2. "Bloodletting Go" (Orzabal, Griffiths)
3. "Schrodinger's Cat" (Orzabal, Griffiths)
4. "Break It Down Again" (karaoke version)

== Charts ==
=== Weekly charts ===
Chart (1993)	Peak position
Australia (ARIA)	82
Belgium (Ultratop 50 Flanders)	49
Canada Retail Singles (The Record)	6
Canada Top Singles (RPM)	4
Canada Adult Contemporary (RPM)	14
Europe (Eurochart Hot 100)	47
Europe (European Hit Radio)	4
France (SNEP)	19
Germany (GfK)	66
Iceland (Íslenski Listinn Topp 40)	2
Italy (Musica e dischi)	10
Netherlands (Dutch Top 40)	16
Netherlands (Single Top 100)	27
UK Singles (Official Charts)	20
UK Airplay (Music Week)	5
US Billboard Hot 100	25
US Adult Contemporary (Billboard)	25
US Alternative Airplay (Billboard)	1
US Pop Airplay (Billboard)	10
US Cash Box Top 100	26

=== Year-end charts ===
Chart (1993)	Position
Canada Top Singles (RPM)	39
Europe (European Hit Radio)	28
Iceland (Íslenski Listinn Topp 40)	31
US Billboard Hot 100	91
US Modern Rock Tracks (Billboard)	3

== See also ==
- List of Billboard number-one alternative singles of the 1990s
