= Woman in Chains =

1989 single by Tears for Fears featuring Oleta Adams

Single by Tears for Fears

from the album The Seeds of Love
- B-side: "Always in the Past"; "My Life in the Suicide Ranks"
- Released: 6 November 1989
- Genre: Soul; synth-pop
- Length: 5:28 (single version); 6:30 (album version)
- Label: Fontana
- Songwriter: Roland Orzabal
- Producers: Tears for Fears; Dave Bascombe

Tears for Fears singles chronology
"Sowing the Seeds of Love" (1989)	"Woman in Chains" (1989)	"Advice for the Young at Heart" (1990)

Music video
- "Woman in Chains" on YouTube

"Woman in Chains"

Single by Tears for Fears featuring Oleta Adams

from the album Tears Roll Down (Greatest Hits 82–92)
- B-side: "Ghost Papa"
- Released: 13 April 1992
- Label: Fontana

Tears for Fears singles chronology
"Laid So Low (Tears Roll Down)" (1992)	"Woman in Chains" (1992)	"Break It Down Again" (1993)

Oleta Adams singles chronology
"Don't Let the Sun Go Down On Me" (1991)	"Woman in Chains" (1992)	"I Just Had to Hear Your Voice" (1993)

"Woman in Chains" is a song by the English pop rock band Tears for Fears, released as the second single from their third studio album, The Seeds of Love (1989). It has been described as a "feminist anthem". It was an international success, reaching the top 40 in several countries, including the United Kingdom, the United States, Canada, France, and the Netherlands.

The song prominently features vocals by Oleta Adams, who went on to achieve a successful solo career. It was re-released in 1992 – with a different B-side and now credited to "Tears for Fears featuring Oleta Adams" – to capitalise on the singer's solo success and to promote the Tears for Fears compilation Tears Roll Down (Greatest Hits 82–92). This time, it reached number 57 in the UK.

== Recording ==
In early February 1988, Oleta Adams traveled to Townhouse Studios in London to meet up with Orzabal, Manu Katché, and Pino Palladino for the purpose of recording a series of demos, including "Woman in Chains". David Bascombe was responsible for recording and mixing the song from this session and remarked that "it was astounding to watch and hear them." At the time, he had expressed some reservations over the unstructured format and believed that the "indulgent" nature of these live sessions was not the optimal way to record. He recalled that the band eschewed jamming in favor of "endless takes" and included zero overdubs. The dates of the recording sessions were marked 8–9 February 1988 and transferred over to DAT.

Until the assemblage of The Seeds of Love reissue in 2020, the DAT tapes were under the possession of Orzabal. The tape was sent to Abbey Road Studios and reviewed by Paul Sinclair, who later wrote the liner notes for the box set. On 11 September 2020, the Live Jam Version of "Woman in Chains" was released, which followed the demo recording of "Rhythm of Life", which also emerged from The Townhouse recording sessions.

Portions of the studio cut feature Phil Collins on drums. "Tears for Fears just wanted me to do that big drum thing from 'In the Air Tonight'..." Collins recalled. "'We want you to come in here in a big way.'" Adams was pleased with the final recording and regarded it as "a classic record" that was "very personal" to Orzabal.

== Content ==
"Woman in Chains" was recorded as a duet and has been described as being a soul and synth-pop song. Orzabal explained the impetus for the lyric to Melody Maker: "I was reading some feminist literature at the time and I discovered that there are societies in the world still in existence today that are non-patriarchal. They don't have the man at the top and the women at the bottom. They're matricentric—they have the woman at the centre and these societies are a lot less violent, a lot less greedy and there's generally less animosity... but the song is also about how men traditionally play down the feminine side of their characters and how both men and women suffer for it."

During a 2021 interview with the Louder website, when asked if the song is the feminist anthem it’s usually read as, Orzabal replied: "Um... it was really about my mother. At one point in her life she was a stripper. My father and she ran an entertainment agency from a council house in Portsmouth. So she would go out to strip, and my father would send a driver out with her to spy on her. If she talked to another man, when she came back he would beat her up. So it's about domestic abuse." He posited that the song was a byproduct from his time in therapy, which he believed was conducive for writing "emotional songs".

== Critical reception ==
Billboard wrote that "a melancholy and soulful aura permeate[d]" through the song. David Giles from Music Week wrote, "The best track from the current LP, this starts out promising to be the portentous, pompous rock track that the right-on title suggests, but is rescued by the duo's intuitive pop touches. Watch out for some excellent guitar work." Reviewing the 1992 re-release, Alan Jones of Music Week labelled it as their Pick of the Week, saying that single "deserves to do very well", highlighting the song's instrumentation as "reassuringly lazy and summery".

== Music video ==
The accompanying music video for "Woman in Chains", directed by Andy Morahan, was filmed in black and white. It focuses on the abusive relationship between a man (a boxer) and a woman (a pole-dancer, played by Angela Alvarado); interspersed with shots of the band and guest vocalist Oleta Adams performing the song. It also features Chris Hughes playing the drums.

== Track listings ==
7-inch single (1989)

1. "Woman in Chains"
2. "Always in the Past"

12-inch single (1989)

1. "Woman in Chains"
2. "Always in the Past"
3. "My Life in the Suicide Ranks"
4. "Woman in Chains" (instrumental)

7-inch single (1992)

1. "Woman in Chains"
2. "Badman's Song"

CD single (1992)

1. "Woman in Chains"
2. "Badman's Song"
3. "Ghost Papa"

== Personnel ==
- Roland Orzabal – vocals, keyboards, Fairlight programming, guitar
- Oleta Adams – vocals, keyboards
- Neil Taylor – guitar arpeggio
- Curt Smith – bass guitar
- Pino Palladino – fretless bass
- Manu Katché (start to 3:32) and Phil Collins (from 3:32) – drums
- Luís Jardim – percussion
- Tessa Niles – backing vocals
- Carol Kenyon – backing vocals

== Charts ==
=== Weekly charts ===
Weekly chart performance for "Woman in Chains"
Chart (1989–1990)	Peak position
Australia (ARIA)	39
Belgium (Ultratop 50 Flanders)	32
Canada Top Singles (RPM)	11
Europe (Eurochart Hot 100 Singles)	47
France (SNEP)	20
Ireland (IRMA)	21
Italy Airplay (Music & Media)	4
Netherlands (Dutch Top 40)	12
Netherlands (Single Top 100)	16
New Zealand (Recorded Music NZ)	34
UK Singles (Official Charts)	26
US Billboard Hot 100	36
US Adult Contemporary (Billboard)	37
US Alternative Airplay (Billboard)	27
West Germany (GfK)	45

=== Year-end charts ===
Year-end chart performance for "Woman in Chains"
Chart (1990)	Position
Canada Top Singles (RPM)	87

== Certifications ==
Certifications for "Woman in Chains"
Region	Certification	Certified units/sales
Brazil (Pro-Música Brasil)	Gold	30,000^{‡}
United Kingdom (BPI)	Silver	200,000^{‡}
^{‡} Sales+streaming figures based on certification alone.

== Release history ==
Release dates and formats for "Woman in Chains"
Region	Date	Format(s)	Label(s)	Ref.
United Kingdom	6 November 1989	7-inch vinyl; 12-inch vinyl; CD; cassette	Fontana	
Japan	21 December 1989	Mini-CD	Fontana	
Japan	5 February 1990	Maxi-CD	Fontana	
United Kingdom (re-release)	13 April 1992	7-inch vinyl; 12-inch vinyl; CD	Fontana	
