= Tears for Fears =

English pop rock band

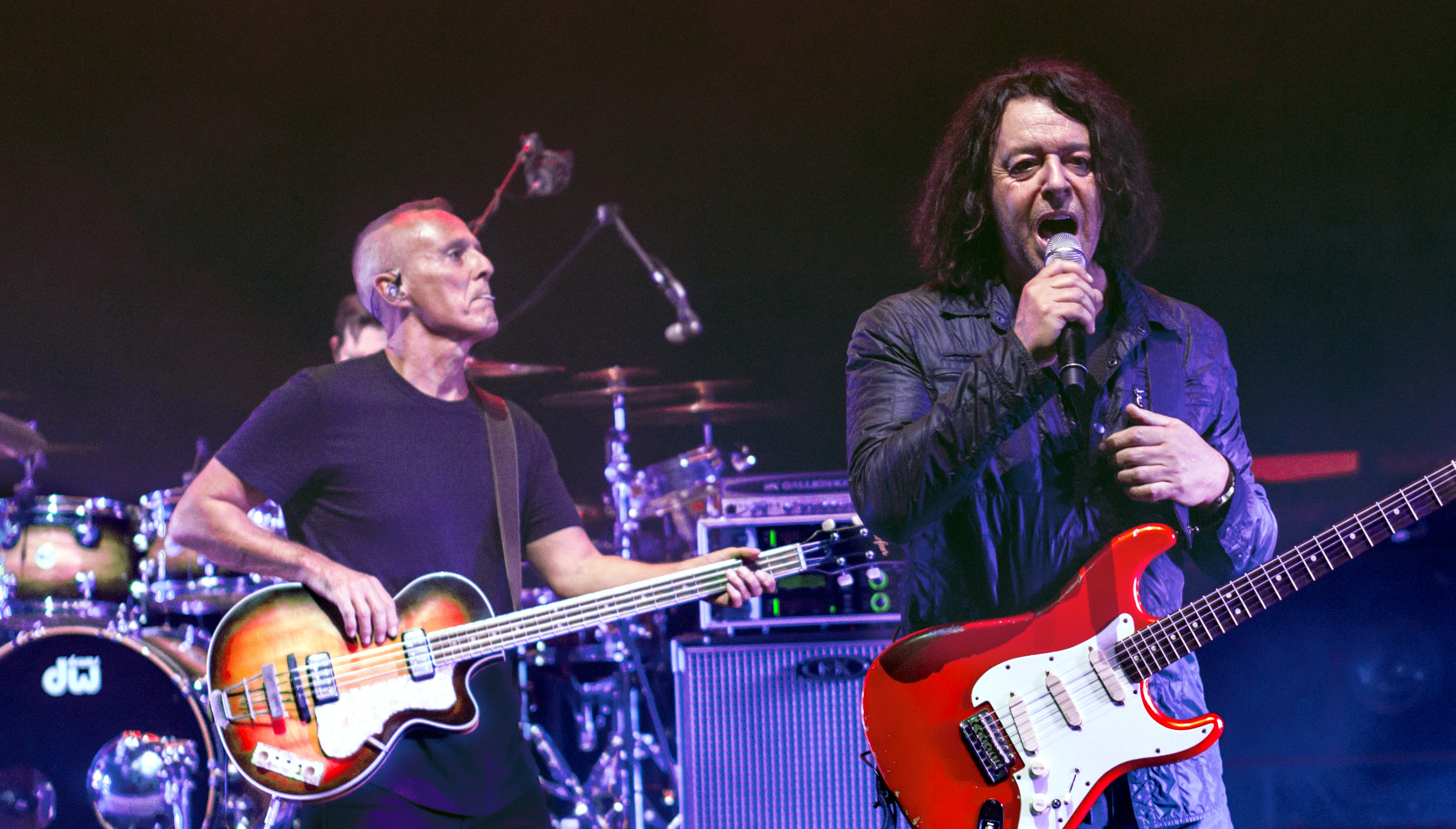
- Tears for Fears in 2017. Curt Smith (left) and Roland Orzabal (right)

Background information
- Origin: Bath, Somerset, England
- Genres: New wave; pop rock; synth-pop
- Works: Discography
- Years active: 1981–present
- Labels: Phonogram; Epic; Gut; Mercury; Fontana; Universal; Concord
- Spinoff of: Graduate
- Members: Roland Orzabal; Curt Smith
- Past members: Manny Elias; Ian Stanley
- Website: tearsforfears.com

Tears for Fears are an English pop rock band formed in Bath in 1981 by Curt Smith and Roland Orzabal. Founded after the dissolution of their first band, the mod-influenced Graduate, Tears for Fears were associated with the synth-pop bands of the 1980s, and attained international chart success as part of the Second British Invasion.

The band's debut studio album, The Hurting (1983), reached number one on the UK Albums Chart, and their first three hit singles – "Mad World", "Change", and "Pale Shelter" – all reached the top five in the UK singles chart. Their second studio album, Songs from the Big Chair (1985), reached number one on the US Billboard 200, achieving multi-platinum status in both the US and the UK. The album contained two US Billboard Hot 100 number one hits: "Shout" and "Everybody Wants to Rule the World"; both songs reached the top five in the UK, and "Everybody Wants to Rule the World" won the Brit Award for Best British Single in 1986. Their third studio album, The Seeds of Love (1989), entered the UK chart at number one and yielded the transatlantic top five hit "Sowing the Seeds of Love".

After touring The Seeds of Love in 1990, Orzabal and Smith had an acrimonious split. Orzabal retained the Tears for Fears name as a solo project, releasing the studio albums Elemental (1993) – which produced the international hit "Break It Down Again" – and Raoul and the Kings of Spain (1995). Orzabal and Smith reconciled in 2000 and released a studio album of new material, Everybody Loves a Happy Ending, in 2004. The duo have toured on a semi-regular basis since then. After being in development for almost a decade, the band's seventh studio album, The Tipping Point, was released in 2022, giving the band their sixth UK top five album and their highest chart peak in thirty years and reaching the Top 10 in numerous other countries, including the US.

In 2021, Orzabal and Smith were honoured with the Ivor Novello Award for 'Outstanding Song Collection' recognising their "era-defining Tears for Fears albums" and "critically acclaimed, innovative hit singles".

== History ==
=== Formation and influences ===
Orzabal and Smith met as teenagers in Bath, Somerset, and bonded over their shared affection for rock groups like Thin Lizzy and Blue Öyster Cult. Their professional debut came with the band Graduate, a mod revival/new wave act whose influences included the Jam and two-tone music. In 1980, Graduate released an album, Acting My Age, and a single "Elvis Should Play Ska" (referring to Elvis Costello). The single just missed the UK pop chart, but performed well in Spain and in Switzerland. The band split in 1981. Shortly afterwards, Orzabal and Smith became session musicians for the band Neon, where they first met future Tears for Fears drummer Manny Elias. Neon also featured Pete Byrne and Rob Fisher, who went on to become Naked Eyes. The pair continued working together, drawing inspiration from artists such as Talking Heads, Peter Gabriel and Brian Eno.

Impressed by the synth-pop sound of Tubeway Army's "Are 'Friends' Electric?" (1979), Orzabal and Smith began to explore the possibilities of electronic music. Their new creative direction was assured upon hearing the work of bands such as Orchestral Manoeuvres in the Dark (OMD), Depeche Mode and the Human League. Orzabal and Smith adopted the "duo" presentation they had seen popularised by the likes of OMD and Soft Cell; Smash Hits compared their early fashion to that of the former. Orzabal was also influenced by post-punk band Joy Division, whose music explored themes of suicidal ideation.

The duo initially assumed the name History of Headaches. Their eventual Tears for Fears moniker was inspired by primal therapy, developed by the American psychologist Arthur Janov, which gained tremendous publicity after John Lennon became Janov's patient in 1970. When Orzabal and Smith finally met Janov in the mid-1980s, they were disillusioned to find he had become quite "Hollywood" and wanted the band to write a musical for him.

As Tears for Fears, Orzabal and Smith intended to form the nucleus of the group and bring in surrounding musicians to help them complete the picture. Around this time they met local musician Ian Stanley, who offered them free use of his home 8-track studio. Stanley began working with the duo as their keyboard-player and, after recording two demos, Tears for Fears were signed to Mercury Records in the UK in 1981 by A&R manager Dave Bates. Their first single, "Suffer the Children", produced by David Lord, was released on that label in November 1981, followed by the first edition of "Pale Shelter" (produced by Mike Howlett) in March 1982, but neither release was successful.

=== The Hurting and first hit singles (1982–1983) ===
The band achieved their first success with their third single, "Mad World", which reached No. 3 in the UK in November 1982. Their first album, The Hurting, was released in March 1983.

The album, produced by Chris Hughes and Ross Cullum, showcased guitar- and synthesizer-based songs with lyrics reflecting Orzabal's bitter childhood and his interest in primal therapy. The album was a big success and had a lengthy chart run (65 weeks) in the UK, where it reached number one and Platinum status. It also reached the top twenty in several other countries and yielded the international hit singles "Mad World" (top five hit in South Africa), "Change" (Top 40 hit in Australia, Canada, Ireland, Israel, Italy, the Netherlands, Poland and South Africa – their first single to reach the US Billboard Hot 100), and a re-recorded version of "Pale Shelter". All three of these singles reached the top five in the UK.

Towards the end of 1983, the band released a new, slightly more experimental single, "The Way You Are", intended as a stopgap while they worked on their second album. The single was a top-30 hit in the UK, but did not come close to matching the success of their three previous hits, despite a national concert tour in December of that year (captured on the In My Mind's Eye live video release). The single, which heavily featured sampling and programmed rhythms, was a departure from Tears for Fears' previous musical approach. In the liner notes to their 1996 B-sides compilation album Saturnine Martial & Lunatic they wrote "this was the point we realised we had to change direction", though the somewhat experimental style of the single continued to be reflected in their forthcoming B-sides.

=== Songs from the Big Chair and worldwide fame (1984–1986) ===
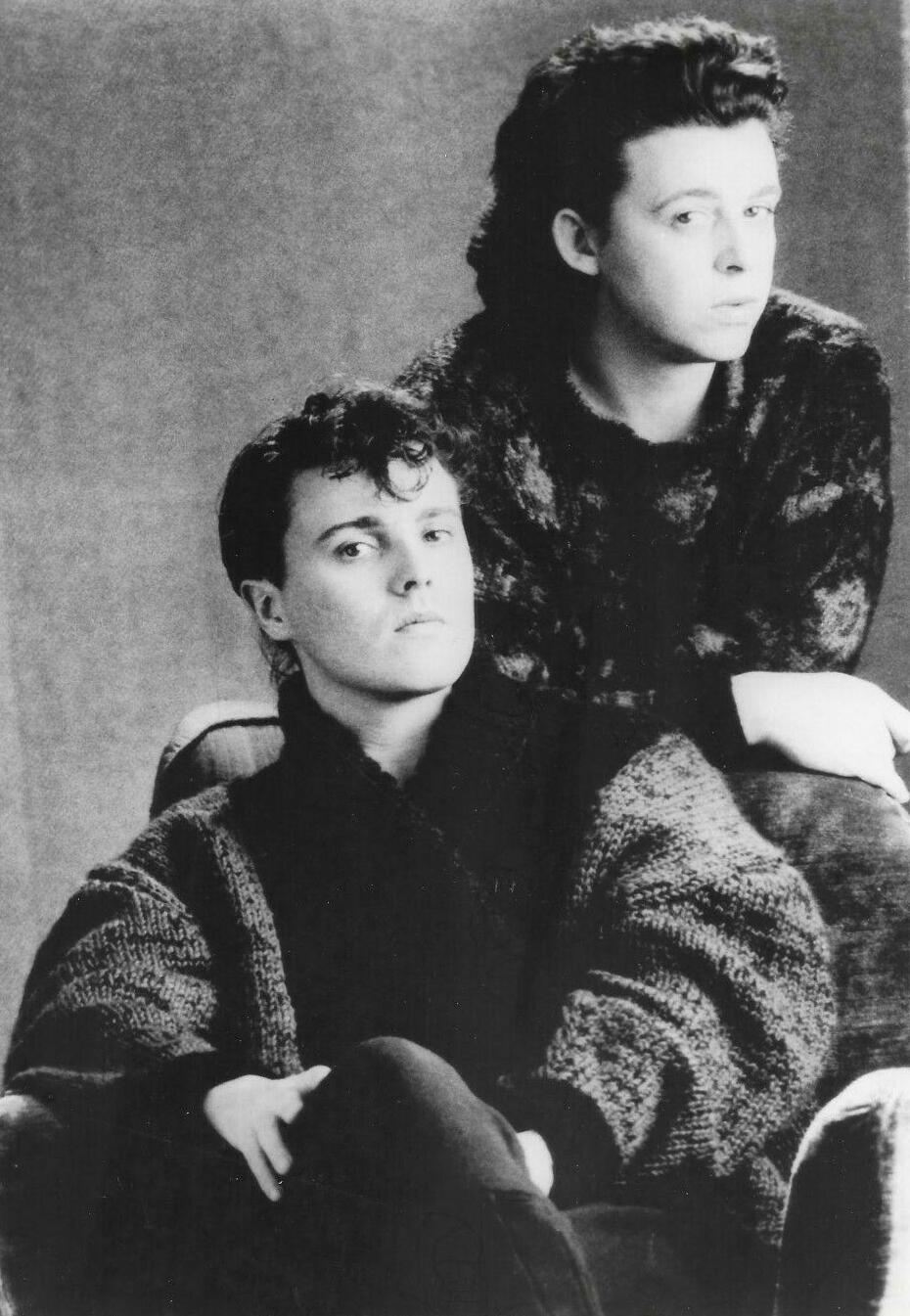
Tears for Fears in a 1985 publicity photo

In early 1984, they began working with a new producer, Jeremy Green, on their new single "Mothers Talk". However, the band were ultimately unhappy with the results and so producer Chris Hughes was brought back into the fold and the "Mothers Talk" single re-produced for release in August 1984. A departure from their earlier works, the single became a top-20 hit in the UK, but it was the follow-up single "Shout" (released in the UK in November 1984) that was the real beginning of the band's international fame.

"Shout", a top-5 UK hit, paved the way for their second album, Songs from the Big Chair (released in February 1985), which entered the UK album chart at No. 2 and remained in the upper reaches of the chart for the next 12 months. They did away with the predominantly synthpop feel of the first album, instead expanding into a more sophisticated sound that would become the band's stylistic hallmark. Anchored on the creative hub of Orzabal, Stanley and producer Hughes, the new Tears for Fears sound helped to propel Songs from the Big Chair into becoming one of the year's biggest sellers worldwide, eventually being certified triple platinum in the UK and quintuple platinum in the US (where it remained the No. 1 album for five weeks in the summer of 1985).

The album's title was inspired by the book and television miniseries Sybil, the chronicle of a woman with dissociative identity disorder who sought refuge in her analyst's "big chair", Orzabal and Smith stating they felt each of the album's songs had a distinctive personality of its own. The band had also recorded a track titled "The Big Chair", which was released as the B-side to "Shout" but was not included on the album.

The album's success came in conjunction with the array of hit singles it yielded: "Mothers Talk" (re-recorded yet again for its US release in 1986), "Shout" (No. 4 UK, No. 1 in the US, Australia, Canada, Germany, the Netherlands, Switzerland and a huge hit in other territories), "Everybody Wants to Rule the World" (their highest-charting UK and Irish hit at No. 2 and another No. 1 in the US and in Canada), "Head over Heels" (UK No. 12, US No. 3, Ireland No. 5, Canada No. 8), and "I Believe (A Soulful Re-Recording)" (UK No. 23 and Ireland No. 10). Some regions even saw the release of limited edition 10" singles for these hits, and a variety of double packs and picture discs in addition to the regular 7" and 12" formats.

Following the album's release, the band went on a world tour that lasted most of the year, playing notably at the Montreux Golden Rose Rock and Pop Festival in May 1985. In September 1985, the band performed "Shout" at the 1985 MTV Video Music Awards at the Radio City Music Hall in New York. Also during the tour, Orzabal and Smith discovered an American female singer/pianist, Oleta Adams, who was performing in a Kansas City hotel bar, and whom they invited to collaborate on their next album. Towards the end of the year, they released a video collection/documentary titled Scenes from the Big Chair.

In February 1986, having completed the lengthy and exhausting Big Chair world tour, Tears for Fears were honoured at the 1986 Brit Awards in London, where they won the Best British Single award for "Everybody Wants to Rule the World". The band was also nominated for Best British Group and Best British Album, and Chris Hughes was nominated for Best Producer. Tears for Fears performed the song at the ceremony, which became the final public performance of drummer Manny Elias who left the group shortly afterwards.

At the same time, the band was nominated for Favorite Pop/Rock Duo/Group and Favorite Pop/Rock Duo/Group Video Artist at the 1986 American Music Awards in Los Angeles; performing "Everybody Wants to Rule the World" during the TV show. And in April, a remixed version of "Mothers Talk" was released in North America, reaching the US Top 40.

The same year, Orzabal and Stanley worked together on a side project named Mancrab and released a single, "Fish for Life", which was written for the soundtrack of the film The Karate Kid, Part II. The track was written and produced by Orzabal and Stanley, and featured vocals by US singer/dancer Eddie Thomas, who was one of the dancers in the video for "Everybody Wants to Rule the World".

==== Live Aid ====
On 13 July 1985, Tears for Fears were scheduled to perform at JFK Stadium in Philadelphia for the Live Aid charity event. However, on the morning of the event, it was announced that the band (who had actually been billed to appear before they had even agreed to do so) had pulled out of the show. They were replaced by blues rock group George Thorogood and the Destroyers, which had a strong Philadelphia-area following. The official reason given for their non-appearance was that two of their backing musicians, guitarist Andrew Sanders and saxophonist Will Gregory, had quit due to the expiration of their contract; they were replaced by Alan Griffiths on guitar and Josephine Wells on saxophone for the remaining bulk of the 1985 world tour. In place of appearing, the band pledged to donate proceeds from their concerts played in Tokyo, Sydney, London and New York.

As a further donation, the band also recorded a slightly rewritten version of one of their biggest hits and released it for the British fundraising initiative Sport Aid in 1986, a sister project of Band Aid in which people took part in running races of varying length and seriousness to raise more money for African famine relief projects. Sport Aid's slogan was "I Ran the World", therefore Tears for Fears released "Everybody Wants to Run the World" (No. 5 in the UK and No. 4 in Ireland). Indirectly, the band were involved in the earlier Band Aid single "Do They Know It's Christmas?" from 1984, which featured a slowed down sample from their song "The Hurting" (from their debut album of the same name) in the introduction.

=== The Seeds of Love (1987–1990) ===
It was 1989 before the group released their third album, The Seeds of Love (on which Ian Stanley appeared for the last time as a member of Tears for Fears), at a reported production cost of over a million pounds. With Stanley and Chris Hughes having both left the project and the band early during the recording sessions due to creative differences, the album was written largely by Orzabal along with keyboardist Nicky Holland (who had toured with Tears for Fears on their "Big Chair" world tour in 1985). Moving from various studios and using various sets of producers over many months, the band ultimately decided to scrap the recordings and take the reins themselves with assistance from engineer Dave Bascombe. Much of the material was recorded in jam sessions and later edited down. The length of the production was difficult for the band's management company, which had financially over-extended itself in other business matters and was hoping for an earlier release date to pay off its debts.

The album retained the band's classic sound while showing increasing influences ranging from jazz and blues to the Beatles, the latter being evident on the hit single "Sowing the Seeds of Love". The second single from the album was "Woman in Chains" (a Top 40 hit in the UK, Canada, France, Ireland, Italy, Netherlands, Sweden and the US), on which Phil Collins played drums and Oleta Adams—whom Orzabal would later guide to a successful solo career—shared vocals.

The album was a worldwide success, entering the UK Albums Chart at No. 1, making the Top 10 in the US and in numerous other countries, eventually going on to sell millions of copies internationally. The band set out on an extensive "Seeds of Love" world tour sponsored by Philips to start recovering the debt incurred during the recording process. The band's show in Santa Barbara, California, in May 1990 would be captured on the Going to California live video as the singles "Advice for the Young at Heart" and "Famous Last Words" delivered modest chart success.

A 64-page companion book, simply titled Tears for Fears – The Seeds of Love, was released by Virgin Books in 1990 and offered extensive insight from Orzabal, Holland and Adams into the songwriting and production process for the album, as well as the musical scores for each track and rare promotional photographs from the era.

=== Break-up (1991–1992) ===
After The Seeds of Love, Orzabal and Smith had an acrimonious falling out and parted company in 1991. The split was blamed on Orzabal's perfectionist approach to production and delays caused by Smith's jetsetting lifestyle and desire to slow down the pace of their work (Smith was also going through a divorce at the time). Another factor in the break-up was the band's manager, Paul King, who declared bankruptcy in 1990 and was later convicted of fraud in 2004.

Following the break-up, Orzabal retained the Tears for Fears name and released the 1992 single "Laid So Low (Tears Roll Down)". The single was released to promote the band's greatest hits collection Tears Roll Down (Greatest Hits 82–92), which featured every single to reach the top twenty, either in the UK or internationally, apart from the Sport Aid fundraiser. The album peaked at No. 2 in the UK, where it was certified double Platinum, and also reached the Top 10 in several other countries, including France, Italy and New Zealand.

=== Solo era: Elemental and Raoul and the Kings of Spain (1993–1999) ===
In 1993, Orzabal (still under the name Tears for Fears) released the album Elemental together with longtime collaborator Alan Griffiths. Co-produced by Tim Palmer, it yielded the international hit "Break It Down Again" (top twenty in the UK, Canada, France, and Italy) and was supported with another successful world tour, including a college tour of the US where "Break It Down Again" reached No. 25. Although its chart position of No. 45 was considerably lower in the US than the previous two albums, it still earned a Gold disc there for sales of over half a million copies.

Orzabal, still working with Griffiths and Palmer, released another Tears for Fears album, Raoul and the Kings of Spain, in 1995. This album was a more contemplative work that delved into his own Spanish heritage and showcased a new Latin musical influence (Raoul was originally the name Orzabal's parents wanted to give him, and is also the name of his own first son). The album was not a commercial success by Tears for Fears standards, though minor chart success came via the single release of the title track (Top 40 in the UK) and (to a lesser extent) the single "God's Mistake".

In 1996 a B-sides compilation album, Saturnine Martial & Lunatic, was released on Mercury, which included B-sides and some rare tracks from the successful 1982–93 period.

=== Reunion: Everybody Loves a Happy Ending (2000–2009) ===
Around 2000, the duo began talking again after Orzabal helped Smith with some routine legal paperwork. Smith flew back to England (where Orzabal still lived) and they had dinner and decided to work on a new album together.

The songwriting sessions included Charlton Pettus (Smith's collaborator since the mid-1990s), and 14 songs were written and recorded in less than six months. After initially being signed to Arista Records by L.A. Reid in 2003, record company mergers and the departure of Reid led to the band opting to terminate the contract. The ensuing album, Everybody Loves a Happy Ending, was eventually released in September 2004 on New Door Records in the U.S. Two U.S. tours followed, and the 2004 tour included an unrehearsed guest appearance by Oleta Adams at the Kansas City show for a performance of "Woman in Chains".

Everybody Loves a Happy Ending was released in the UK and Europe in March 2005 on Gut Records, shortly after the comeback single "Closest Thing to Heaven" became the first Tears for Fears UK Top 40 hit in a decade. The promo video for the single was a colourful fantasy that featured Hollywood actress Brittany Murphy riding in a hot air balloon. The European releases of the album contained all fourteen tracks recorded during the recording sessions, while the US version only contained twelve. A brief tour of larger UK venues followed in April.

A live performance at the Parc des Princes stadium in Paris, recorded in June 2005, was released on CD and DVD in France and Benelux. Titled Secret World – Live in Paris, it was released on the XIII Bis label in early 2006 and became a best-seller, with over 70,000 physical copies sold in addition to downloads. The CD contained a new studio song, "Floating Down the River", and a remastered Curt Smith/Mayfield track, "What Are We Fighting For?".

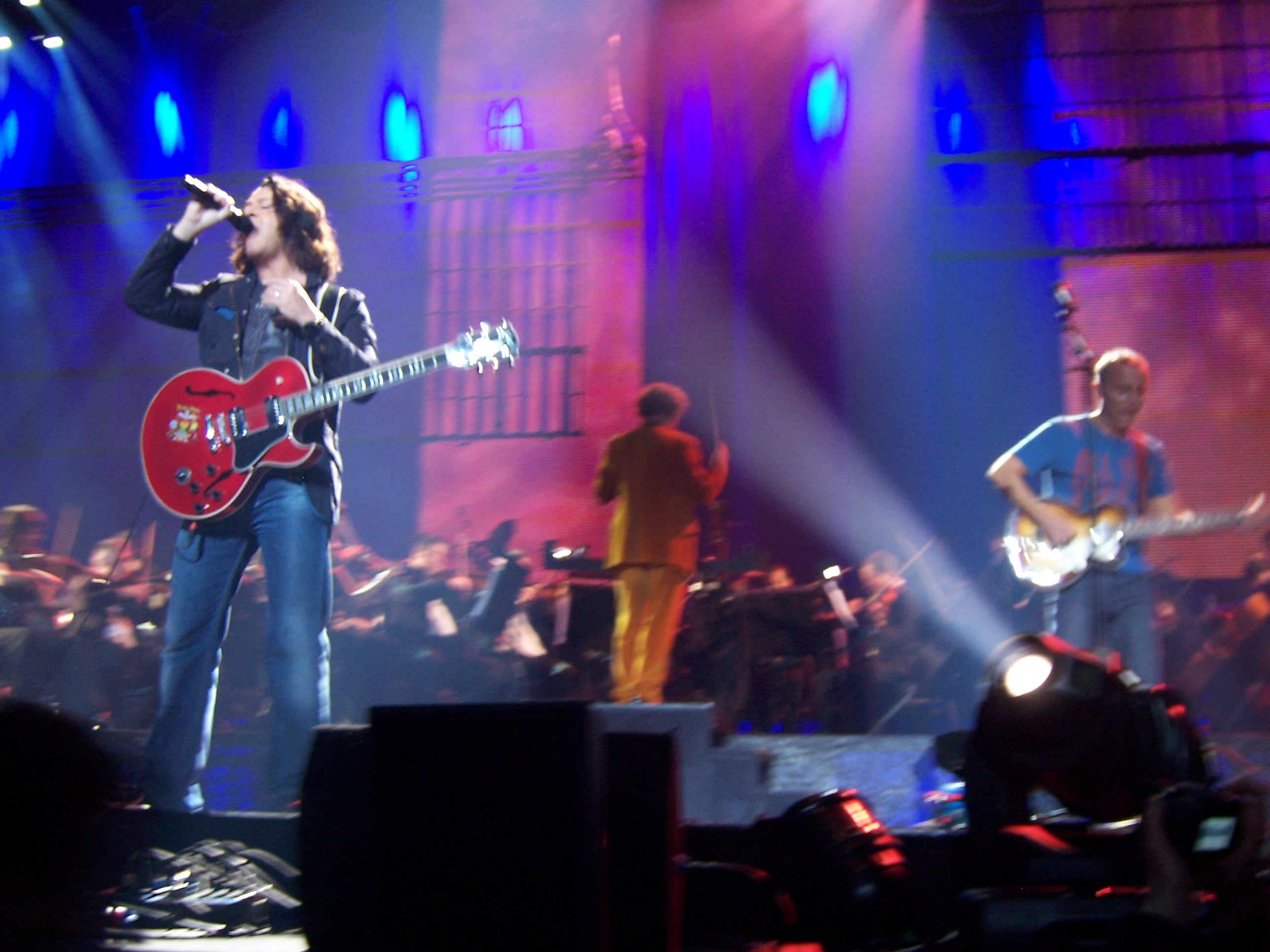
Roland Orzabal and Curt Smith in 2008.

During this period, "Mad World" was re-recorded by Michael Andrews and Gary Jules for the soundtrack of the 2001's film Donnie Darko; a 2003 single release of the song reached number one in the UK for three consecutive weeks and won Orzabal his second Ivor Novello Award. This version also reached the Top 40 in numerous other countries between 2003 and 2013.

In 2006, Songs from the Big Chair was re-issued again by Universal Music. It included the rare piano version of "The Working Hour", which had previously only been available as a limited edition item.

The band participated in the annual Night of the Proms concerts in Belgium in 2006, 2007 & 2008.

In August 2009, the Raoul and the Kings of Spain album was also re-issued by Cherry Red Records, featuring seven bonus B-side tracks from the time of its original release.

=== 2010–2020 ===
In April 2010, Tears for Fears joined the reformed 1980s group Spandau Ballet on their seven-date tour of Australia and New Zealand, before a four-date headlining tour of their own in Southeast Asia (Philippines, Singapore, Hong Kong and Taiwan) and a 17-date tour of the United States. In 2011 and 2012, they played dates in the US, Japan, South Korea, Manila and South America.

In May 2013, Smith confirmed that he was writing and recording new Tears for Fears material with Orzabal and Charlton Pettus. In August 2013, Tears for Fears released their first newly recorded material in nearly a decade, with a cover of Arcade Fire's "Ready to Start" made available on SoundCloud. In 2014, the track was included on a limited edition 3-track 10" vinyl EP from the band called Ready Boy & Girls?, released exclusively for Record Store Day, which also featured covers of Hot Chip's "Boy from School" and Animal Collective's "My Girls". All three songs were recorded as "kick-start" projects as the band commenced work on their seventh studio album. In an interview on BBC Radio Devon in October 2014, Orzabal stated that the band had now signed to Warner Music Group and that around five or six songs had so far been completed for the new album.

To commemorate the 30th anniversary of the band's debut album, The Hurting, Universal Music reissued it in October 2013 in two deluxe editions. Deluxe editions of the band's second album, Songs from the Big Chair, were released on 10 November 2014. On 12 November 2014, Tears for Fears performed "Everybody Wants to Rule the World" on ABC's Jimmy Kimmel Live! TV programme. In mid 2015, the band began a series of live dates in the United States and Canada.

In July 2016, the band played their first live dates in the UK in over ten years: the Newmarket Nights festival at Newmarket Racecourse on 29 July and a closing night headlining appearance at Camp Bestival at Lulworth Castle in Dorset on 31 July. The gigs marked the band's first UK festival appearances since Knebworth in 1990. The band again toured the United States and Canada in September and October 2016.

In 2017, the band toured North America with co-headliners Hall & Oates, and also played in Israel, at the British Summer Time Festival in London's Hyde Park on 8 July, and at the Rock in Rio festival in Brazil on 22 September. In a July 2017 interview, Orzabal stated that the band had collaborated with songwriter/producer Sacha Skarbek on their seventh album, The Tipping Point, and divulged several song titles from it including "My Demons", "I Love You but I'm Lost", "End of Night" and "Up Above the World". In an interview with SiriusXM Canada the same month, Orzabal divulged that although the band had signed with Warner Music to release their new album (which had been scheduled for October 2017), Universal Music had then approached Warner Music about buying the rights to the album so that they could release it (Universal being the rights holders of the vast majority of the band's back catalogue).

Roland Orzabal's wife, Caroline, died in the summer of 2017. Tears for Fears initially withdrew from the remaining shows on their pending North American tour, but they resumed the tour in September 2017 at the Staples Center in Los Angeles. During his late wife's illness, Orzabal began writing songs that appear on the 2022 Tears for Fears album, The Tipping Point.

On 26 October 2017, the band performed a 65-minute live set at the BBC Radio Theatre in London for the Radio 2 in Concert series, which was broadcast on both radio and television (via the BBC Red Button service). The following night, the band played their first full-length UK concert since 2005, at London's Royal Albert Hall. Prior to this, on 12 October, "I Love You but I'm Lost" was released as a single from a new 16-track Tears For Fears compilation album titled Rule the World: The Greatest Hits. In October 2017, the band announced an 11-date UK arena tour for April–May 2018, featuring Alison Moyet as the support act. However, the tour was postponed to early 2019 due to Orzabal's health problems following the death of his wife.

The band performed at further UK and European festivals in the summer of 2019, starting with the Hampton Court Palace Festival on 18 and 19 June, the Forest Live festival at Delamere Forest on 21 June, and the Nocturne Live Concert Series at Blenheim Palace on 22 June.

In February 2020, Songs from the Big Chair was the subject of an episode of the BBC series Classic Albums featuring new interviews with the band and all key personnel from the album's creation and subsequent success. To coincide with the album's 35th anniversary, the 2014 deluxe boxed set was reissued by Universal Music, as well as a new 12-inch vinyl picture disc of the album.

In October 2020, The Seeds of Love album was reissued as various deluxe editions and returned the band to the UK Top 40.

In November 2020, after a change in management, Everybody Loves a Happy Ending was made available through various streaming services for the first time.

=== The Tipping Point and Songs for a Nervous Planet (2021–present) ===
On 12 June 2021, Tears for Fears released the live double album Live at Massey Hall (recorded in 1985) for Record Store Day and in September, Orzabal and Smith were honoured at the Ivor Novello Awards.

On 7 October 2021, Smith appeared on the BBC Radio 2 programme The Zoe Ball Breakfast Show to introduce the band's single "The Tipping Point", the first track from their seventh album, The Tipping Point, released on Concord Records on 25 February 2022.

In November 2021, Tears for Fears announced a summer tour of the US and UK to commence in May 2022. The band had to cancel the tour before its completion, due to Smith suffering four broken ribs in a road accident in July 2022. Two further singles, "No Small Thing" and "Break the Man", were released before the album (respectively in early December 2021 and mid-January 2022).

The Tipping Point received largely positive reviews from critics and entered the UK Charts at number 2 while topping the UK Album Sales Chart, the UK Physical Albums Sales Chart, the UK Downloads Albums Chart, the UK Vinyl Albums Chart, as well as the Scottish regional album chart. It also reached the Top 10 in numerous other countries (entering the US Billboard 200 at number 8) and topped the US Billboard's Top Alternative Albums, Top Rock Albums and Top Album Sales charts.

On 1 June 2022, a video was released for the song "My Demons" (the fourth single from The Tipping Point), and while the band was on tour, "Everybody Wants to Rule the World" re-entered the UK Singles Chart and entered the Billboard Global 200.

In April 2023, Tears for Fears announced the second part of the Tipping Point World Tour. In June 2023, "Everybody Wants to Rule the World" returned to the UK Singles Chart once again for an additional 22-week chart run, reaching its peak position at number 72 in September.

On 12 September 2024, Tears for Fears announced the release of the Songs for a Nervous Planet album, featuring eighteen live tracks, recorded on 11 July 2023 in Franklin, Tennessee, during the band's Tipping Point World Tour, as well as four (or five in some limited editions) new studio tracks. Two of the new tracks were released as singles from the album before its issue: "The Girl That I Call Home" on 12 September and "Astronaut" on 4 October 2024. Songs for a Nervous Planet entered the Top 10 in the UK (becoming the band's seventh UK Top 10 album) and the Top 40 in several other countries.

In November 2025, Songs from the Big Chair was released in a special edition to celebrate its 40th anniversary. This re-release reached the Top 40 in the UK and also charted in Austria, Belgium and The Netherlands, and "Everybody Wants to Rule the World" returned to the UK Singles Chart.

== Awards and nominations ==
Award	Year	Nominee(s)	Category	Result	Ref.
BRIT Awards	1986	Everybody Wants to Rule the World	Brit Award for Song of the Year	Won	
Hungarian Music Awards	2026	Songs for a Nervous Planet	Foreign Alternative/Indie Rock Album	Nominated	

== Band members ==
Current members

- Roland Orzabal – guitars, keyboards, lead and backing vocals, bass (1981–present)
- Curt Smith – bass, keyboards, lead and backing vocals (1981–1991, 2000–present)

Current touring band

- Charlton Pettus – guitar, keyboards
- Douglas Petty – keyboards
- Jamie Wollam – drums

Former members

- Ian Stanley – keyboards, backing vocals (1981–1987)
- Manny Elias – drums, percussion (1981–1986)

== Line-ups ==
Period	Members	Releases
August 1981 – May 1986	Roland Orzabal – guitar, vocals; Curt Smith – bass, vocals; Manny Elias – electronic drums; Ian Stanley – synthesizers	"Suffer the Children" (1981); The Hurting (1983); Songs from the Big Chair (1985); Saturnine Martial & Lunatic compilation (1981–1986/1996) – seven tracks; "Everybody Wants to Run the World" (1986)
June 1986 – July 1987	Roland Orzabal – guitar, vocals; Curt Smith – bass, vocals; Ian Stanley – synthesizers; with: Chris Hughes – electronic drums; Manu Katché – drums	The Seeds of Love (1987/1989) – two tracks, "Woman in Chains" and "Sowing the Seeds of Love"; Saturnine Martial & Lunatic compilation (1987/1996) – one track, "Always in the Past"
August 1987 – January 1991	Roland Orzabal – guitar, vocals, keyboards; Curt Smith – bass, vocals, keyboards; with: Nicky Holland – keyboard, synthesizers, backing vocals; Luís Jardim – drums	The Seeds of Love (1989) – other tracks; Saturnine Martial & Lunatic compilation (1987–1991/1996) – three tracks, "Johnny Panic and the Bible of Dreams", "My Life in the Suicide Ranks" and "Tears Roll Down"
February 1991 – July 1996	Roland Orzabal – guitar, vocals, keyboards, bass; with: Alan Griffiths – keyboards, programming, guitars; Gail Ann Dorsey – bass; Brian MacLeod – drums	"Laid So Low" (1992); Elemental (1993); Raoul and the Kings of Spain (1995); Saturnine Martial & Lunatic compilation (1991–1996/1996) – other tracks
August 1996 – September 2001	Roland Orzabal: Roland Orzabal – guitar, vocals, keyboards, bass; with: Alan Griffiths – keyboards, programming, guitars; Gail Ann Dorsey – bass; Nick D'Virgilio – drums	none
October 2001 – February 2006	Roland Orzabal – guitar, vocals, keyboards; Curt Smith – bass, vocals, keyboards; with: Nick D'Virgilio – drums; Doug Petty – keyboards; Charlton Pettus – guitar, bass, keyboards	Everybody Loves a Happy Ending (2004); Secret World live album (2006)
March 2006 – present	Roland Orzabal – guitar, vocals, keyboards; Curt Smith – bass, vocals, keyboards; with: Doug Petty – keyboards; Charlton Pettus – guitar, bass, keyboards; Jamie Wollam – drums	Ready Boy & Girls? EP (2014); I Love You but I'm Lost single (2017); The Tipping Point (2022); Songs for a Nervous Planet live album (2024)

== Discography ==
Studio albums

- The Hurting (1983)
- Songs from the Big Chair (1985)
- The Seeds of Love (1989)
- Elemental (1993)
- Raoul and the Kings of Spain (1995)
- Everybody Loves a Happy Ending (2004)
- The Tipping Point (2022)

== See also ==
- List of artists who reached number one in the United States
- List of artists who reached number one on the U.S. dance chart
- List of Billboard number-one dance hits
- List of Billboard number-one singles
