= Advice for the Young at Heart =

Single by Tears for Fears

from the album The Seeds of Love
- B-side: "Johnny Panic and the Bible of Dreams"; "Music for Tables"
- Released: 19 February 1990
- Genre: Blue-eyed soul; jazz; pop; sophisti-pop
- Length: 4:55 (album version); 4:49 (7" version)
- Label: Fontana
- Songwriters: Roland Orzabal; Nicky Holland
- Producers: Tears for Fears; Dave Bascombe

Tears for Fears singles chronology
"Woman in Chains" (1989)	"Advice for the Young at Heart" (1990)	"Famous Last Words" (1990)

Music video
- "Advice for the Young at Heart" on YouTube

"Advice for the Young at Heart" is a song by the English band Tears for Fears, taken from their 1989 album The Seeds of Love. It was released as the third single from the album in February 1990.

The song was written by Roland Orzabal and keyboardist/singer Nicky Holland. The lead vocal was sung by Curt Smith (the only track on The Seeds of Love album that he sang solo lead vocals on).

The single only reached #89 in the US Billboard 100 but was a Top 40 hit in the UK (#36), France (#31), Canada (#25) and The Netherlands (#22), and a Top 20 hit in Ireland (#15). In 1992, when Tears for Fears released Tears Roll Down (Greatest Hits 82–92), "Advice for the Young at Heart" was re-released in Brazil.

While the album version was mixed by David Bascombe, the single version was mixed by Bob Clearmountain. The single mix was included on the 2020 deluxe edition of The Seeds of Love.

== Music video ==
The video for the song was filmed in Florida and was directed by Andy Morahan. It features a wedding interspersed with shots of the band performing.

== Critical reception ==
David Giles of Music Week presented "Advice for the Young at Heart" as a "fairly lightweight track" from the parent album, "less pompous than [Tears for Fears] are capable of and produced with such tender care that you can almost smell the polish"; however, he criticized the commercial strategy of releasing the song under multiple formats. A review in pan-European magazine Music & Media deemed it "one of the most blatantly psychedelic songs from The Seeds of Love", adding: "It has a laid-back and subtly seductive tune reminiscent of some of Prefab Sprout's material".

== Track listings ==
CD single

1. "Advice for the Young at Heart" — 4:49
2. "Johnny Panic and the Bible of Dreams" — 4:16
3. "Music for Tables" — 3:32
4. "Johnny Panic And the Bible of Dreams" (instrumental) — 4:18

7" single

1. "Advice for the Young at Heart" — 4:45
2. "Johnny Panic and the Bible of Dreams" — 4:16

12" single

1. "Advice for the Young at Heart" — 4:49
2. "Johnny Panic and the Bible of Dreams" — 4:16
3. "Music for Tables" — 3:32

== Personnel ==
Personnel are taken from the single CD liner notes and The Seeds Of Love album liner notes (except for the vocals and drum programming, which are taken from the description of the song on YouTube, in particular, the version in this citation). The lead vocals are uncredited, but are done by Curt Smith.

- Curt Smith – bass, lead vocals
- Roland Orzabal – guitar, drum programming, keyboards, backing vocals
- Simon Clark – hammond organ
- Nicky Holland – piano, backing vocals
- Maggie Ryder – backing vocals

== Charts ==
=== Weekly charts ===
Chart (1990)	Peak position
Australia (ARIA)	116
Belgium (Ultratop 50 Flanders)	34
Canada (RPM)	25
Europe (Eurochart Hot 100)	76
European Airplay (Music & Media)	5
France (SNEP)	31
Ireland (IRMA)	15
Italy (FIMI)	49
Netherlands (Single Top 100)	22
UK Singles (Official Charts)	36
U.S. Billboard Hot 100	89
U.S. Billboard Hot Adult Contemporary Tracks	24
West Germany (GfK)	51
