= Sowing the Seeds of Love =

1989 single by Tears for Fears

Single by Tears for Fears

from the album The Seeds of Love
- B-side: "Tears Roll Down"
- Released: 21 August 1989
- Genre: Psychedelic pop; baroque pop; art pop; orchestral pop; pop-soul
- Length: 6:19 (album version); 6:50 (full version); 5:48 (single edit); 4:04 (US radio edit)
- Label: Fontana
- Songwriters: Roland Orzabal; Curt Smith
- Producers: Tears for Fears; Dave Bascombe

Tears for Fears singles chronology
"Mothers Talk" (US remix) (1986)	"Sowing the Seeds of Love" (1989)	"Woman in Chains" (1989)

Music video
- "Sowing the Seeds of Love" on YouTube

"Sowing the Seeds of Love" is a song by the English pop rock band Tears for Fears. It was released on 21 August 1989 as the first single from their third studio album, The Seeds of Love (1989).

The song was a worldwide hit, topping the Canadian RPM 100 Singles chart and reaching the top 10 in Ireland, Italy, the Netherlands, New Zealand, Spain, Sweden, and the United Kingdom. In the United States, it reached No. 2 on the Billboard Hot 100, becoming their fourth and last top 10 hit. It also reached No. 1 on both the Modern Rock Tracks chart and the Cash Box Top 100.

== Composition ==
The song's title was inspired by a radio programme that Roland Orzabal had heard at the time about the folk song collector Cecil Sharp. One of the songs that Sharp collected was called "The Seeds of Love", which he learned from a gardener called Mr. England, which was reflected in the lyric "Mr. England sowing the seeds of love". Sharp overheard John England singing the song, and was inspired to look more deeply into English traditional songs. "The Seeds of Love" was therefore the first song that Sharp collected, and the one that sparked the English folk song revival.

Orzabal wrote the song in June 1987 during the week of the UK General Election in which Margaret Thatcher and the Conservative Party won a third consecutive term in office. The election prompted him to take an interest in politics, with a special interest in socialism due to Thatcher's attitudes towards the working class. At the time of its release in 1989, Orzabal considered this to be the most overtly political song that Tears for Fears had ever recorded. The lyrics refer to Thatcher specifically with the line "Politician granny with your high ideals, have you no idea how the majority feels?" (Note: That year, Mrs Thatcher having had her first grandchild born.)

Elsewhere, the song takes a dig at fellow musician Paul Weller with the line "Kick out the style, bring back the jam" as Orzabal felt Weller had lost touch with his working class political outlook after the dissolution of his previous band The Jam in lieu of the less political material he was writing with his then-current band The Style Council. In the third verse, the lyrics mention a sunflower, which references a piece of graffiti that Orzabal found on a wall near his house in London.

== Recording ==
Orzabal recorded the "Sowing the Seeds of Love" demo with a Fairlight CMI with vocals. It was then tracked at Townhouse Studios with Orzabal on electric piano and vocals, Curt Smith on bass guitar, Chris Hughes on drums, and Ian Stanley on Hammond organ. David Bascombe, who served as the engineer and producer for these sessions, said that he tried to coax Stanley into overdubbing another take on Hammond organ, but he expressed no interest in doing so. He called Stanley's organ part "fantastic", but said that Stanley did not "rate himself as a keyboard player at all, so it was always a bit like pulling teeth."

"Sowing the Seeds of Love" incorporates a number of musical styles and recording techniques, with a number of reviewers considering it a pastiche of the Beatles, produced in a tempo and style reminiscent of their late 1960s output, even for the use of a brief trumpet line very similar to the one that can be heard in "Penny Lane". Orzabal took further inspiration from "I Am the Walrus" when developing the song, including the tempo changes. Bascombe, recalled that the band derived the tempo from a parody of "I Am the Walrus" titled "Piggy in the Middle", which was created by The Rutles.

== Critical reception ==
David Giles from Music Week wrote, "They've pulled out all the stops here. There seems to be three or four different songs all competing for prominence, but it's the full-blown rousing chorus that wins through, and don't be surprised to see it hurtling number one-wards." Music & Media called it "one of the most psychedelic and intriguing singles releases this year" with "trippy music" that was reminiscent of The Beatles's 1967 music.

Stephen Holden of The New York Times thought that the song evoked the "treadmill rhythms, trumpet-laced textures and exhortatory mood of 'Sgt. Pepper's Lonely Hearts Club Band'" by The Beatles. David Marsh of The Guardian also noted several musical references that evoked the work of The Beatles, including "I Am the Walrus", Penny Lane", and "A Day in the Life". He also highlighted some of the production choices, including the "random shouts, screams and whoops in the background."

== Music video ==
The accompanying music video for "Sowing the Seeds of Love" was directed by Jim Blashfield, who had already made acclaimed videos for Joni Mitchell ("Good Friends"), Paul Simon ("The Boy in the Bubble") and Michael Jackson ("Leave Me Alone"). Joanna Priestley directed the "Joan Miró" section of the video for Jim Blashfield and Associates. It was animated with pencil on paper, transferred to punched acetate sheets and painted with Cel Vinyl acrylic paints. The video won two awards at the MTV Music Video Awards: Best Breakthrough Video and Best Special Effects. It was also nominated in the "Best Group Video" and "Best Postmodern Video" categories.

== Release ==
The single was released in August 1989 on multiple formats, including a 7-inch single, a 12-inch single, a 12-inch picture disc, a cassette single, and a CD single. An abridged version of "Sowing the Seeds of Love" was included on the 7-inch single, which was trimmed to 5 minutes and 43 seconds in duration. The 12-inch single included the full version of "Sowing the Seeds of Love" with "Tears Roll Down", a largely instrumental non-album track as the B-side. Orzabal reworked "Tears Roll Down" into "Laid So Low (Tears Roll Down)" for the release of the band's Tears Roll Down (Greatest Hits 82–92) compilation album.

In the United States, "Sowing the Seeds of Love" debuted on the Billboard Hot 100 at No. 53 on the week dated 2 September 1989. During its ninth week on the chart, it peaked at No. 2. As such, the song became the band's highest-charting single in the United States since "Shout". It spent 15 weeks in the top 100; all but three of those weeks were spent in the top 40. Orzabal commented that the song's failure to reach number one "gave the American record company an excuse to take their foot off the gas."

"Sowing the Seeds of Love" debuted at No. 9 on the UK singles chart on the week dated 2 September 1989. Two weeks later, it peaked at number five. The song spent a total of nine weeks in the top 75.

=== Track listings ===
- 7-inch and cassette single
1. "Sowing the Seeds of Love" (7-inch version)
2. "Tears Roll Down"
- UK 12-inch and European CD single
1. "Sowing the Seeds of Love" (full version)
2. "Tears Roll Down"
3. "Shout" (U.S. remix)

The B-side track "Tears Roll Down" is an early, mostly instrumental version of "Laid So Low (Tears Roll Down)", which was released as a single in 1992 and included on the band's greatest hits album of the same name.

== Personnel ==
Tears for Fears

- Roland Orzabal – lead and backing vocals, guitars, electric piano, Fairlight CMI, vocoder
- Curt Smith – co-lead vocals, bass guitar

Additional Personnel

- Ian Stanley – keyboards, Hammond organ
- Chris Hughes – drums
- Luís Jardim – percussion
- Richard Niles – orchestral arrangement

== Charts ==
=== Weekly charts ===
Weekly chart performance
Chart (1989)	Peak position
Australia (ARIA)	13
Austria (Ö3 Austria Top 40)	17
Belgium (Ultratop 50 Flanders)	11
Canada Top Singles (RPM)	1
Canada Retail Singles (RPM)	5
Europe (Eurochart Hot 100 Singles)	10
Finland (Suomen virallinen lista)	19
France (SNEP)	18
Ireland (IRMA)	4
Italy (Musica e dischi)	2
Italy Airplay (Music & Media)	1
Netherlands (Dutch Top 40)	3
Netherlands (Single Top 100)	3
New Zealand (Recorded Music NZ)	4
Spain (AFYVE)	8
Sweden (Sverigetopplistan)	8
Switzerland (Schweizer Hitparade)	11
UK Singles (Official Charts)	5
US Billboard Hot 100	2
US Adult Contemporary (Billboard)	29
US Alternative Airplay (Billboard)	1
US Dance Singles Sales (Billboard)	41
US Mainstream Rock Airplay (Billboard)	4
US Cash Box Top 100	1
West Germany (GfK)	11

=== Year-end charts ===
Year-end chart performance for "Sowing the Seeds of Love"
Chart (1989)	Position
Australia (ARIA)	91
Belgium (Ultratop 50 Flanders)	63
Canada Top Singles (RPM)	4
Europe (Eurochart Hot 100 Singles)	39
Netherlands (Dutch Top 40)	31
Netherlands (Single Top 100)	39
UK Singles (Gallup)	76
US Billboard Hot 100	58
US Album Rock Tracks (Billboard)	49
US Modern Rock Tracks (Billboard)	30
US Cash Box Top 100	26

== Certifications ==
Certifications for "Sowing the Seeds of Love"
Region	Certification	Certified units/sales
United Kingdom (BPI)	Silver	200,000^{‡}
^{‡} Sales+streaming figures based on certification alone.

== See also ==
- List of RPM number-one singles of 1989
- List of Billboard number-one alternative singles of the 1980s
