= Gold (Tears for Fears album) =

2006 compilation album by Tears for Fears

Greatest hits album by Tears for Fears
- Released: 8 August 2006
- Genre: Alternative rock; new wave; synth-pop
- Length: 1:53:01
- Label: Hip-O/Mercury
- Producer: Alan Griffiths; Chris Hughes

Tears for Fears chronology
Secret World Live in Paris (2006)	Gold (2006)	Ready Boy & Girls? (2014)

Gold is a greatest hits album by the English rock band Tears for Fears. It was released by Hip-O Records/Mercury Records on 8 August 2006. It covers releases by the band between 1983 and 2005.

== Reception ==
Professional ratings
Review scores
Source	Rating
AllMusic	4.5/5 stars

James Christopher Monger at AllMusic states "Gold successfully brings their whole surprisingly weighty career into focus" and "With the exception of the impossibly fun -- and more than a little "Beatlesque" -- title cut, all of the album's best songs are featured, making this compilation essential for anybody who wonders what happened after 1990."

PopMatters' Mike Schiller says "this unimaginatively assembled, yet adequately comprehensive, two disc compilation becomes the best summary of the band’s career yet released." He also comments that "offerings from The Hurting, Songs From the Big Chair, and The Seeds of Love comprising the first disc, and Elemental, Raoul and the Kings of Spain (both basically solo discs for lead vocalist Roland Orzabal), and 2004 reunion disc Everybody Loves a Happy Ending making up the second."

Mike Duqette at The Second Disc states "this generic compilation is the most comprehensive, covering even the Raoul album, and has a few bonus cuts (the hard-to-find "Floating Down the River" and a new live version of "Mad World"). He goes on to comment that this album was "originally intended to be a career-spanning box, including a bunch of rarities that had missed inclusion on the previous remasters. The usual record company shuffling of feet ensued, and this set was quietly dumped into stores."

== Track listing ==
Disc one
No.	Title	Album	Length
1.	"Mad World"	The Hurting (1983)	3:32
2.	"Pale Shelter"	1982 single, later appeared on The Hurting	4:26
3.	"Change"	The Hurting	4:13
4.	"The Way You Are"	1983 single	4:55
5.	"Shout"	Songs from the Big Chair (1985)	6:31
6.	"Everybody Wants to Rule the World"	Songs from the Big Chair	4:12
7.	"Mothers Talk (U.S. Remix)"	Songs from the Big Chair	4:13
8.	"Head over Heels"	Songs from the Big Chair	4:15
9.	"Woman in Chains"	The Seeds of Love (1989)	6:30
10.	"Sowing the Seeds of Love"	The Seeds of Love	6:17
11.	"Advice for the Young at Heart"	The Seeds of Love	4:50
12.	"Laid So Low (Tears Roll Down)"	Tears Roll Down (Greatest Hits 82–92) (1992)	4:41
Total length:			58:35

Disc two
No.	Title	Album	Length
1.	"Elemental"	Elemental (1993)	3:49
2.	"Cold"	Elemental	5:04
3.	"Break It Down Again"	Elemental	4:31
4.	"New Star"	"Cold" single (1993)	4:26
5.	"Raoul and the Kings of Spain"	Raoul and the Kings of Spain (1995)	5:16
6.	"God's Mistake"	Raoul and the Kings of Spain	3:48
7.	"Closest Thing to Heaven"	Everybody Loves a Happy Ending (2004)	3:36
8.	"Who Killed Tangerine?"	Everybody Loves a Happy Ending	5:32
9.	"Call Me Mellow"	Everybody Loves a Happy Ending	3:37
10.	"Secret World"	Everybody Loves a Happy Ending	5:05
11.	"Floating Down the River (Once Again)"	Secret World Live in Paris (2006)	3:55
12.	"Mad World (Live)"	Previously unreleased	5:43
Total length:			54:21

== Personnel ==
According to MusicBrainz:

- Curt Smith – bass, lead vocals, keyboard
- Roland Orzabal – guitar, keyboard, lead and backing vocals
- Ian Stanley – keyboard
- Manny Elias – drums, percussion
- Chris Hughes – drums, percussion

Additional personnel

- Phil Collins – membranophone
- Nicky Holland – additional vocals, piano
- Neil Taylor – guitar solo
- Oleta Adams – guest lead vocals

== Charts ==
Chart performance for Gold
Chart (2024)	Peak position
Greek Albums (IFPI)	28

== Gold: The Videos ==
Gold: The Videos

Video by Tears for Fears
- Released: 2007
- Genre: Rock; synth-pop
- Length: approximately 72 minutes
- Label: Universal Music Group

Tears for Fears chronology
Classic Tears for Fears: The Universal Masters DVD Collection (2007)	Gold: The Videos (2007)

A video compilation was released in 2007 and included 15 videos spanning the band's first four albums.
