= In My Mind's Eye =

Video by Tears for Fears
- Released: 12 October 1984
- Recorded: 14–15 December 1983
- Length: 60 minutes
- Label: Phonogram; PolyGram Music Video
- Director: Mike Mansfield

Tears for Fears chronology
The Videosingles (1983)	In My Mind's Eye (1984)	Scenes from the Big Chair (1985)

In My Mind's Eye is a concert performance video released by the English new wave band Tears for Fears. It was recorded in December 1983 at the London Hammersmith Odeon (now the Hammersmith Apollo), and released on home video in October 1984.

The band had been touring the UK and internationally throughout much of 1983, promoting their debut album The Hurting which went to No. 1 in the UK and contained three UK Top 5 hit singles. In November 1983, they released a brand new single, "The Way You Are", and finished a successful year with another UK tour to promote it. The band also performed most of the tracks from The Hurting as well as the instrumental B-side to "The Way You Are" entitled "The Marauders". Ironically, "The Way You Are" and "The Marauders" were not featured on the video release, despite being the primary reason for the tour itself. The band also performed three brand new songs never before heard, "The Working Hour", "Mothers Talk", and "Head over Heels" (the latter of which was segued with the song "We Are Broken" which had already been released as the B-side of their hit "Pale Shelter" earlier that year). Both "Mothers Talk" and "Head over Heels" would be hits for the band in 1984 and 1985 respectively, and all three songs were featured on their multi-platinum second album, Songs from the Big Chair, in 1985. Additionally, the (uncredited) reprise of "Broken" at the end of "Head Over Heels" on this recording was re-used on Songs from the Big Chair.

The In My Mind's Eye concert performance was also shown on television in the UK in March 1985 as part of Channel 4's music show Mirror Image. The televised version featured a reduced track list, but included an interview with the band from 1984 as they were working on their album Songs From The Big Chair.

The concert video itself was directed by Mike Mansfield and was intercut with a variety of visual effects, typical of early 1980s pop videos. Upon its release, band members Curt Smith and Roland Orzabal stated that although they were happy with the video release in general, they were less enthused about the visual effects added to it.

Originally released on video cassette and laserdisc, In My Mind's Eye was released on DVD as part of the 30th anniversary 4-disc deluxe box set of The Hurting in October 2013.

== Personnel ==
- Roland Orzabal (guitar, vocals, keyboards on "The Prisoner", "Mad World", "Change")
- Curt Smith (bass, vocals)
- Ian Stanley (keyboards)
- Manny Elias (drums)
- Jerry Marotta (percussion)
- Andy Davis (keyboards)
- Neil Taylor (guitar)

== Track listing ==
- "Start of the Breakdown"
- "Mothers Talk"
- "Pale Shelter"
- "The Working Hour"
- "The Prisoner"
- "Ideas as Opiates"
- "Mad World"
- "We Are Broken"
- "Head over Heels"
- "We Are Broken" (Reprise)
- "Suffer the Children"
- "The Hurting"
- "Memories Fade"
- "Change"

Music producer: Ross Cullum.
