= Secret World Live in Paris =

Live album by Tears for Fears
- Released: 27 February 2006
- Recorded: 18 June 2005
- Venue: Parc des Princes (Paris)
- Genre: Pop rock
- Length: 57:05
- Label: XIII Bis

Tears for Fears chronology
Everybody Loves a Happy Ending (2004)	Secret World Live in Paris (2006)	Gold (2006)

Secret World – Live in Paris is a live album by the English pop rock band Tears for Fears released in 2006.

The band's first official live album, it was recorded at the Parc des Princes stadium in Paris, France, during their 2005 world tour. The two-disc release contains a CD album along with a DVD video of the performance. It was released on 27 February 2006 by the French record label XIII Bis.

The CD also contains three additional studio tracks; the previously unreleased "Floating Down the River", a radio edit of "Secret World" (released as a promo single in France, taken from the band's sixth album Everybody Loves a Happy Ending) and "What Are We Fighting For?", a song written and originally included on Curt Smith's 1998 album Mayfield.

== Track listing ==
No.	Title	Writer(s)	Length
1.	"Secret World"	Orzabal	4:54
2.	"Call Me Mellow"	Orzabal, Smith, Pettus	3:45
3.	"Sowing the Seeds of Love"	Orzabal, Smith	6:51
4.	"Pale Shelter"	Orzabal	4:43
5.	"Closest Thing to Heaven"	Orzabal, Smith, Pettus	4:08
6.	"Mad World"	Orzabal	5:14
7.	"Everybody Wants to Rule the World"	Orzabal, Stanley, Hughes	4:27
8.	"Head over Heels"	Orzabal, Smith	4:12
9.	"Shout"	Orzabal, Stanley	6:32
10.	"Secret World (radio edit; bonus studio track)"	Orzabal	3:37
11.	"Floating Down the River (previously unreleased; bonus studio track)"	Orzabal	3:56
12.	"What Are We Fighting For (previously released on Curt Smith's 1998 Mayfield album; bonus studio track)"	Smith, Pettus	4:46

Tracks 1–9 recorded in Paris, 18 June 2005. Tracks 10–12 are studio recordings.

=== DVD listing ===
1. "Secret World" (Orzabal)
2. "Call Me Mellow" (Orzabal, Pettus, Smith)
3. "Sowing the Seeds of Love" (Orzabal, Smith)
4. "Pale Shelter" (Orzabal, Smith)
5. "Closest Thing to Heaven" (Orzabal, Pettus, Smith)
6. "Mad World" (Orzabal)
7. "Everybody Wants to Rule the World" (Hughes, Orzabal, Stanley)
8. "Head Over Heels" (Orzabal, Smith)
9. "Shout" (Orzabal, Stanley)

== Personnel ==
Tears for Fears

- Roland Orzabal – lead vocals (1–3, 5, 8, 9), rhythm guitar, additional lead guitar, backing vocals
- Curt Smith – lead vocals (4, 6, 7), bass guitar, backing vocals
- Doug Petty – keyboards
- Charlton Pettus – lead guitar
- Nick D'Virgilio – drums

Studio track credits

- Roland Orzabal – vocals, instruments, guitars (11)
- Curt Smith – vocals, instruments
- Charlton Pettus – instruments, guitars, backing vocals
- Fred Eltringham – drums (10)
- Nick D'Virgilio – drums (11)
- Shawn Pelton – drums (12)
- Joel Peskin – baritone saxophone (10), tenor saxophone (10)
- Steve Kujaja – flute (10)
- Gary Grant – trumpet (10), flugelhorn (10)
- David Washburn – trumpet (10), flugelhorn (10)

Orchestra on "Secret World"

- Paul Buckmaster – arrangements and conductor
- Suzie Katayama – contractor
- Stefanie Fife, Barry Gold, Maurice Grants, Vahe Hayrikyan, Suzie Katayama, Miguel Martinez, Dan Smith and Rudy Stein – cello
- Gayle Levant – harp
- Bob Becker, Denyse Buffman, Roland Kato, Carole Mukogawa, Karie Prescott and Evan Wilson – viola
- Charlie Bisharat, Eve Butler, Mario DeLeon, Joel Derouin, Julian Hallmark, Armen Garabedian, Berj Garabedian, Norm Hughes, Peter Kent, Michael Markman, Robert Matsuda, Sid Page, Sandra Park, Sara Parkins, Bob Peterson, Lesa Terry, Josefina Veraga and John Wittenberg – violin
