= The Videosingles =

Video by Tears for Fears
- Released: May 1983
- Recorded: 1982–1983
- Length: 14 minutes
- Label: Phonogram; PolyGram Music Video
- Director: Clive Richardson; Steve Barron
- Producer: Tony Hazell; Siobhan Barron

Tears for Fears chronology
The Videosingles (1983)	In My Mind's Eye (1984)

The Videosingles is a home video music compilation by the English new wave band Tears for Fears. Released in May 1983, it features the promotional music videos for the three UK Top 5 hit singles from the band's debut studio album, The Hurting (1983).

== Track listing ==
- "Mad World" (directed by Clive Richardson)
- "Change" (directed by Clive Richardson)
- "Pale Shelter" (directed by Steve Barron)
- (additional music: "Start of the Breakdown", with a gallery of still images from the band's 1983 concert tour)

All music produced by Chris Hughes and Ross Cullum.
