= Secret World =

Secret world or Secret World may refer to:

== Music ==
- "Secret World", a song by Peter Gabriel from his 1992 album Us
  - Secret World Tour, a 1993–1994 world tour by Peter Gabriel
  - Secret World Live, a 1994 album of Peter Gabriel's 1993 Secret World Tour
  - Secret World Live (film), a 1994 DVD of Peter Gabriel's 1993 Secret World Tour
- "Secret World", a song by Tears for Fears from their 2004 album Everybody Loves a Happy Ending
  - Secret World Live in Paris, a 2006 album by Tears for Fears from their 2005 world tour

== Other ==
- Secret World (film), a 1969 French film starring Jacqueline Bisset
- Secret World wildlife rescue, a rescue centre in England
- The Secret World (radio series), a BBC comedy
- The Secret World, a 2012 multiplayer online video game
- Xplora1: Peter Gabriel's Secret World, a 1993 computer game
- Shiva: The Secret World of Vedas City, a 2017 Indian animated TV film based on the animated show Shiva
