= Suffer the Children =

Suffer the Children may refer to:

- Suffer the Children (novel), a 1977 horror novel by John Saul
- "Suffer the Children" (song), a 1981 single by Tears for Fears
- "Suffer the Children", song by Napalm Death from the 1990 album Harmony Corruption
- A Nightmare on Elm Street: Suffer the Children, a 2005 novel by David Bishop
- "Suffer the Children" (The 4400), a 2005 television episode

== See also ==
- Suffer Little Children
- Suffer the Little Children (disambiguation)
