= Tomcats Screaming Outside =

Studio album by Roland Orzabal
- Released: 26 March 2001 (Germany and France); 2 April 2001 (UK); 11 September 2001 (US)
- Recorded: 1998–2000
- Studio: Neptune's Kitchen (England)
- Genres: Alternative rock; pop rock; electronica; drum and bass; ambient techno; trip hop; downtempo
- Length: 54:35
- Labels: Eagle; Gold Circle
- Producers: Roland Orzabal; Alan Griffiths

Singles from Tomcats Screaming Outside
- 1. "Low Life" Released: 10 April 2001

Professional ratings
Review scores
Source	Rating
AllMusic	4/5 stars

Tomcats Screaming Outside is the debut solo studio album by the English musician Roland Orzabal. It was released on 2 April 2001. Although Orzabal had effectively made two solo albums under the Tears for Fears moniker in the 1990s; Elemental (1993) and Raoul and the Kings of Spain (1995), following the departure of bandmate Curt Smith, this was the first recording to be released under his own name. Though originally intended to be released as a Tears for Fears album, Orzabal had reunited with Smith in 2000 which prompted him to release the then-completed Tomcats album under his own name shortly afterwards.

== Background ==
In a 2000 interview, Orzabal commented on his influences for the album: "I started out with an absolute concrete vision of where I wanted to go so I started with a very different rhythm approach, with drum and bass/jungle...and I ended up with something that wasn't the original plan."

This album was Orzabal's last to feature contributions from Alan Griffiths, who co-wrote most of the tracks on this album as well as the previous two Tears for Fears albums. The album was given a low-key release and did not chart, but earned some critical acclaim for its clever melding of pop songwriting and drum and bass, ambient techno and trip hop textures. Dan Gennoe claimed in Amazon.com's editorial review: "Solo album or not, Tomcats Screaming Outside is the best Tears for Fears album in a decade."

Two outtake demos from the album's sessions, "Deep Seeded Blindness" and "Cold Planet", have been made available online.

The US release of the album (on Gold Circle Records) had the unfortunate coincidence to be released on 11 September 2001, the same day the United States experienced its worst-ever terrorist attack, and drew little notice outside Tears for Fears' core fan base.

== Track listing ==
All songs written by Roland Orzabal/Alan Griffiths, except where noted.

No.	Title	Writer(s)	Length
1.	"Ticket to the World"		5:48
2.	"Low Life"	Orzabal	4:36
3.	"Hypnoculture"	Orzabal	3:13
4.	"Bullets for Brains"		4:08
5.	"For the Love of Cain"	Orzabal	4:06
6.	"Under Ether"		5:51
7.	"Day by Day by Day by Day by Day"		4:35
8.	"Dandelion"		3:03
9.	"Hey Andy!"	Orzabal	4:25
10.	"Kill Love"		5:40
11.	"Snowdrop"		4:23
12.	"Maybe Our Days Are Numbered"		4:47

== Singles ==
"Low Life" was the first single from the album. Plans to release the single in the UK were scrapped at the last minute, although it did see a commercial release in mainland Europe. "Low Life" was also played in the US on adult alternative radio. "For the Love of Cain" was planned as the second single release from the album, but it was cancelled since the first single had no chart success in Germany. Only a limited number of copies were sold through Orzabal's official website.

- "Low Life" (12 March 2001)

1. "Low Life" (album version) – 4:37
2. "Low Life" (Supersub mix) – 4:58
3. "Low Life" (President Who? mix) – 4:50
4. "Low Life" (radio edit) – 4:07

- "For the Love of Cain" (August 2001)

1. "For the Love of Cain" (radio edit) – 3:33
2. "Day by Day by Day by Day by Day" (album version) – 4:35
3. "Low Life" (album version) – 4:37
4. "Low Life" (video) – 4:35

== Personnel ==
- Roland Orzabal – vocals, keyboards, programming, guitars
- Alan Griffiths – keyboards, programming, guitars
- David Sutton – bass
- Nick D'Virgilio – drums

Production

- Roland Orzabal – producer
- Alan Griffiths – producer
- Mark O'Donoughue – engineer, mixing
- Guy Davie – mastering at the Exchange (London, UK)
- Cürt Evans – design
- Daragh McDonagh – photography
- John Amison – management
