= Suffer the Little Children (disambiguation) =

Suffer the Little Children may refer to:

- The Little Children, a saying of Jesus
- Suffer the Little Children (novel), a novel by Donna Leon
- "Suffer the Little Children", a short story by Stephen King
- Suffer The Little Children, a book by Mary Raftery and Eoin O'Sullivan
- Suffer Little Children, a Sister Fidelma mystery by Peter Tremayne
- "Suffer Little Children", a song by The Smiths
- "Suffer the Children", a song by Tears for Fears
- Suffer the Little Children, a song by Pat Benatar from her 1988 album Wide Awake In Dreamland
- Suffer Little Children (film), a 1983 film
- "Suffer Little Children" (Cardiac Arrest), a 1996 television episode
- "Suffer the Little Children" (Deadwood), a 2004 television episode
- "Suffer Little Children" (Lady Killers), a 1980 television episode

== See also ==
- Suffer the Children (disambiguation)
