= The Hurting =

- Standard cover art, originally used for the "Suffer the Children" single

Studio album by Tears for Fears
- Released: 11 March 1983
- Recorded: 1981–1983
- Studios: Brittania Row, London; Crescent, Bath (mixing); AIR, London (mixing)
- Genres: New wave; synth-pop; dark wave; gothic rock; post-punk
- Length: 41:39
- Labels: Mercury; Phonogram
- Producers: Chris Hughes; Ross Cullum

Tears for Fears chronology
The Hurting (1983)	Songs from the Big Chair (1985)

International cover art
- Cover art for earlier international editions, originally used for the "Mad World" single

Singles from The Hurting
- 1. "Mad World" Released: 10 September 1982; 2. "Change" Released: 28 January 1983; 3. "Pale Shelter" Released: 22 April 1983

The Hurting is the debut studio album by the English pop rock band Tears for Fears, released on 11 March 1983 by Mercury Records, and distributed by Phonogram Inc. The album peaked at No. 1 on the UK Albums Chart in its second week of release and was certified Gold by the BPI within three weeks of release. The album also entered the Top 40 in several other countries, including Canada, Germany, and Australia. It was certified Platinum in the UK in January 1985.

The Hurting is a loose concept album focusing on themes of child abuse, psychological trauma, and depression. Despite its dark subject matter, the album was a huge commercial success. It contains Tears for Fears' first three hit singles – "Mad World", "Change", and "Pale Shelter" – all of which reached the top five in the UK and the Top 40 internationally. It also contains a new version of the band's first single, "Suffer the Children", which had originally been released in 1981, while the album version of "Pale Shelter" is also a new recording. The album initially received mixed reviews but attracted retrospective critical acclaim.

== Writing and recording ==
After their band Graduate broke up in 1981, Roland Orzabal and Curt Smith formed a band with the name History of Headaches. Both took an interest in the work of the American psychologist, psychotherapist, and writer Arthur Janov and renamed the band Tears for Fears after a phrase from his 1980 book Prisoners of Pain.

The songs were written by Orzabal inspired by his own childhood traumas and the primal theories of Janov. Most of the songs were heavily inspired by the writings of Janov. "Ideas as Opiates" was named after a chapter in Prisoners of Pain, which also was a direct influence on the song "The Prisoner". Musical influences included Gary Numan, Talking Heads, Peter Gabriel, Joy Division, and OMD.

Having worked with different producers on their first two singles, they recruited Chris Hughes to produce the album. The core of the band Orzabal and Smith worked in a close and democratic collaboration with producers Hughes and Ross Cullum, only using ideas all four of them agreed on. Prior to the album "Mad World", originally thought of as a single B-side, was released and became a hit single. The band's first two singles "Suffer the Children" and "Pale Shelter" were re-recorded for the album.

== Critical reception ==
Professional ratings
Review scores
Source	Rating
AllMusic	4.5/5 stars
Mojo	4/5 stars
PopMatters	8/10
Q	4/5 stars
Record Collector	4/5 stars
Record Mirror	4/5 stars
Rolling Stone	3/5 stars
Smash Hits	8/10
Sounds	5/5 stars
Uncut	8/10

=== Contemporary ===
Contemporary reviews of The Hurting were mixed. Sounds critic Johnny Waller raved that "Tears for Fears bring a sense of purpose and a feeling of passion to glossy pop", finding that with its balance of "intensely personal" lyrics and "sharp", pop-oriented music, the album avoids "descending into a trough of self-depressive negativity." In Smash Hits, Fred Dellar wrote that "there's no doubting the talent on display", while in Record Mirror, Jim Reid said that "The Hurting does much to further Tears for Fears' standing as one of the few groups who are approaching synth-pop with a degree of wit and intelligence."

Melody Maker's Steve Sutherland felt that "Tears for Fears's pop primal therapy tends to luxuriate in the attention it attracts, sounds ironically happy to wallow inspirationally instead of seeking exorcism". However, he observed that "the Tears for Fears formula – to translate childhood traumas into adult romance with Freudian fanaticism – is ludicrously laboured but, crucially, their lyrical lethargy is salvaged by what really sells them; their structural invention ... sensibly, their suffering's usually controlled to sound smooth", and that this was the strength of the record: "The success of The Hurting lies in its lack of friction, in its safety and, for all their claims that coping with relationships has been warped beyond their ken, Tears for Fears have contrived an assured masterpiece of seduction".

In a negative review for NME, Gavin Martin stated that "this record and others like it are a terrible, useless sort of art that makes self pity and futility a commercial proposition", and that "TFF and their listeners sound like they've given up completely, retreating from the practical world into a fantasy." He described the album's music as "just the sort of doom laden dross you'd expect from the lyrics: rehashed and reheated hollow doom with a bit of Ultravox here, diluted Joy Division poured everywhere, and the title track sounding suspiciously like one of the old pompous outfits with a welter of mellotrons – Barclay James Harvest per chance?"

In the US, David Fricke of Rolling Stone said that "Tears for Fears stand out among the current crop of identikit synth-pop groups by virtue of their resourceful, stylish songwriting and fetching rhythmic sway. Granted, the adolescent angst and bleak, pained romanticism ... sometimes come off as an adequate imitation of Joy Division, at best. But for every lapse into sackcloth-and-ashes anguish on The Hurting ... there is a heady, danceable pop tune like 'Change' ... Tears for Fears may be too concerned with their own petty traumas, but it is a testimony to their refined pop instincts that they manage to produce this much pleasure from the pain."

=== Retrospective ===
Retrospective reviews regarded the album more highly. Reviewing the 1999 reissue for Q, Andrew Collins wrote, "Despite its occasional bum note, The Hurting remains a landmark work ... a highly emotional pop record, at its simplest". Bruce Eder of AllMusic attributed the album's success to "its makers' ability to package an unpleasant subject – the psychologically wretched family histories of Roland Orzabal and Curt Smith – in an attractive and sellable musical format", and found that "the work is sometimes uncomfortably personal, but musically compelling enough to bring it back across the decades."

For the 30th anniversary edition in 2013, Danny Eccleston of Mojo pondered, "Has there ever been a more thoroughly miserable mainstream pop album than The Hurting? ... Even when it is uptempo it is sombre, and at its most musically adventurous, in the cavernous minimalism of 'Ideas as Opiates' and gnarly dissonances of 'The Prisoner', it's almost unbearably bereft ... But in essence, it was pop." Tom Byford summarised the album in Record Collector as "a surfeit of complex ideas reflecting troubled upbringings married with immediate, infectious, hummable tunes." In Uncut, Wyndham Wallace said it was "a remarkable debut album for a band still in their early twenties", finding them grappling with "their unhappy childhoods in the context of sophisticated synth pop while the genre was still in its infancy."

John Bergstrom of PopMatters felt that "at times, the unflinching approach works to the album's detriment, as Orzabal's songwriting skirts cliché and the obtuse, teenage poetry that some critics seized on at the time of The Hurting's release ... But part of the brilliance of Hurting is that such histrionic moments are so seldom. Rather, time after time ... the words connect at gut level and in sincere fashion." Calling the record "simply one of the strongest, most fully-realized albums of the early-to-mid-1980s", Bergstrom noted its influence on later acts such as Trent Reznor, the Smashing Pumpkins, and Arcade Fire, and concluded, "The albums that prove to be special, influential, and groundbreaking in their own time, and then in subsequent eras as well, are far and few between. Thirty years on, there is little doubt where The Hurting stands."

At least three of the songs from The Hurting were sampled by some of the most mainstream hip-hop and R&B artists. "Memories Fade" was reworked by Kanye West on his album 808s & Heartbreak (2008) into "Coldest Winter". "Ideas as Opiates" was sampled by Drake on the song "Lust for Life", from his third mixtape So Far Gone (2009). "Pale Shelter" was sampled by the Weeknd on the song "Secrets" on his album Starboy (2016).

"Mad World" was covered by Michael Andrews and Gary Jules for the soundtrack to the 2001 film Donnie Darko and later released as a single, topping the UK Singles Chart.

== Reissues ==
The album was remastered and reissued in 1999, and included four remixes as bonus tracks and an extensive booklet with liner notes about the album's creation.

A 30th anniversary reissue was released on 21 October 2013, in both double-CD and deluxe four-disc boxed set editions. Double CD comprised the original album and a CD of b-sides. The 4-disc box set featured additional CD of live sessions and a DVD, a book containing interviews, a new essay from Paul Sinclair about the album, a replica of a 1983 tour programme, a discography and photos. The first 500 pre-orders from the Universal Music online store also included a vinyl 7" single of "Change" in a rare earlier picture sleeve.

A Blu-ray Audio disc in the High Fidelity Pure Audio series was released in 2014 without any bonus tracks.

For the 40th anniversary of The Hurting, two editions were released, both featuring a new remaster of the original album by Miles Showell. One is a half-speed vinyl edition, the other a Blu-ray Audio disc in Paul Sinclair's SDE Surround Series, featuring the album in several formats (the aforementioned remaster; new stereo, 5.1 surround and Dolby Atmos remixes by Steven Wilson and an instrumental mix of the entire album) plus two newly discovered recordings from the aborted sessions with Mike Howlett: early versions of "Mad World" and "Watch Me Bleed".

== Track listing ==
All songs written by Roland Orzabal, except where indicated.

=== Original release ===
Side one
No.	Title	Lead vocals	Length
1.	"The Hurting"	Orzabal; Curt Smith	4:20
2.	"Mad World"	Smith	3:35
3.	"Pale Shelter"	Smith	4:34
4.	"Ideas as Opiates"	Orzabal	3:46
5.	"Memories Fade"	Orzabal	5:08

Side two
No.	Title	Lead vocals	Length
6.	"Suffer the Children"	Orzabal	3:53
7.	"Watch Me Bleed"	Orzabal	4:18
8.	"Change"	Smith	4:15
9.	"The Prisoner"	Smith	2:55
10.	"Start of the Breakdown"	Orzabal	5:00

Cassette only bonus track
No.	Title	Length
11.	"Change" (New Version)	4:36

1999 remaster CD bonus tracks
No.	Title	Length
11.	"Pale Shelter" (Long Version†)	7:09
12.	"The Way You Are (Orzabal, Curt Smith, Ian Stanley, Manny Elias)" (Extended††)	7:43
13.	"Mad World" (World Remix)	3:42
14.	"Change" (Extended Version)	6:00

Notes

- † – The 1999 remastered version of the album incorrectly credits Curt Smith as co-writer and Mike Howlett as producer of "Pale Shelter" (Long Version). As confirmed on the original releases, Smith did not write any of the tracks for The Hurting and this version of "Pale Shelter" is actually the 1983 12" extended version of the song, which was produced by Chris Hughes and Ross Cullum. Howlett produced the original 1982 version.
- †† – "The Way You Are" was originally a non-album track, although the 12" version was included on the remastered version of The Hurting in 1999.

=== 30th anniversary edition bonus discs ===
Disc two – Singles & B-Sides
No.	Title	Length
1.	"Suffer the Children" (Original Version)	3:45
2.	"Pale Shelter" (Original Version)	4:04
3.	"The Prisoner" (Original 7" Version)	2:43
4.	"Ideas as Opiates" (Alternate Version†)	3:53
5.	"Change" (New Version)	4:36
6.	"Suffer the Children" (Remix)	4:15
7.	"Pale Shelter" (Long Version)	7:09
8.	"Mad World" (World Remix)	3:39
9.	"Change" (Extended Version)	5:59
10.	"Pale Shelter" (New Extended Version)	6:44
11.	"Suffer the Children" (Instrumental)	4:26
12.	"Change" (Radio Edit)	3:58
13.	"Wino"	2:23
14.	"The Conflict"	4:02
15.	"We Are Broken††"	4:03
16.	"Suffer the Children" (Demo)	4:04

Notes

- † – Track 4, labeled as "Ideas as Opiates (Alternate Version)", was intended to be the first version of the song (originally released as the B-side to "Mad World") but was mistakenly replaced by a previously unreleased version of the album track.
- †† – Track 15, although labeled as "We Are Broken", it was intended to be the version found as the B-side to "Pale Shelter", however it was accidentally replaced with the audio track of "Broken Revisited" which is a slightly extended version of the original track and was first included as a bonus track on the limited edition cassette of Songs from the Big Chair in 1985 and later included on the 1999 remastered edition and 2006 deluxe edition of the same album.

Disc three – Radio Sessions & Live
No.	Title	Length
1.	"Ideas as Opiates" (Peel Session 1/9/1982)	3:48
2.	"Suffer the Children" (Peel Session 1/9/1982)	4:03
3.	"The Prisoner" (Peel Session 1/9/1982)	2:50
4.	"The Hurting" (Peel Session 1/9/1982)	3:45
5.	"Memories Fade" (David Jensen BBC Session 20/10/1982)	4:56
6.	"The Prisoner" (David Jensen BBC Session 20/10/1982)	2:49
7.	"Start of the Breakdown" (David Jensen BBC Session 20/10/1982)	4:00
8.	"The Hurting" (David Jensen BBC Session 20/10/1982)	3:50
9.	"Start of the Breakdown" (Live at Oxford Apollo 8/4/1983)	5:56
10.	"Change" (Live at Oxford Apollo 8/4/1983)	4:00

DVD – In My Mind's Eye: Live at Hammersmith Odeon (December 1983)
No.	Title	Length
1.	"Start of the Breakdown"	6:14
2.	"Mothers Talk"	3:50
3.	"Pale Shelter"	4:35
4.	"The Working Hour"	6:29
5.	"The Prisoner"	2:52
6.	"Ideas as Opiates"	3:43
7.	"Mad World"	3:36
8.	"We Are Broken"	2:57
9.	"Head over Heels"	4:49
10.	"Suffer the Children"	4:02
11.	"The Hurting"	4:24
12.	"Memories Fade"	4:51
13.	"Change"	4:10

== Personnel ==
Credits adapted from the album's liner notes.

Tears for Fears

- Roland Orzabal – vocals, guitars, keyboards, rhythm programming
- Curt Smith – vocals, bass, keyboards
- Manny Elias – drums, rhythm programming
- Ian Stanley – keyboard programming, computer programming

Additional personnel

- Chris Hughes – rhythm programming, xylophone, conducting
- Ross Cullum – jazz high, dynamic toggle (percussion)
- Mel Collins – saxophones
- Phil Palmer – Palmer picking (guitar)
- Caroline Orzabal – child vocal on "Suffer the Children"

== Charts ==
=== Weekly charts ===
1983 weekly chart performance for The Hurting
Chart (1983)	Peak position
Australian Albums (Kent Music Report)	15
Canada Top Albums/CDs (RPM)	7
Dutch Albums (Album Top 100)	30
German Albums (Offizielle Top 100)	15
New Zealand Albums (RMNZ)	16
UK Albums (Official Charts)	1
US Billboard 200	73
US Rock Albums (Billboard)	41

Weekly chart performance for The Hurting (30th Anniversary Edition)
Chart (2013)	Peak position
UK Albums (Official Charts)	85

2020 weekly chart performance for The Hurting
Chart (2020)	Peak position
Scottish Albums (Official Charts)	52

=== Year-end charts ===
Year-end chart performance for The Hurting
Chart (1983)	Position
Canada Top Albums/CDs (RPM)	32
German Albums (Offizielle Top 100)	49
UK Albums (Gallup)	19

== Certifications ==
Region	Certification	Certified units/sales
Canada (Music Canada)	Platinum	100,000^{^}
France (SNEP)	Gold	100,000^{*}
United Kingdom (BPI)	Platinum	300,000^{^}
United States (RIAA)	Gold	500,000^{^}
^{*} Sales figures based on certification alone.^{^} Shipments figures based on certification alone.
