= Closest Thing to Heaven =

2005 single by Tears for Fears

Single by Tears for Fears

from the album Everybody Loves a Happy Ending
- Released: 21 February 2005
- Genre: New wave
- Length: 3:36 (album version); 3:22 (UK radio mix)
- Label: New Door; Gut
- Songwriters: Roland Orzabal; Curt Smith; Charlton Pettus
- Producers: Tears for Fears; Charlton Pettus

Tears for Fears singles chronology
"Falling Down" (1996)	"Closest Thing to Heaven" (2005)	"Everybody Loves a Happy Ending" / "Call Me Mellow" (2005)

"Closest Thing to Heaven" is a song by the English pop rock band Tears for Fears. In the UK, it was released as the first single from their sixth studio album, Everybody Loves a Happy Ending (2004) and was the first single to feature both original members, Roland Orzabal and Curt Smith, since 1990.

The song was Tears for Fears' first UK top-40 hit since "Raoul and the Kings of Spain" in 1995, reaching number 40 on the UK Singles Chart. It also reached number 12 in Finland and number 38 in the Netherlands.

== Music video ==
The promo video for "Closest Thing to Heaven" was directed by Michael Palmieri (who has also worked with Foo Fighters and Beck), and is a colourful theatrical fantasy featuring the Hollywood actress Brittany Murphy.

== Track listing ==
CD3: Gut/EU0161836ERE

1. "Closest Thing to Heaven" (UK Radio Mix) – 3:22
2. "Closest Thing to Heaven" (Solasso Dub) – 5:33

CD5: Gut/CDGUT66

1. "Closest Thing to Heaven" (UK Radio Mix) – 3:22
2. "Closest Thing to Heaven" (Brothers in Rhythm Group Therapy Mix) – 8:15
3. "Closest Thing to Heaven" (Solasso Club Mix) – 5:49
4. "Closest Thing to Heaven" (Brothers in Rhythm Group Therapy Dub) – 8:15
5. "Closest Thing to Heaven" (Solasso Dub) – 5:33

== Charts ==
Chart (2005)	Peak position
Belgium (Ultratip Bubbling Under Flanders)	14
Finland (Suomen virallinen lista)	12
Netherlands (Dutch Top 40)	38
Netherlands (Single Top 100)	70
Scottish Singles Sales (Official Charts)	40
UK Singles (Official Charts)	40
UK Indie (Official Charts)	8
