= Janice Whaley =

American singer

Janice Whaley is an American and experimental a cappella singer and songwriter from San Jose, California. Whaley's music is a combination of pop and indie pop. She is most well known for her 2010 multi-album solo work The Smiths Project, consisting of a capella covers of every song by British alt-rock band The Smiths.

== Early life ==
Whaley was born and raised in Joshua Tree, California. Her father was a Baptist minister. She learned to play piano as a child, and was a member of her high school marching, symphonic and jazz bands. After high school, she studied electronic music at San Francisco State University.

== Musical career ==
In 2010, Janice Whaley released The Smiths Project, a reimagining of the entire catalog of Smiths songs. The Smiths Project was meticulously constructed over the course of a year by Whaley on her own, building up each song in 20 or 30 layers of vocals, entirely a capella, taking up to 30 hours per song. Stephen Kelly of British newspaper The Guardian called The Smiths Project a "testament to just how charming, creative and arduous the modern tribute can be", and praised it as a sincere, heartfelt reinterpretation of the original Smiths catalog, saying that her "greatest achievement has been to highlight and detach the art from the artist." Music journalist Sam Taylor also praised Whaley's cover of "How Soon Is Now?" as "one of the song's more successful heirs", saying that Whaley's "a cappella harmonies capture the original's eeriness."

== Discography ==
=== Albums ===
- The Smiths Project (2011), album series and box set including:
  - The Smiths
  - Hatful of Hollow
  - Meat is Murder
  - The Queen is Dead
  - Louder than Bombs
  - Strangeways, Here We Come
- Patchwork Life (2012)

=== Stand-alone cover versions and collaborations ===
- "Trees" (2011): re-recording of track from the Curt Smith (Tears For Fears) album Mayfield.
- "Ideas as Opiates" (2012): duet with actor James Roday, original version by Tears For Fears.
- "We Need You" (2012): cover version of Duran Duran original, as requested by Simon Le Bon.

Year	Organisation	Nominated work	Award	Result
2011	SF Bay Guardian	The Smiths Project	"Best of the Bay"	Won
2011	SF Weekly	The Smiths Project	"Best of San Francisco"	Won
2013	Artist in Music Awards	n/a	Best Singer/Songwriter	Nominated
2013	Artist in Music Awards	n/a	Best Adult Contemporary Artist	Nominated
2013	Independent Music Awards	The Smiths Project	Best Tribute Album	Nominated
2013	Contemporary A Cappella Recording Awards	Patchwork Life	Best Pop/Rock Album	Nominated
2013	Contemporary A Cappella Recording Awards	"Tunnel Vision"	Best Electronic/Experimental Song	Nominated
2013	Contemporary A Cappella Recording Awards	"Tunnel Vision"	Best Professional Original Song	Nominated
2013	Contemporary A Cappella Recording Awards	"Tunnel Vision"	Best Song By A Solo Performer	Nominated
