= Everybody Loves a Happy Ending / Call Me Mellow =

"Everybody Loves a Happy Ending" / "Call Me Mellow"

Single by Tears for Fears

from the album Everybody Loves a Happy Ending
- Released: 13 June 2005
- Genre: New wave; pop rock
- Length: 4:21 ("Everybody Loves a Happy Ending"); 3:39 ("Call Me Mellow")
- Label: New Door; Gut
- Songwriters: Roland Orzabal; Curt Smith; Charlton Pettus
- Producers: Tears for Fears; Charlton Pettus

Tears for Fears singles chronology
"Closest Thing to Heaven" (2005)	"Everybody Loves a Happy Ending" / "Call Me Mellow" (2005)	"Secret World" (2006)

"Everybody Loves a Happy Ending" / "Call Me Mellow" are songs by the English pop rock band Tears for Fears, released as a double A-side single from their album Everybody Loves a Happy Ending (2004).

The single peaked at number 45 on the Italian Singles Chart.

== Track listing ==
=== Promotional CD5: Gut/PRCDGUT70 ===
1. "Call Me Mellow" (Simon Thornton Radio Edit) – 3:11
2. "Call Me Mellow" (Steve Fitzmaurice Radio Edit) – 2:36
3. "Call Me Mellow" (Dead Stereo Radio Edit) – 3:34
4. "Everybody Loves a Happy Ending" (Steve Fitzmaurice Mix) – 2:34

=== Promotional CD5: Gut/PRCDGUT70Y ===
1. "Call Me Mellow" (MaUVe Club Mix) – 7:00
2. "Call Me Mellow" (Tin Tin Out Coney Island Dub) – 7:19
3. "Call Me Mellow" (Tin Tin Out Coney Island Club Mix) – 7:48
4. "Call Me Mellow" (MaUVe Dub) – 6:48

=== Commercial CD5: Gut/CDGUT70 ===
1. "Everybody Loves a Happy Ending" (Steve Fitzmaurice Mix) – 2:33
2. "Call Me Mellow" (Album Version) – 3:37
3. "Call Me Mellow" (Tin Tin Out Coney Island Club Mix) – 7:48

=== Commercial 12″: Gut/12GUT70 ===
1. "Call Me Mellow" (Tin Tin Out Coney Island Club Mix) – 7:48
2. "Everybody Loves a Happy Ending" (Steve Fitzmaurice Mix) – 2:33
3. "Call Me Mellow" (Mauve Club Mix) – 6:58

== Charts ==
Chart (2005)	Peak position
Italy (FIMI) "Call Me Mellow"	45
UK Singles (OCC)	102
UK Physical Singles (OCC)	79
UK Indie (Official Charts)	13
