= Head over Heels (Tears for Fears song) =

1985 single by Tears for Fears

Single by Tears for Fears

from the album Songs from the Big Chair
- B-side: "When in Love with a Blind Man"
- Released: 14 June 1985
- Genre: New wave; progressive pop
- Length: 5:01 (album version); 4:14 (7-inch version); 3:51 (radio edit)
- Label: Phonogram; Mercury
- Songwriters: Roland Orzabal; Curt Smith
- Producer: Chris Hughes

Tears for Fears singles chronology
| "Everybody Wants to Rule the World" (1985) | "Head over Heels" (1985) | "Suffer the Children [second release]" (1985) |

Music video
- "Head over Heels" on YouTube

"Head over Heels" is a song recorded by the English new wave band Tears for Fears for their second studio album Songs from the Big Chair (1985). The song was released by Phonogram Records and Mercury Records, as the album's fourth single on 14 June 1985 in the UK. It was the band's tenth single release in the United Kingdom and eighth top 40 hit in the country, peaking at number 12. In the United States, it was released in September 1985 as the third single from the album and continued the band's run of hits there, peaking at number three on the Billboard Hot 100 chart. In addition to the regular 7" and 12" formats, a 10" single and limited edition four-leaf-clover-shaped picture disc were also issued for the single's release in the UK. The song was also an international success, reaching the top 40 in several countries.

== Composition ==
"Head over Heels" took approximately two years to develop, initially as an integral part of a musical introduction between songs on the album Songs from the Big Chair (much like "Broken," which had been previously released as the B-side to the 1983 single "Pale Shelter", titled as "We Are Broken").

Since both songs shared the same piano and synthesizer motif, "Head over Heels" ended up being performed alongside "Broken" in live concerts. This arrangement resulted in the final track on the Songs from the Big Chair LP, with a studio recording of "Broken" followed by "Head over Heels," and a live recording of "Broken" (titled as "We Are Broken (Reprise)" at the concert that spawned the VHS In My Mind's Eye).

The song is written in the key of G major at a tempo of 95 beats per minute.

== Reception ==
Cash Box called it "another searching lyric and richly evocative melody."

== B-side ==
"When in Love with a Blind Man" is a short song that served as the B-side to the "Head over Heels" single. It features bassist Curt Smith on vocals and features a synthesized shakuhachi flute, a popular musical motif for pop music in the 1980s.

This song predates a track called "The Working Hour" from the Big Chair album. The motif is identical; it's something Ian [Stanley] came up with which I later put melody and lyrics to. It was recorded in the Wool Hall and was the B-side to "Head over Heels".

— Roland Orzabal

== Music video ==
The music video for "Head over Heels", filmed in late May and into June 1985, was the fourth Tears for Fears clip directed by music video producer Nigel Dick. A lighthearted video in comparison to the band's other promos, it is centred on Roland Orzabal's attempts to get the attention of a librarian (Joan Densmore), while a variety of characters (many played by the rest of the band), including a chimpanzee wearing a Red Sox jersey, engage in shenanigans in the library. The final scene shows Orzabal and the librarian as an older married couple. The video was filmed at the Emmanuel College Library in Toronto, Ontario, Canada.

== In popular culture ==
- An edited version of "Head over Heels" is featured in the 2001 film Donnie Darko.
- In the sitcom Everybody Hates Chris (2005–2008), the song is also used at the end of the 8th episode of the 4th season, where the protagonist Chris is surprised by the transformation of the student known as "Big Bird", after rejecting her because of her appearance.

== Covers ==
- Canadian singer/producer Moka Only covered the song on his 2007 album Vermilion
- American punk rock band New Found Glory covered the song on their 2007 album From the Screen to Your Stereo Part II
- American rock band Hoobastank covered the song on their 2018 album Push Pull
- American alternative pop duo Magdalena Bay covered the song on their 2019 EP day/pop
- American indie pop band Japanese Breakfast covered the song on their 2019 album Head Over Heels b/w Essentially
- American rock band Starset covered the song on their 2025 album Silos

== Formats and track listings ==
=== Album version ===
The album version is about a minute longer than the single, due to the inclusion of a short excerpt from the instrumental live track "Broken" as a coda, recorded in December 1983 at the Hammersmith Odeon in London.

The studio version of "Broken" precedes "Head over Heels" on the original album and has a lyrical relationship with it.

=== 7": Mercury / IDEA10 (UK) ===
1. "Head over Heels" (Remix) – 4:14
2. "When in Love with a Blind Man" – 2:22
- Also released as a 10" single (IDEA1010) and as a four-leaf clover shaped picture disc (IDPIC10)

=== 12": Mercury / IDEA1012 (UK) ===
1. "Broken/Head over Heels/Broken" (Preacher Mix) – 7:53
2. "Head over Heels" (Remix) – 4:14
3. "When in Love with a Blind Man" – 2:22

=== CDV: Mercury / 080 062-2 (UK) ===
1. "Head over Heels" (Remix) – 4:14
2. "Sea Song" – 3:52
3. "The Working Hour" – 6:27
4. "Mothers Talk" (U.S. remix) – 4:14
5. "Head over Heels"

== Personnel ==
Personnel are taken from original album credits and the UK CD liner notes.

Tears for Fears

- Roland Orzabal – lead vocals, guitar, keyboards
- Curt Smith – bass guitar, backing vocals
- Manny Elias – drums
- Ian Stanley – keyboards

Additional musicians

- Andy Davis – grand piano
- Marilyn Davis, Annie McCaig, Sandy McLelland – backing vocals

== Charts ==
=== Weekly charts ===
| Chart (1985–1986) | Peak position |
|---|---|
| Australia (Kent Music Report) | 21 |
| Belgium (Ultratop 50 Flanders) | 18 |
| Canada (The Record) | 11 |
| Canada Top Singles (RPM) | 8 |
| France (IFOP) | 53 |
| Germany (GfK) | 55 |
| Ireland (IRMA) | 5 |
| Netherlands (Dutch Top 40 Tipparade) | 12 |
| Netherlands (Single Top 100) | 29 |
| New Zealand (Recorded Music NZ) | 12 |
| UK Singles (Official Charts) | 12 |
| US Billboard Adult Contemporary | 5 |
| US Billboard Hot 100 | 3 |
| US Billboard Hot Dance Music/Maxi-Singles Sales | 49 |
| US Billboard Top Rock Tracks | 7 |
| US Cash Box | 3 |

=== Year-end charts ===
| Chart (1985) | Position |
|---|---|
| Canada Top Singles (RPM) | 81 |
| US Billboard Hot 100 | 60 |
| US Cash Box | 28 |

== Certifications ==
| Region | Certification | Certified units/sales |
|---|---|---|
| Brazil (Pro-Música Brasil) | Gold | 30,000^{‡} |
| New Zealand (RMNZ) | Platinum | 30,000^{‡} |
| United Kingdom (BPI) | Silver | 200,000^{‡} |
^{‡} Sales+streaming figures based on certification alone.
