= Soul on Board =

Studio album by Curt Smith
- Released: 6 September 1993
- Recorded: 1991–1993
- Studio: Various: The Village Recorder (Los Angeles, California); American Recording Co. (North Hollywood, California); Devonshire Sound Studios (Burbank, California); Millbrook Sound Studios (Millbrook, New York); Electric Lady Studios, The Hit Factory, Soundtrack Studios and Skyline Studios (New York City, New York)
- Genre: Pop
- Length: 51:42
- Label: Vertigo; Phonogram
- Producer: Curt Smith; Martin Page; Chris Kimsey; Kevin Deane

Curt Smith chronology
Soul on Board (1993)	Mayfield (1998)

Singles from Soul on Board
- 1. "Calling Out" Released: 26 July 1993; 2. "Words" Released: February 1994

Soul on Board is the debut solo studio album by the English singer Curt Smith, released on 6 September 1993 by Vertigo and Phonogram Records.

The album was Smith's first musical venture after leaving pop rock band Tears for Fears in 1991. The lead single, "Calling Out", made a brief appearance at No.78 in the UK Charts on 14th August 1993. However, the album was ultimately unsuccessful and failed to chart in the UK. A second single, "Words", also failed to chart. Subsequently, the album was never released at all in the US, although advance promotional cassettes were distributed in the US in very limited quantities, indicating that a US release of the album was originally planned.

Smith later stated that he despises the album and alleges that he made it purely to fulfil his recording contract with Phonogram and Mercury Records.

== Critical reception ==
Professional ratings
Review scores
Source	Rating
AllMusic	2/5 stars

The Gazette wrote that "Smith's album is just as studio-professional and wallpaper-forgettable as whatever his fellow former TFF pop snob Roland Orzabal put out."

== Track listing ==
No.	Title	Writer(s)	Length
1.	"Soul on Board"	Curt Smith; Martin Page	5:13
2.	"Calling Out"	Smith; Franne Golde	6:06
3.	"Beautiful to Me"	Smith; Scott Wilk	6:20
4.	"Wonder Child"	Smith; Billy Livsey	4:08
5.	"Words"	Smith; Nicky Holland	4:22
6.	"I Will Be There"	Smith; Page	4:45
7.	"No One Knows Your Name"	Smith; Colin Woore	5:47
8.	"Rain"	Smith; Livsey	4:07
9.	"Come the Revolution"	Smith; Page	4:13
10.	"Still in Love with You"	Phil Lynott	6:45
Total length:			51:42

== Personnel ==
Adapted from AllMusic.

- Curt Smith – lead vocals, backing vocals, guitars, bass
- Jeff Bova – keyboards
- Kim Bullard – keyboards
- Kevin Deane – keyboards
- Billy Livsey – keyboards, backing vocals
- P.J. Moore – keyboards
- Martin Page – keyboards, bass, backing vocals
- Neil Taylor – guitars, backing vocals
- Colin Woore – guitars
- Alan Kamaii – bass
- Jimmy Copley – drums
- Steve Ferrone – drums
- Paulinho da Costa – percussion
- Carole Steele – percussion
- Barry Finclair – strings
- Charles McCraken – strings
- David Nadien – strings
- Richard Sortomme – strings
- Peter Cox – backing vocals
- Lynn Davis – backing vocals
- Diosa – backing vocals
- Siedah Garrett – backing vocals
- Franne Golde – backing vocals
- Toi Marcell – backing vocals
- Jean McClain – backing vocals
- Taz I.E. No Fisk (Ketrina Askew) – rap (9)

Production

- Bob Kranes – A&R
- Curt Smith – producer
- Martin Page – producer (1, 6, 9), engineer (1, 6, 9)
- Kevin Deane – producer (2, 3, 5)
- Chris Kimsey – producer (4, 8, 10), engineer (4, 8, 10)
- Jeff Lorenzen – engineer (1, 6, 9)
- Ed Thacker – engineer (1, 6, 9)
- Paul Logus – engineer (2, 3, 5)
- Jeff Graham – engineer (4, 7, 8, 10)
- Mick Guzauski – engineer (4, 7, 8, 10), additional recording (4, 7, 8, 10), mixing
- Richard McKernan – engineer (4, 7, 8, 10)
- Paul Orofino – engineer (7)
- Scott Hull – mastering at Masterdisk (New York, NY)
- Michael Bays – art direction, design
- Étsuko Iseki – art direction, design
- Frank Ockenfels – photography
