= Change (Tears for Fears song) =

Single by Tears for Fears

from the album The Hurting
- B-side: "The Conflict"
- Released: 28 January 1983
- Genre: Synth-pop; new wave
- Length: 3:52 (7" version); 4:14 (album version); 4:40 (new version); 6:00 (extended version)
- Label: Phonogram; Mercury
- Songwriter: Roland Orzabal
- Producers: Chris Hughes; Ross Cullum

Tears for Fears singles chronology
"Mad World" (1982)	"Change" (1983)	"Pale Shelter" (1983)

Music video
- "Change" on YouTube

"Change" is a song by the English new wave band Tears for Fears. Written by Roland Orzabal and sung by bassist Curt Smith, it was the band's fourth single release. It would eventually become the second hit from their debut LP The Hurting (1983) and second UK top 5 chart hit, following the success of "Mad World". The song also gave Tears for Fears their first charting single in the United States when it cracked the Billboard Hot 100 in August 1983. "Change" was also a big international success, reaching the top 40 in numerous countries.

== Meaning ==
When asked about the song, main songwriter Roland Orzabal replied, "It's not really about much. It's just one of those cheap pop lyrics."

== Release ==
"Change" was released in the United Kingdom in January 1983 with "The Conflict" as the B-side on all editions of the single.

The 7" version of "Change" is the same mix of the song found on The Hurting, but in a slightly edited form. An extended remix of the song is showcased as the lead track on the 12" single. Although uncredited on the singles themselves, this mix is labeled the "New Version" on the UK cassette release of The Hurting, where it was included as a bonus track. Featuring an alternate set of lyrics, this version actually predates the 7" mix, despite its title.

It's a step backwards to what we were doing before "Mad World"... the version on The Hurting is a vast improvement.

— Curt Smith

== Critical reception ==
Reviewing the single for Record Mirror, Mark Cooper said that the song's backing track was "quite possibly, a masterpiece" and that the song as a whole demonstrated "no signs of real character".

== Music video ==
The music video for "Change" was directed by Clive Richardson, best known for his early work with Depeche Mode.

== Track listings ==
7": Mercury / IDEA4 (United Kingdom, Ireland) / 812 677-7 (United States) / 6059 596 (Australia, Europe, South Africa) / 7PP-101 (Japan)

1. "Change" (3:52)
2. "The Conflict" (4:02)

12": Mercury / IDEA412 (United Kingdom) / 6400 730 (Europe)

1. "Change" (extended version) (5:54)
2. "Change" (3:52)
3. "The Conflict" (4:02)

12": Mercury / IDEA412 (United Kingdom) / 6400 730 (Australia) / SOVX 2322 (Canada)

1. "Change" (extended version) (5:54)
2. "Change" (new version) (4:33)
3. "The Conflict" (4:02)
- The "new version" is not specifically identified as such on this release

== Personnel ==
Tears for Fears

- Roland Orzabal – guitar, keyboards, rhythm programming
- Curt Smith – lead vocals, bass, keyboards
- Manny Elias – drums, rhythm programming
- Ian Stanley – keyboards and computer programming

Additional personnel

- Chris Hughes – rhythm programming, tuned percussion, conducting
- Ross Cullum – dynamic toggle (percussion)

== Charts ==
Chart (1983)	Peak position
Australia (Kent Music Report)	29
Belgium (Ultratop 50 Flanders)	30
Canada Top Singles (RPM)	23
Ireland (IRMA)	8
Netherlands (Dutch Top 40 Tipparade)	4
Netherlands (Single Top 100)	32
New Zealand (Recorded Music NZ)	36
South Africa (Springbok Radio)	5
UK Singles (Official Charts)	4
US Billboard Hot 100	73
US Mainstream Rock Airplay (Billboard)	22
US Cash Box	74
