= Suffer the Children (song) =

1981 single by Tears for Fears

Single by Tears for Fears
- B-side: "Wino"
- Released: 30 October 1981; 23 August 1985 (re-issue)
- Recorded: 1981
- Studio: Crescent (Bath)
- Genre: Pop; synth-pop
- Length: 3:36 (single version); 3:50 (album version); 4:12 (12-inch remix version)
- Label: Phonogram; Mercury
- Songwriter: Roland Orzabal
- Producer: David Lord

Tears for Fears singles chronology
"Suffer the Children" (1981)	"Pale Shelter (You Don't Give Me Love)" (1982)
"Head over Heels" (1985)	"Suffer the Children [second release]" (1985)	"Pale Shelter (You Don't Give Me Love) [third release]" (1985)

"Suffer the Children" is the debut single by the English new wave band Tears for Fears. Written and sung by Roland Orzabal and released in October 1981, it was the band's first release, recorded shortly after the break-up of Orzabal and Curt Smith's previous band Graduate. The original single was produced by David Lord and recorded at his own facility, Crescent Studios in Bath, England. The song would eventually be re-recorded for inclusion on Tears for Fears' debut LP The Hurting (1983), this time produced by Chris Hughes and Ross Cullum.

== Origins and production ==
Along with "Pale Shelter", "Suffer the Children" was one of two demo songs that landed Tears for Fears their first record deal with Phonogram in 1981.

"Suffer the Children" was the first song we did together when we left Graduate. It was our very first experimentation with sequencers and drum machines, with a guy called David Lord, who worked with Peter Gabriel and different people down in Bath. So that was actually the first song we did as Tears For Fears.

— Curt Smith

According to Orzabal:

...We were really big on this at the time – we really thought children were born innocent and good and holy... When you've got kids of your own, you realize how bloody difficult it is. But it's that kind of thing – saying look at what you're doing with your child.

— Roland Orzabal

The song was later re-recorded by producers Chris Hughes and Ross Cullum for inclusion on the band's debut album The Hurting in 1983. This recording is distinct from the original 7-inch version by the subtraction of an extra Curt Smith-sung lyric at the beginning of the song. Both the original version and re-recording of the song notably feature Orzabal's wife Caroline on a "child vocal" during the bridge.

== Release and reissue ==
"Suffer the Children" was released as a United Kingdom-only single in both 7-inch and 12-inch formats. The 7-inch features the original recording of the song, while the 12-inch features both remix and instrumental versions. Both formats featured a short B-side, "Wino", which, minus synthesizers or production of any sort, was uncharacteristic of the band's body of work at the time. Despite being added to the playlists of influential Radio 1 disc jockeys John Peel and Peter Powell, the single failed to chart.

In 1985, following the massive success of the band's second album Songs from the Big Chair, Phonogram Records reissued the single complete with a new variation of the original picture sleeve. Featuring the same formats and track listings as the original 1981 release, the single was moderately successful, barely missing the UK top 50.

No music video was produced for the song.

All three original single variations of "Suffer the Children" (plus "Wino") remained unreleased on compact disc until the 30th anniversary reissue of The Hurting in 2013.

== Reception ==
Sunie Fletcher of Record Mirror called the song an "OMD-ish ditty", adding, "I don't doubt their sincerity, but kind thoughts do not a pop song make, nor well-meant words a hit. Still, it makes a change from exegesis." In a retrospective review, AllMusic's Stewart Mason drew comparisons to OMD and early Depeche Mode while noting, "What keeps 'Suffer the Children' from being just another slice of post-Joy Division indie miserablism is the fact that Orzabal cannily sets the lyrics to an extremely catchy chorus and a percolating synth-pop groove."

== Track listings ==
7-inch: Mercury / IDEA1 (United Kingdom)

1. "Suffer the Children" – 3:36
2. "Wino" – 2:17

12-inch: Mercury / IDEA12 (United Kingdom)

1. "Suffer the Children" (remix) – 4:15
2. "Suffer the Children" (instrumental) – 4:26
3. "Wino" – 2:17

== Charts ==
Chart performance for "Suffer the Children"
Chart (1985)	Peak position
UK Singles (Official Charts)	52
