= Donnie Darko (soundtrack) =

Donnie Darko: Music from the Original Motion Picture Score

Soundtrack album by Michael Andrews
- Released: April 2, 2002
- Recorded: October–December 2000
- Studios: Elgonix Labs, Los Angeles, US
- Genres: Ambient; post-punk; soundtrack; new wave; gothic pop
- Length: 37:21
- Language: English
- Labels: Enjoy Records; Everloving Records

Singles from Donnie Darko
- 1. "Mad World" Released: December 15, 2003

Donnie Darko: Music from the Original Motion Picture Score is a soundtrack album by American musician Michael Andrews, released in April 2002 on Enjoy and Everloving Records. It contains music from the 2001 science fiction psychological thriller film Donnie Darko, written and directed by Richard Kelly. It consists of 16 instrumental tracks and two covers of "Mad World" by Tears for Fears sung by American singer Gary Jules.

== Production ==
Richard Kelly commissioned Michael Andrews, a San Diego musician and television and film composer who had worked as a member of a range of bands, including The Origin with Gary Jules, whose two solo albums he had produced, and The Greyboy Allstars. Kelly said that he was confident that Michael Andrews could do the job: "I met with Michael and I just knew right away that he was really, really talented and that he could come up with a really original score. He would allow me to be in there and be really kind of editorial with how I wanted the score to be."

Michael Andrews relocated to Los Angeles to work on the film between October and December 2000. As Michael Andrews states, the low budget for the project encouraged him to play a diverse range of instruments for the soundtrack:

The film was pretty low budget so my portion of the money was pretty thin. I couldn't hire anyone, it was just me. I played everything; piano, mellotron, mini marimba, xylophone, ukulele, organ. I also brought in two female vocalists Sam Shelton and Tori Haberman. But no guitar because Richard said no guitar or drums; he just wasn't into it. I was down with that - I've played guitar my whole life.

Like many of his role models for soundtrack composing such as John Barry and Ennio Morricone, Michael Andrews wanted to put a song on his otherwise instrumental score. He eventually chose "Mad World" (1982) by Tears for Fears, who were one of his and childhood friend Gary Jules' favourite bands while growing up. Andrews enlisted Jules to sing the song, while Andrews himself played the piano. Other songs featured in the film include "The Killing Moon" by Echo & the Bunnymen (another of Andrews' and Jules' favourite bands), Joy Division's "Love Will Tear Us Apart", The Church's "Under the Milky Way" in the party scene, and "Proud to Be Loud" by the band Dead Green Mummies.

Andrews' style of composing owes much to the ground-breaking Symphony No. 3 (Symphony of Sorrowful Songs) by Henryk Górecki, to which Cherita mimes on stage. An excerpt of "For Whom the Bell Tolls", as composed by Steve Baker and Carmen Daye, starts the credit sequence at the end of the film. This music was however not included in the album-version of the soundtrack.

In the 2004 director's cut, a number of musical choices are changed. In the film's opening, "The Killing Moon" by Echo & the Bunnymen is replaced by "Never Tear Us Apart" by INXS. "The Killing Moon" later replaces "Under the Milky Way" by The Church during the party scene. "Under The Milky Way" can be heard in the car scene with Donnie and his father, played on the radio. Many of these tracks were originally meant to be on the soundtrack, but could not be obtained for licensing reasons.

== Release ==
Professional ratings
Review scores
Source	Rating
AllMusic	4/5 stars

The score was not put on a soundtrack album until Andy Factor, a friend of Michael Andrews, released it on his independent label, Everloving Records, in 2002. As Donnie Darko was not a hit at first, there was little interest in the soundtrack in the United States. However, the film enjoyed more popularity in Europe, especially in the UK, where its total box office was greater than that for the whole of the U.S., and so the Donnie Darko soundtrack album was released.

This sparked interest in the soundtrack and in the song "Mad World", taken from the original soundtrack, which was a 2003 Christmas Number One in the UK singles chart. It has also made the charts in a number of other countries including Ireland, Denmark, the Netherlands, and Australia in 2003 and 2004.

Madonna sampled the song "Manipulated Living" for the video introduction on her 2008/2009 Sticky & Sweet Tour.

== Track listing ==
All songs were written and performed by Michael Andrews except "Mad World", "Head over Heels", and "The Killing Moon".

1. "Carpathian Ridge" – 1:35
2. "The Tangent Universe" – 1:50
3. "The Artifact & Living" – 2:30
4. "Middlesex Times" – 1:41
5. "Manipulated Living" – 2:08
6. "Philosophy of Time Travel" – 2:02
7. "Liquid Spear Waltz" – 1:32
8. "Gretchen Ross" – 0:51
9. "Burn It to the Ground" – 1:58
10. "Slipping Away" – 1:17
11. "Rosie Darko" – 1:25
12. "Cellar Door" – 1:03
13. "Ensurance Trap" – 3:11
14. "Waltz in the 4th Dimension" – 2:46
15. "Time Travel" – 3:01
16. "Did You Know Him?" – 1:46
17. "Mad World" – 3:08
18. "Mad World" (Alternate Mix) – 3:37
19. "Head over Heels" by Tears for Fears – 2:36
20. "The Killing Moon" by Echo & the Bunnymen – 3:16
21. "Notorious" by Duran Duran

== 2004 British re-release ==
Coinciding with the release of the film's director's cut, an expanded two-disc edition of the album was released in the United Kingdom in 2004. This edition included the 1980s pop and alternative rock songs from the theatrical edition and the director's cut.

1. "Never Tear Us Apart" by INXS – 3:04
2. "Head Over Heels" by Tears for Fears – 4:16
3. "Under the Milky Way" by The Church – 4:58
4. "Lucid Memory" by Sam Bauer and Gerard Bauer – 0:46
5. "Lucid Assembly" by Gerard Bauer and Mike Bauer – 0:52
6. "Ave Maria" by Vladimir Vavilov and Paul Pritchard – 2:57
7. "For Whom the Bell Tolls" by Steve Baker and Carmen Daye – 3:12
8. "Show Me (Part 1)" by Quito Colayco and Tony Hertz – 2:05
9. "Notorious" by Duran Duran – 4:00
10. "Stay" by Oingo Boingo – 3:38
11. "Love Will Tear Us Apart" by Joy Division – 3:23
12. "The Killing Moon" by Echo & the Bunnymen – 5:55

=== Disc two ===
The second disc is devoted to a remastered version of Andrews' score.

== Personnel ==
- Michael Andrews – performer
- Todd Burke – engineer, mixing
- Shannon Erbe – music editor
- Gary Jules – vocals
- Richard Kelly – liner notes
- Mike King – package design
- Roger Seibel – mastering
- Sam Shelton – backing vocals
