= Round Pond (London) =

Ornamental lake in Kensington Gardens, London, England

Coordinates: 51°30′21″N 0°11′0″W

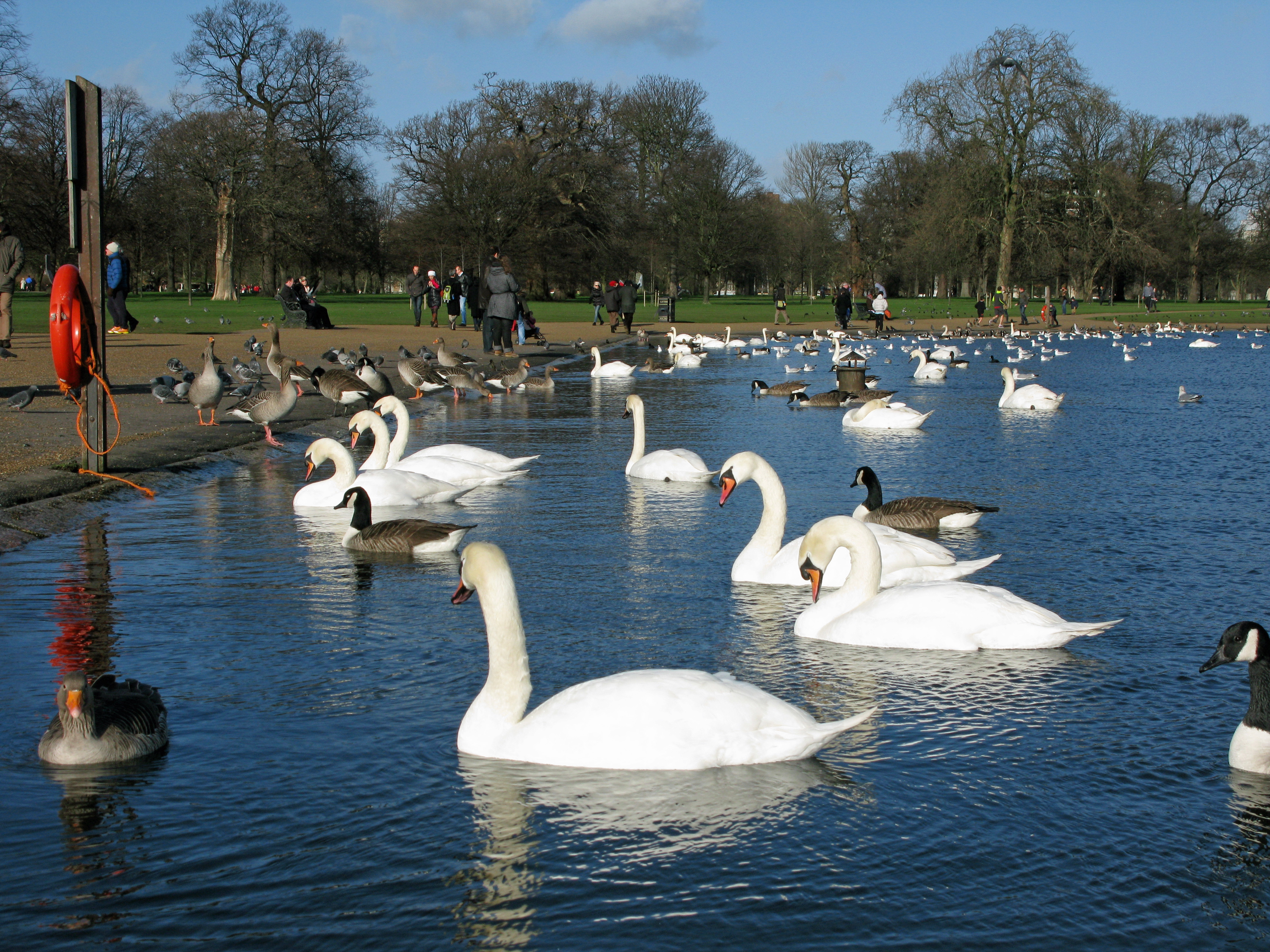
Mute swans and Canada geese on the Round Pond

The Round Pond is an ornamental lake in Kensington Gardens, London, in front of Kensington Palace.

The pond was created in 1730 by George II. It is approximately seven acres (2.8 ha) in extent, measuring approximately 200 by 150 metres (660 by 490 ft). It is up to 5 metres (16 ft) deep. Despite its name, it is not circular, but rectangular with stepped and rounded corners. With a long history of popularity with model yacht enthusiasts, it is the home of the Model Yacht Sailing Association (established 1876) and the London Model Yacht Club (established 1884).

The cover photo for the 1981 Tears for Fears single "Mad World" was taken at Round Pond.
