= The Way You Are (Tears for Fears song) =

Single by Tears for Fears
- B-side: "The Marauders"
- Released: 25 November 1983
- Length: 4:53
- Label: Phonogram; Mercury
- Songwriters: Roland Orzabal; Curt Smith; Ian Stanley; Manny Elias
- Producers: Chris Hughes; Ross Cullum

Tears for Fears singles chronology
"Pale Shelter" (1983)	"The Way You Are" (1983)	"Mothers Talk" (1984)

12" single cover

Music video
- "The Way You Are" on YouTube

"The Way You Are" is a song by the English new wave band Tears for Fears. It was the band's sixth single release overall and their fourth UK Top 40 hit. Released as a single in November 1983, it was intended as a stopgap between the band's first and second albums, mainly to keep the group in the public eye, and was not included on the band's second album.

== Background ==
The song is the only one to be written by the full band, including keyboardist Ian Stanley and drummer Manny Elias. It was written while on tour in support of the band's debut album The Hurting in 1983. Produced by Chris Hughes and Ross Cullum, who produced The Hurting, the song utilised sampled voices and rhythms. Bassist Curt Smith performs lead vocal on the song.

Both it and the instrumental B-side "The Marauders" were later included on the band's 1996 B-sides and rarities collection Saturnine Martial & Lunatic, and on the 2006 Deluxe Edition reissue of Songs from the Big Chair. The extended 12" version of the song was included on the 1999 remastered version of The Hurting.

Band members Roland Orzabal and Curt Smith have been uncompromising in their dislike for the song in the years following its release, Orzabal stating it was "the point we realized we had to change direction", while Smith was even more direct in proclaiming it "the worst thing we've done". Smith reaffirmed this position in a 2014 interview with Consequence of Sound.

We were basically coerced by the record company to go in and do something to release quickly after The Hurting was successful. That's what we came up with. Our A&R guy thought it was the best thing we'd ever done. It was just so fragmented to me; it's just something created in the studio. We realized for us it's the song first and then you produce it. With that we definitely produced it, made it different, made it clever, and I think it was a failure. For us personally, I don't think it was anything we enjoyed.

— Curt Smith

== Track listings ==
7": Mercury / IDEA6 (United Kingdom) / 814 954-7 (Australia, Europe)

1. "The Way You Are" (4:53)
2. "The Marauders" (4:14)

2×7": Mercury / IDEAS6 (United Kingdom)

1. "The Way You Are" (4:53)
2. "The Marauders" (4:14)
3. "Change [Live in Oxford]" (4:36)
4. "Start of the Breakdown [Live in Oxford]" (5:53)

12": Mercury / IDEA612 (United Kingdom) / 814 954-1 (Netherlands) / 818 087-1 (Germany)

1. "The Way You Are [Extended Version]" (7:33)
2. "The Marauders" (4:14)
3. "Start of the Breakdown [Live in Oxford]" (5:53)

12": Mercury / 15PP-42 (Japan)

1. "The Way You Are [Extended Version]" (7:33)
2. "Pale Shelter [New Extended Version]" (6:41)
3. "The Marauders" (4:14)
4. "We Are Broken" (4:03)
5. "Start of the Breakdown [Live in Oxford]" (5:53)

== Personnel ==
Credits adapted from Tidal.

- Curt Smith – bass, lead vocals
- Roland Orzabal – guitar, backing vocals
- Ian Stanley – keyboards
- Manny Elias – drums

== Charts ==
Chart performance for "The Way You Are"
Chart (1984)	Peak position
UK Singles (Official Charts)	24
