= The Shadow Bureau =

Musical duo of Bon Harris and Jeehun Hwang

The Shadow Bureau is a musical collaboration between Nitzer Ebb’s Bon Harris and Jeehun Hwang, an award-winning songwriter and video game, film, and TV composer. The duo is the main force behind the group with a rotating cast of guest collaborators to serve the project as needed by Harris and Hwang. In January 2011, Harris and Hwang were recruited by independent film company Indomina Media to create a demo reel for several of the company's indie films. They were asked to create non-traditional soundtracks and this collaboration gave birth to The Shadow Bureau.

== Single releases ==
The duo's first scored song, "Axis Of Envy" was for the martial arts film True Legend and featured the vocals of West End Girls singer Isabelle Erkendal and lyrics and vocals by Kraftwerk's Wolfgang Flür. The movie was released in the U.S. on May 13, 2011.
