= Secret World wildlife rescue =

Secret World
- Formation: 1992
- Founder: Pauline Kidner
- Location: Somerset, England
- Website: https://secretworld.org

Secret World wildlife rescue is an animal rescue centre and charity based in East Huntspill, near Highbridge in Somerset, England. Founded by Pauline Kidner in 1984, this charity specializes in the rescue, rehabilitation and release of British wildlife. They work on an 8 am – 8 pm basis 365 days a year, with a team of experts on hand for any casualty or orphan that may be brought in. Each year they rescue roughly 5,000 wild animals, from badgers and otters to swans and birds of prey.

They rely greatly on the work of their volunteers, with volunteer response drivers located across Somerset, Bristol, Wiltshire, Dorset, Devon and South Gloucestershire who are all trained to bring in a variety of different British wildlife. Volunteer animal carers who help care for the animals and receptionists are also vital to their operations.

Supporters of the center include Simon King, Chris Packham, Martin Hughes-Games, Michaela Strachan, Tony Head, Chris Sperring, Mike Dilger, Jilly Cooper, Valerie Singleton, Desmond Morris and Sarah Fisher.

== Mission ==
The group aim to care for wildlife species so they recover their health and can be returned to live with a high quality of life in the wild. In this sense, the organisation sees itself as a staging post for animals prior to their release, rather than as a zoo where animals are kept indefinitely. They aim to return all animals back to where they were found, however this is not always possible so instead, they find them the most suitable alternative release sites. Another of secret worlds missions is to educate and inform the general public about British Wildlife. Throughout the year their learning team spend their time visiting local schools and hosting schools onsite in the newly completed learning facility, to teach the students about all the different creatures the British countryside has to offer. There are specific days in the year when Secret World opens to the public, with animal talks taking place so the visitors can also learn about these animals.

=== Rescue, rehabilitation and release ===
Animals are either brought in by members of the public or picked up by one of their many volunteer response drivers who are located across the South West. Receptionists at Secret World are on hand from 8 am to 8 pm, where they answer calls to help analyse the situation, with animal carers nearby to help give any advice when needed. Once an animal is brought in it will be assessed and veterinary care is given if needed. Whilst there the animal will continue to be looked after with volunteers and workers giving 24 hour care, giving them their hourly feeds or whatever the animal may require. On site they have extensive facilities, with hospital rooms, and treatment and recovery areas which help in giving all casualties the best possible chance in recovery. During the rehabilitation process, every effort is made to reduce the risk of imprinting, by reducing human interaction and contact where ever possible. After the rehabilitation process the next stage is for the animal to be released, and they make sure they are 100% recovered and ready before being released. They aim to release the animals where they were found, in a hope to be reunited with their families and homes however this is not always possible. Potential sites are surveyed and vetted for suitability. They specialize in 'soft-releases', enclosures that are set up where the animals are to be released. Here the animal will stay for a few weeks, still without human contact, getting used to the environment and overall settling in, before the gates are opened and they are free to live their lives in the wild. Many animals are also monitored after release.

This whole process from rescue to release aims to give the animals the best chance of survival, and the animals needs are always prioritized.

== History ==
Secret World, originally established by Pauline Kidner as New Road Farm, opened in 1984 as a visitor farm and wildlife rescue and was open to the general public. In 1992, Bluebell Sett was opened to support the farm and was registered as a charity in 1995. The organization was renamed to Secret World Wildlife Rescue in 2005.

== Media coverage ==
Secret World appeared on ITV's Secret World (2000). This focused on Pauline Kidner and Secret World and threw them into the spotlight, with the casualties being admitted rising from 1000 a year to 3000 a year after the show aired.
