= Manny Elias =

- Born: Emmanuel Franklin Elías; 21 February 1953 (age 73); Calcutta, India
- Genres: Rock; hard rock; pop rock; new wave
- Occupations: Drummer; record producer
- Instrument: Drums
- Label: Phonogram
- Formerly of: Interview; Neon; Tears for Fears; The Believers

Emmanuel Franklin Elías (born 21 February 1953) is a British drummer and record producer. He is notable for being the original drummer with the English pop rock band Tears for Fears during the 1980s.

== Career ==
Emmanuel "Manny" Elías was born in Calcutta, India, to British parents. He was originally a member of the rock band Interview, from Bathford, Somerset. Elias was in the band Neon; when they disbanded, he and members Curt Smith and Roland Orzabal formed Tears for Fears. Elias began working with Tears for Fears in 1981 and drummed on the studio albums The Hurting (1983) and Songs from the Big Chair (1985), as well as participating in their subsequent tours. Elias is credited as an official member of Tears for Fears on those two studio albums, and appears in six of the band's music videos from that era. In addition, he has co-writing credits on "The Way You Are" and "The Working Hour".

Since parting ways with Tears for Fears in 1986, Elias has provided percussion on albums from such artists as Peter Gabriel, Peter Hammill and Julian Lennon. He was also a member of the Believers, along with Gary Tibbs and Andy Skelton; the band released one studio album in 1992.
