= Graduate (band) =

English new wave and mod revival band

- Origin: Bath, Somerset, England
- Genres: New wave; mod revival; ska
- Years active: 1978–1981
- Spinoffs: Tears for Fears
- Past members: Roland Orzabal; Curt Smith; John Baker; Steve Buck; Andy Marsden

Graduate were an English new wave and mod revival musical group formed in 1978 in Bath, England. The band released a single entitled "Elvis Should Play Ska" and an album entitled Acting My Age. The band were unsuccessful and broke up in 1981. Future Tears for Fears members Roland Orzabal and Curt Smith were members of Graduate.

== Band history ==
The band formed in 1978 in Bath. Orzabal and Baker ( originally The Baker Brothers) formed the band initially playing Simon and Garfunkel covers and a few originals. They became a new wave and mod revival band. Band members included Roland Orzabal, Curt Smith, John Baker, Steve Buck, and Andy Marsden.

In 1979, Graduate signed a publishing deal with Tony Hatch who subsequently offered the group to Pye Records. Graduate recorded their debut album Acting My Age at Crescent Studios Bath in January 1980. Their first single, "Elvis Should Play Ska", reached number 82 in the UK Singles Chart in April 1980 and reached the Top 10 in Spain.the second single Ever Met a day was a Radio favourite in the UK and the band performed it on children’s TV programme Runaround in May 1980

The band broke up in 1981 after undertaking a gruelling tour of Germany

== After Graduate ==
In 1981, Orzabal and Smith went on to form the new wave band Tears for Fears.John Baker joined British chart band The Korgis

== Personnel ==
- Roland Orzabal – vocals, lead guitar
- Curt Smith – bass guitar, vocals
- John Baker – rhythm guitar, vocals
- Steve Buck – keyboards
- Andy Marsden – drums

== Albums ==
Title	Album details
Acting My Age	Released: 1980; Debut studio album. Remastered with extra tracks in 2001.
Ambitions	Cancelled before completion. All tracks can be found on the 2001 expanded remaster of Acting My Age.
Graduate	Released: 1991; German-only release featuring many of the tracks from Acting My Age but with two different versions of the song "Shut Up" and the song "I See Through You" from the unfinished Ambitions album.
