= Everybody Loves a Happy Ending =

2004 studio album by Tears for Fears

Studio album by Tears for Fears
- Released: 14 September 2004
- Recorded: 2001–2004
- Studios: Charlton's Garage (Sherman Oaks, California); Sound City Studios (Van Nuys, California); O'Henry Sound Studios (Burbank, California); Old Soul Studios (Catskill, New York).
- Genres: Pop rock; art pop
- Length: 54:35
- Label: New Door
- Producers: Tears for Fears; Charlton Pettus

Tears for Fears chronology
The Collection (2003)	Everybody Loves a Happy Ending (2004)	Secret World Live in Paris (2006)

Singles from Everybody Loves a Happy Ending
- 1. "Closest Thing to Heaven" Released: 21 February 2005; 2. "Everybody Loves a Happy Ending" / "Call Me Mellow" Released: 13 June 2005

Everybody Loves a Happy Ending is the sixth studio album by the English pop rock band Tears for Fears, released on 14 September 2004 in the United States and on 7 March 2005 in the United Kingdom and Europe.

The album marked Tears for Fears' comeback following a hiatus in the late 1990s, as well as the return of founding member Curt Smith. However, it performed modestly on the UK and US music charts compared to the band's previous records. The band focused primarily on touring in the years following Everybody Loves a Happy Ending's release, with a follow-up album not being completed until nearly eighteen years later.

== Release ==
Work on the album began in 2000, after Orzabal and Smith ended their longstanding feud. The album was originally due for release on the Arista label, but personnel changes in the label's management (namely the departure of L.A. Reid who had signed the duo) led to the band breaking ties with the label before any music was commercially released, with the record company only pressing up a number of red vinyl promos. As Orzabal and Smith own the copyright, they left Arista without having to re-record the album and struck up a number of deals to release the record with various independent/heritage record labels around the world. The album eventually surfaced in the US in 2004 when it was released on the New Door label (a subsidiary of Universal Music), and in the UK in 2005 on the British independent label Gut Records. In 2020, after Orzabal and Smith signed with Irving and Jeff Azoff's Full Stop management company the record appeared on various streaming services worldwide.

According to SoundScan figures, the album had sold 99,000 copies in the US by January 2008.

== Reception ==
Professional ratings
Aggregate scores
Source	Rating
Metacritic	65/100
Review scores
Source	Rating
AllMusic	4/5 stars
The Austin Chronicle	2/5 stars
Blender	1/5 stars
The Boston Chronicle	3/5 stars
Drowned in Sound	5/10
The Guardian	3/5 stars
Mojo	3/5 stars
Q	2/5 stars
The Scotsman	3/5 stars
The Times	2/5 stars
Uncut	4/10

At Metacritic, which assigns a normalised rating out of 100 to reviews from mainstream critics, Everybody Loves a Happy Ending has an average score of 65 based on 12 reviews, indicating "generally favorable reviews".

James Christopher Monger of AllMusic gave a positive review, giving the album four stars, observing. "Everybody Loves a Happy Ending will do little to convert those who winced at Orzabal and Smith's obtuse lyrics and over the top production the first time around, but loyal followers, fans of XTC's Apple Venus, Pt. 1, and lovers of intricately arranged and artfully executed pop music will find themselves delightfully consumed by another chapter from this enigmatic group." The Guardian critic Betsy Reed called it "spectacular", but she does call the "hummability factor" "nil, which matters when there's a melodic back catalogue by which to judge this album." In a review for Drowned in Sound, Tom Edwards gave the album a 5 out of 10, stating "When Mansun released their debut album, 'Attack Of The Grey Lantern', back in 1997 critics accused them of sounding like Tears For Fears. I couldn't see more than a passing resemblance at the time, but listening to 'Everybody Loves A Happy Ending' this alleged similarity becomes unavoidable.", he notes that "not a total loss. To put into context, it’s a damn sight less disappointing than the new Duran Duran folly, and over time even many of the lesser tracks begin to sink in to the psyche"

== Track listing ==
No.	Title	Writer(s)	Length
1.	"Everybody Loves a Happy Ending"	Orzabal, Smith, Pettus	4:21
2.	"Closest Thing to Heaven"	Orzabal, Smith, Pettus	3:36
3.	"Call Me Mellow"	Orzabal, Smith, Pettus	3:39
4.	"Size of Sorrow"	Orzabal	4:43
5.	"Who Killed Tangerine?"	Orzabal, Smith, Pettus	5:33
6.	"Quiet Ones"	Orzabal	4:22
7.	"Who You Are"	Smith, Pettus	3:41
8.	"The Devil"	Orzabal	3:30
9.	"Secret World"	Orzabal	5:12
10.	"Killing with Kindness"	Orzabal, Smith, Pettus	5:25
11.	"Ladybird"	Orzabal, Smith, Pettus	4:50
12.	"Last Days on Earth"	Orzabal, Smith, Pettus	5:41

Bonus tracks (British, French, and Italian releases)
No.	Title	Writer(s)	Length
13.	"Pullin' a Cloud"	Orzabal, Dorsey, MacLeod	2:48
14.	"Out of Control"	Orzabal, Smith, Griffiths, Pettus	5:08

Notes

- "Size of Sorrow" was written by Roland Orzabal in the 1990s and was first performed live during Tears for Fears' Elemental tour in 1993, as one of several new and unreleased songs at that time. This earlier version featured slightly different lyrics and the lead vocal was performed by vocalist/bass player Gail Ann Dorsey who was working and touring with the band at the time after the departure of Curt Smith. The studio version, as heard on this album, was sung by Smith.
- "Who You Are" is the first original song released by Tears For Fears to not credit Orzabal as a writer. A different version of the song appears on Curt Smith's solo album Halfway, Pleased, released in 2007.
- "Ladybird" quotes the English nursery rhyme "Ladybird Ladybird" in its chorus. It was the first collaboration between Smith and Orzabal since the split. Smith had presented the chorus to Orzabal, who wrote a verse to it. The first song written entirely together for the album was "Closest Thing to Heaven".

== Personnel ==
=== Tears for Fears ===
- Roland Orzabal – lead vocals, keyboards, guitars
- Curt Smith – keyboards, bass, backing vocals, lead vocals (4, 7)

=== Additional musicians ===
- Charlton Pettus – keyboards, guitars
- Kenny Siegal – guitars (4), backing vocals (5)
- Fred Eltringham – drums
- Brian Geltner – drums (4)
- Joel Peskin – baritone saxophone (9), tenor saxophone (9)
- Steve Kujala – flute (9)
- Rick Baptist – trumpet (1)
- Gary Grant – trumpet, flugelhorn (9)
- David Washburn – trumpet, flugelhorn (9)
- Alexander Giglio – backing vocals (5)
- Gwen Snyder – backing vocals (5)
- Laura Gray – crowd vocals (5)
- Julian Orzabal – crowd vocals (5)

Orchestra on "Secret World"

- Paul Buckmaster – arrangements and conductor
- Suzie Katayama – contractor
- Stefanie Fife, Barry Gold, Maurice Grants, Vahe Hayrikyan, Suzie Katayama, Miguel Martinez, Dan Smith and Rudy Stein – cello
- Gayle Levant – harp
- Bob Becker, Denyse Buffman, Roland Kato, Carole Mukogawa, Karie Prescott and Evan Wilson – viola
- Charlie Bisharat, Eve Butler, Mario DeLeon, Joel Derouin, Julian Hallmark, Armen Garabedian, Berj Garabedian, Norm Hughes, Peter Kent, Michael Markman, Robert Matsuda, Sid Page, Sandra Park, Sara Parkins, Bob Peterson, Lesa Terry, Josefina Veraga and John Wittenberg – violin

Technical personnel

- Tears for Fears – producers
- Charlton Pettus – producer, recording, drum recording (12)
- Neil Dorfsman – drum recording (1, 2, 3, 5–11)
- Tom Schick – drum recording (4), additional guitar recording (4)
- Miles Wilson – drum recording assistant
- Mark O'Donoughue – additional engineer
- Steve Churchyard – orchestra session recording (9)
- Tim Palmer – mixing at Larrabee North (North Hollywood, California)
- Andy Gwynn – mix assistant
- Pete Novak – mix assistant
- Stephen Marcussen – mastering at Marcussen Mastering (Hollywood, California, USA)
- Jayce Murphy – Nuendo programming
- Michael Kachko – product manager
- Cindi Peters – project coordinator
- Ute Friesleben – production manager
- Alan Aldridge – illustrations, logo design
- Ryan Rogers – additional design
- Zoren Gold – photography
- The Firm – management

== Charts ==
Chart performance for Everybody Loves a Happy Ending
Chart (2004–2005)	Peak position
Belgian Albums (Ultratop Wallonia)	57
Dutch Albums (Album Top 100)	86
French Albums (SNEP)	28
German Albums (Offizielle Top 100)	35
Italian Albums (FIMI)	68
Scottish Albums (Official Charts)	60
Swiss Albums (Schweizer Hitparade)	48
UK Albums (Official Charts)	45
UK Independent Albums (Official Charts)	10
US Billboard 200	46
