= Pale Shelter =

1982 single by Tears for Fears

"Pale Shelter (You Don't Give Me Love)"

Single by Tears for Fears
- B-side: "The Prisoner"
- Released: 9 April 1982; 23 August 1985 (re-issue)
- Genre: Synth-pop; new wave
- Length: 4:04
- Label: Phonogram; Mercury
- Songwriter: Roland Orzabal
- Producer: Mike Howlett

Tears for Fears singles chronology
"Suffer the Children" (1981)	"Pale Shelter (You Don't Give Me Love)" (1982)	"Mad World" (1982)
"Suffer the Children [second release]" (1985)	"Pale Shelter (You Don't Give Me Love) [third release]" (1985)	"I Believe (A Soulful Re-Recording)" (1985)

"Pale Shelter"

Single by Tears for Fears

from the album The Hurting
- B-side: "We Are Broken"
- Released: 22 April 1983
- Genre: Synth-pop; new wave
- Length: 4:04 (1983 version); 4:34 (album version)
- Label: Phonogram; Mercury
- Songwriter: Roland Orzabal
- Producers: Chris Hughes; Ross Cullum

Tears for Fears singles chronology
"Change" (1983)	"Pale Shelter" (1983)	"The Way You Are" (1983)

Music video
- "Pale Shelter" on YouTube

"Pale Shelter" is a song by the English new wave band Tears for Fears. Written by Roland Orzabal and sung by bassist Curt Smith, it was originally the band's second single release in early 1982. The original version of the song, entitled "Pale Shelter (You Don't Give Me Love)", did not see chart success at the time of its original UK release. However, it did later become a top 20 hit in Canada and a top 75 hit when it was reissued in the UK in 1985.

The generally better-known version was a re-recording from 1983. This version eventually became the third UK top 5 chart hit taken from Tears for Fears' debut LP The Hurting (1983), peaking at number 5. As with the previous two singles, the song also reached the top 40 in several other countries.

== Origin and production ==
Along with "Suffer the Children", "Pale Shelter" was one of two demo songs that landed Tears for Fears their first record deal with Phonogram in 1981. The song began life as a sequence of two chords that Orzabal had been repeatedly playing on acoustic guitar for weeks. The rest of the music and lyrics were eventually written in a single morning. The original demo of the song was recorded at musician Ian Stanley's home studio in Bath, after a chance meeting led to a working relationship with the duo.

After the release of their David Lord-produced debut single "Suffer the Children", "Pale Shelter" was selected as the follow-up. In an effort to sound more commercial, and because Lord was busy recording Peter Gabriel's fourth album, Mike Howlett was brought in to produce. Artistic disagreements between the duo and Howlett (specifically regarding his overuse of Linn drums) led to this being his only work with Tears for Fears. As Curt Smith later noted, "Mike was far too commercial for us. I don't think we felt we were learning anything and we're not good at being pushed in a direction we don't wish to go."

The song was eventually re-recorded by Chris Hughes and Ross Cullum for the band's 1983 debut album The Hurting. Although both recordings of the song open with a sample played in reverse, on the original, it is an extra lyric spoken by Orzabal, while on the album cut, it is a brief piano lick.

=== Meaning ===
It's a kind of a love song, though more referring to one's parents than to a girl.

— Roland Orzabal

The title of the song is a reference to "Pale Shelter Scene", a 1941 drawing by British sculptor Henry Moore.

== Release and reissues ==
"Pale Shelter" was initially released in 1982 as a United Kingdom-only single in both 7" and 12" formats. The 7" features the original recording of the song, while the 12" features an extended version. Both formats featured the B-side "The Prisoner", a noisy, electronic piece inspired by the Peter Gabriel song "Intruder", which showed off the duo's early experiments with synthesizers and sampling. Like "Pale Shelter", this song would also be re-recorded for inclusion on the album The Hurting. Although the single attracted some club play in the United States, it was ultimately a failure in the UK charts.

In 1983, after the success of singles "Mad World" and "Change", the re-recorded version of "Pale Shelter" was given another shot as a single, released in the United Kingdom and Europe in both 7" and 12" formats. The 7" features a slightly edited version of the album cut, while the 12" features a new extended version. To provide a chart push the second time around, Mercury took full advantage of the picture disc and coloured vinyl gimmicks that were popular throughout the 1970s and early 1980s. In all, eleven different variations of the reissued single were available for purchase. All formats of the reissue featured the B-side "We Are Broken", an early version of the song "Broken" which would later appear on Tears for Fears' second album Songs from the Big Chair. Aided by aggressive promotion and the duo's coinciding British concerts (at many of which the song was played twice), "Pale Shelter" finally became a chart success, peaking at No. 5 in the United Kingdom.

In 1985, following up on the massive success of Songs from the Big Chair, Mercury reissued the original Howlett-produced version of "Pale Shelter" as a single, complete with a new variation of the original picture sleeve. Featuring the same formats and track listings as the original 1982 release, the single was a modest success, denting the UK top 75.

=== Canadian special edit ===
Although "Pale Shelter" was not released commercially in the United States, it was issued in Canada in early 1983 to promote The Hurting, albeit in different form. Instead of using the Hughes/Cullum recording found on the album itself, the record company released a unique edit of the original Mike Howlett-produced extended version, which became a top 20 hit in that country.

In 2016, "Pale Shelter" was prominently sampled in the song "Secrets" by Canadian singer the Weeknd.

== Music video ==
The promotional music video for "Pale Shelter" was directed by Steve Barron in early 1983 in Los Angeles. The video, which features a number of odd juxtapositions (including a police officer directing traffic and a live alligator in a swimming pool), is notable for the scene of an imprint of a giant iron on a tarmac at Los Angeles International Airport, with steam apparently coming off the tarmac, onto which Smith and Orzabal walk, and another scene in which the pair walk into a sea of flying paper aeroplanes, with one of them hitting Orzabal directly in the eye. The clip has been included on various Tears for Fears video collections, including 1983's The Videosingles and 1992's Tears Roll Down (Greatest Hits 82–92).

== Track listings ==
7": Mercury / IDEA2 (United Kingdom)

1. "Pale Shelter (You Don't Give Me Love)" (3:55)
2. "The Prisoner" (2:40)

12": Mercury / IDEA212 (United Kingdom)

1. "Pale Shelter (You Don't Give Me Love) [Extended]" (6:25)
2. "Pale Shelter (You Don't Give Me Love)" (3:55)
3. "The Prisoner" (2:40)

7": Mercury / IDEA5 (United Kingdom, Ireland)/ 812 108-7 (Australia, Europe)

1. "Pale Shelter [Album Version]" (4:08)
2. "We Are Broken" (4:03)

12": Mercury / IDEA512 (United Kingdom) / 812 108-1 (Europe)

1. "Pale Shelter [New Extended Version]" (6:41)
2. "Pale Shelter [Album Version]" (4:14)
3. "We Are Broken" (4:03)

7": Vertigo / SOV 2328 (Canada)

1. "Pale Shelter [Canadian Single Version]" (3:57)
2. "We Are Broken" (4:03)

2x7": Vertigo / SOVD 2328 (Canada)

1. "Pale Shelter [Canadian Single Version]" (3:57)
2. "We Are Broken" (4:03)
3. "Mad World [World Remix]" (3:30)
4. "Ideas As Opiates [Original Version]" (3:54)

12": Vertigo / SOVX 2328 (Canada)

1. "Pale Shelter (You Don't Give Me Love) [Extended]" (6:25)
2. "The Prisoner" (2:40)

== Charts ==
Chart (1983)	Peak position
Canada Top Singles (RPM)	12
Germany (GfK)	25
Ireland (IRMA)	5
UK Singles (Official Charts)	5

Year-end chart (1983)	Position
Canada Top Singles (RPM)	83

Chart (1985)	Peak position
UK Singles (Official Charts)	73
