= Mad World =

1982 single by Tears for Fears

Single by Tears for Fears

from the album The Hurting
- B-side: "Ideas as Opiates"; "Saxophones as Opiates"
- Released: 10 September 1982
- Studio: Brittania Row, London; Crescent Studios, Bath (mixing); AIR, London (mixing)
- Genre: Synth-pop; new wave; new pop; art pop
- Length: 3:30
- Label: Phonogram; Mercury
- Songwriter: Roland Orzabal
- Producers: Chris Hughes; Ross Cullum

Tears for Fears singles chronology
| "Pale Shelter (You Don't Give Me Love)" (1982) | "Mad World" (1982) | "Change" (1983) |

Music video
- "Mad World" on YouTube

"Mad World" is a 1982 song by the English new wave band Tears for Fears. Written by Roland Orzabal and sung by bassist Curt Smith, it was the band's third single release and first chart hit, reaching number three on the UK Singles Chart in November 1982. Both "Mad World" and its B-side, "Ideas as Opiates", appeared on the band's debut LP The Hurting (1983). This single was also the band's first international success, reaching the top 40 in several countries in 1982–83. In the UK, it was the 12th best-selling single of 1982.

"Mad World" has since been covered by various artists, including a 2001 version recorded by Michael Andrews and Gary Jules for the soundtrack of the film Donnie Darko; a 2003 single release of the song reached number one in the UK for three consecutive weeks and won Orzabal his second Ivor Novello Award.

The cover photo was taken at Round Pond in Kensington Gardens (London, England).

== Background ==
"Mad World" was originally written on acoustic guitar when Orzabal was 19 after being inspired to write a new wave song in the vein of Duran Duran's "Girls on Film". After a few false starts with Orzabal on vocals, he suggested Smith sing it and "suddenly it sounded fabulous". Retrospectively, it has been suggested that the chorus "Mad World" was partially inspired by the bridge of Cat Stevens' 1966 hit single "Matthew and Son", a similarity that has been referenced by Stevens in live performances.

"Mad World" was intended to be the B-side for the band's second single "Pale Shelter (You Don't Give Me Love)", but their record company stated that "Mad World" could be a single in its own right. The band then opted to re-record "Mad World" with producers Ross Cullum and Chris Hughes, the latter a former drummer with Adam and the Ants.

That came when I lived above a pizza restaurant in Bath and I could look out onto the centre of the city. Not that Bath is very mad – I should have called it "Bourgeois World"!

— Roland Orzabal

"Mad World" was the first single off the finished album. The intention was to gain attention from it and we'd hopefully build up a little following. We had no idea that it would become a hit. Nor did the record company.

— Curt Smith

Curt Smith's ad lib in the song's final chorus resulted in a mondegreen. Smith clarified the actual lyric in 2010:

With Mad World's again-resurgent popularity, I'm getting asked more frequently about the last line on the album version from The Hurting, a line which I occasionally also sing in concert. The actual line is: "Halargian world." (Not "illogical world", "raunchy young world", "enlarging your world", or a number of other interesting if not amusing guesses.) The real story: Halarge was an imaginary planet invented by either Chris Hughes or Ross Cullum during the recording of The Hurting. I added it as a joke during the lead vocal session, and we kept it. And there you have it.

— Curt Smith

== Meaning ==
The song was influenced by the theories of Arthur Janov, author of The Primal Scream. The lyric "the dreams in which I'm dying are the best I've ever had" suggests that dreams of intense experiences such as death will be the best at releasing tension.

== Critical reception ==
Cash Box said that the song "grows on you, expanding from a soft dance tune to a shy Britisher's confessions of his darkest dreams."

== B-side ==
"Ideas as Opiates" is a song that originally served as the B-side to the "Mad World" single. This earlier version was produced by the band themselves, though it was later re-recorded for inclusion on The Hurting. The song takes its name from a chapter title in Arthur Janov's book Prisoners of Pain and features lyrics related to the concept of primal therapy. The song is musically sparse, featuring just a piano, drum machine, and saxophone. An alternative version of this song titled "Saxophones as Opiates" was included as a B-side on the 12-inch single and is mostly instrumental.

That's the chapter from Janov, and it's really a reference to people's mindsets, the way that the ego can suppress so much nasty information about oneself – the gentle way that the mind can fool oneself into thinking everything is great.

— Roland Orzabal

It really was all about that kind of thing – the psychological answer to religion being the opiate of the masses, whereas we thought ideas were, more than anything else.

— Curt Smith

== Music video ==
The promotional video for "Mad World" was filmed in late summer 1982, in the grounds of Knebworth House. It was Tears for Fears' first music video, and features Curt Smith staring out of a window while Roland Orzabal dances outside on a lakeside jetty. A brief party scene in the video features friends and family of the band, including Smith's mother as well as his then-wife Lynne.

According to Curt Smith, "When we made the video in a country estate on the cheap, we bussed all our friends and family up from Bath and had a fun day. The woman who's having the birthday party in the video is my mum."

The music video was directed by Clive Richardson who was notable for his work at that time with Depeche Mode.

== Track listings ==
7-inch: Mercury / IDEA3 (United Kingdom) / 812 213–7 (United States)

1. "Mad World" – 3:32
2. "Ideas as Opiates" – 3:54

7-inch: Mercury / IDEA3 (Ireland) / 6059 568 (Australia, Europe) / TOS 1411 (South Africa)

1. "Mad World" (World Remix) – 3:42
2. "Ideas as Opiates" – 3:54

7-inch double pack: Mercury / IDEA33 (United Kingdom)

1. "Mad World" – 3:32
2. "Mad World" (World Remix) – 3:42
3. "Suffer the Children" (Remix) – 4:15
4. "Ideas as Opiates" – 3:54

12-inch: Mercury / IDEA312 (United Kingdom) / 6400 677 (Europe)

1. "Mad World" – 3:32
2. "Ideas as Opiates" – 3:54
3. "Saxophones as Opiates" – 3:54

== Charts ==
=== Weekly charts ===
| Chart (1982–1983) | Peak position |
|---|---|
| Australia (Kent Music Report) | 12 |
| Ireland (IRMA) | 6 |
| New Zealand (Recorded Music NZ) | 25 |
| South Africa (Springbok Radio) | 2 |
| UK Singles (Official Charts) | 3 |
| West Germany (GfK) | 21 |

=== Year-end charts ===
| Chart (1982) | Position |
|---|---|
| UK Singles (OCC) | 12 |

| Chart (1983) | Position |
|---|---|
| Australia (Kent Music Report) | 93 |

== Certifications ==
Certifications for "Mad World", Tears for Fears version
| Region | Certification | Certified units/sales |
|---|---|---|
| New Zealand (RMNZ) | Gold | 15,000^{‡} |
| United Kingdom (BPI) | Gold | 500,000^{‡} |
^{‡} Sales+streaming figures based on certification alone.

== Michael Andrews and Gary Jules version ==
"Mad World"

Single by Michael Andrews featuring Gary Jules

from the album Donnie Darko and Trading Snakeoil for Wolftickets
- B-side: "No Poetry"
- Released: 15 December 2003
- Recorded: 2000
- Length: 3:04
- Label: Sanctuary
- Songwriter: Roland Orzabal
- Producer: Michael Andrews

"Mad World" achieved a second round of success 20 years after its release, when it was covered by Michael Andrews and Gary Jules for the film Donnie Darko (2001). While the Tears for Fears version featured synthesisers and heavy percussion, the Andrews/Jules version was stripped down; instead of a full musical backing, it used only a set of piano chords, a mellotron imitating a cello, very light touches of electric piano, and modest use of a vocoder on the chorus.

Their version was originally released on CD in 2001 on the Gary Jules album Trading Snakeoil for Wolftickets and again in 2002 for the film's soundtrack along with an additional alternate or remixed version, but an increasing cult following spawned by the film's DVD release finally prompted Jules and Andrews to issue the song as a proper single. It was released through Sanctuary Records on 15 December 2003, in time for the race for the UK's Christmas number one, beating "Christmas Time (Don't Let the Bells End)" by the Darkness to take the title the following week.

This version was used in 2005 as the soundtrack for the opening section of the Season 6 episode "Room Service" of CSI: Crime Scene Investigation.

=== Background ===
For the soundtrack to the film Donnie Darko (2001), director Richard Kelly commissioned Michael Andrews, a San Diego musician and television and film composer who had worked as a member of a range of bands, including the Origin with Gary Jules (whose two solo albums he had produced), and the Greyboy Allstars. Kelly said he was confident that Andrews could do the job: "I met with Michael and I just knew right away that he was really, really talented and that he could come up with a really original score. He would allow me to be in there and be really kind of editorial with how I wanted the score to be." Andrews relocated to Los Angeles to work on the film between October and December 2000. As Andrews states, the low budget for the project encouraged him to play a diverse range of instruments for the soundtrack:

The film was pretty low budget so my portion of the money was pretty thin. I couldn't hire anyone, it was just me. I played everything; piano, mellotron, mini marimba, xylophone, ukulele, organ. I also brought in two female vocalists Sam Shelton and Tori Haberman. But no guitar because Richard said no guitar or drums; he just wasn't into it. I was down with that—I've played guitar my whole life.

Like many of his role models for soundtrack composing (such as John Barry and Ennio Morricone), Andrews wanted to put a song on his otherwise instrumental score. He eventually chose "Mad World", as Tears for Fears were one of his and childhood friend Jules' favourite bands growing up. Andrews enlisted Jules to sing the song, while Andrews himself played the piano; together they recorded the song in an hour and a half.

Despite being critically acclaimed, Donnie Darko was not a commercial success, but it sold very well on DVD and became a cult film, and demand grew for Andrews and Jules' cover of "Mad World" to be released as a proper single. This prompted Andrews to give the song an official release.

Jules said that he believed the song was easy for people to relate to: "I think it's a really beautiful example of a person struggling with the fact that life is mad. I honestly think it's one of the most beautiful songs I have ever heard and the way it's stripped down now just pins people." He went on to say, "Every so often a song with just vocals, piano and cello creeps up on you and says something about who you are, where you're going which stops you in your tracks."

=== Chart performance ===
Despite "Christmas Time (Don't Let the Bells End)" by the Darkness being the bookmakers' favourite to become the 2003 Christmas number one in the UK, "Mad World" upset the odds and took the title on 21 December 2003. It remained at number one on the UK Singles Chart for three consecutive weeks. The song's success in the UK did not, however, translate to the United States, where it reached number 30 on the Billboard Modern Rock Tracks chart in the issue dated 27 March 2004. However, it did reach number 1 on the Adult Alternative Airplay chart for the issue dated April 17, 2004.

Jules performed "Mad World" with Mylène Farmer on her Timeless 2013 Tour. In 2006, the song was included in the commercial for the video game Gears of War, which helped move it up the charts. A performance on the eighth season of American Idol by Adam Lambert also briefly increased its sales and interest in the song. The song reached No. 11 on the Rock Digital Songs chart.

=== Music video ===
The music video was directed by Michel Gondry and was filmed at Hoboken Middle School (formally AJ Demarest School) in Hoboken, New Jersey in 2004. It begins with an aerial shot of the school; the bell rings and children go out onto the pavement. The rest of the video sees the children forming different shapes while Jules stands on the roof and watches from above. On two occasions the camera pans towards Jules looking down at the children, while a third pan away sees Andrews playing a piano as the song ends.

Curt Smith paid tribute to the Jules and Andrews version in April 2020 while staying home under general quarantine orders due to the COVID-19 pandemic. He and his daughter Diva performed an acoustic guitar rendition of "Mad World" using the style of Jules and Andrews, uploading the video to YouTube. Their version went viral, picking up more than a million views in one week, and four million views in the first month.

=== Track listings ===
CD1: Sanctuary / SANXD250 (United Kingdom)

1. "Mad World" – 3:04
2. "No Poetry" – 3:56
3. "Mad World" (alternate version) – 3:39

CD2: Sanctuary / SANXD250X (United Kingdom)

1. "Mad World" (Grayed Out Mix) – 6:45
2. "The Artifact & Living" – 2:30
3. "Mad World" (enhanced video)

=== Charts ===
==== Weekly charts ====
| Chart (2003–2013) | Peak position |
|---|---|
| Australia (ARIA) | 28 |
| Austria (Ö3 Austria Top 40) | 13 |
| Belgium (Ultratop 50 Flanders) | 23 |
| Belgium (Ultratip Bubbling Under Wallonia) | 3 |
| Canada Hot 100 (Billboard) | 93 |
| Denmark (Tracklisten) | 6 |
| Europe (Eurochart Hot 100) | 3 |
| France (SNEP) | 30 |
| French Digital (SNEP) | 11 |
| Germany (GfK) | 3 |
| Ireland (IRMA) | 2 |
| Italy (FIMI) | 19 |
| Netherlands (Dutch Top 40) | 5 |
| Netherlands (Single Top 100) | 4 |
| New Zealand (Recorded Music NZ) | 37 |
| Portugal (Billboard) | 1 |
| Scottish Singles Sales (Official Charts) | 1 |
| Sweden (Sverigetopplistan) | 10 |
| Switzerland (Schweizer Hitparade) | 23 |
| UK Singles (Official Charts) | 1 |
| UK Independent (Official Charts) | 1 |
| UK Rock & Metal (Official Charts) | 3 |
| US Adult Alternative Airplay (Billboard) | 1 |
| US Alternative Airplay (Billboard) | 30 |

==== Year-end charts ====
| Chart (2003) | Position |
|---|---|
| Ireland (IRMA) | 26 |
| UK Singles (OCC) | 4 |

| Chart (2004) | Position |
|---|---|
| Austria (Ö3 Austria Top 40) | 53 |
| Belgium (Ultratop 50 Flanders) | 92 |
| Germany (Media Control GfK) | 14 |
| Netherlands (Dutch Top 40) | 13 |
| Netherlands (Single Top 100) | 20 |
| Sweden (Hitlistan) | 80 |
| UK Singles (OCC) | 29 |
| US Triple-A (Billboard) | 23 |

==== Decade-end charts ====
| Chart (2000–2009) | Position |
|---|---|
| UK Top 100 Songs of the Decade | 53 |

=== Certifications ===
Certifications and sales for "Mad World"
| Region | Certification | Certified units/sales |
|---|---|---|
| Denmark (IFPI Danmark) | Gold | 45,000^{‡} |
| Germany (BVMI) | 3× Gold | 450,000^{‡} |
| Italy (FIMI) | Platinum | 30,000^{‡} |
| New Zealand (RMNZ) | Platinum | 30,000^{‡} |
| Spain (Promusicae) | Gold | 30,000^{‡} |
| United Kingdom (BPI) | Platinum | 699,000 |
^{‡} Sales+streaming figures based on certification alone.

=== Release history ===
| Region | Date | Format(s) | Label(s) | Ref. |
|---|---|---|---|---|
| United Kingdom | 15 December 2003 | 12-inch vinyl; CD | Sanctuary | |
| United States | 17 February 2004 | Triple A; alternative radio | Universal | |
| Australia | 1 March 2004 | CD | Modular | |
| United States | 12 April 2004 | Hot adult contemporary radio | Universal | |
