= Ross Cullum =

British composer, audio engineer, and producer (born 1957)

- Born: 1957 (age 68–69); Fulham, London, England
- Occupations: Composer; record producer; audio engineer

Ross Cullum (born 1957) is an English composer, record producer, and audio engineer, known for working with Enya, Tears for Fears, Moya Brennan, and several other artists.

== Career ==
Cullum became an assistant at George Martin's AIR Studios, where he worked on recordings by Roxy Music and others.

In the 1980s, after touring the world mixing live shows, he formed a production collaboration with Chris Hughes. Together they worked with Adam and the Ants, Wang Chung, Ric Ocasek and others. The duo worked together with Curt Smith and Roland Orzabal of Tears for Fears on The Hurting (1983). In an interview with Wyndham Wallace, Orzabal recalled discussions like "a two-against-two battle throughout the album", with Wallace writing that "it all proved worthwhile." Hughes and Cullum used high-tech production techniques on the Paul McCartney song "Motor of Love", according to Mike Evans, giving it a synthesiser sound, with a "lush backing of electronic effects".

He worked with Enya and Nicky Ryan on her second studio album Watermark (1988). James E. Perone notes that Enya's vocals are bathed in reverb leading to a "hazy and impressionistic" sound. Cullum is mentioned by his first name in the lyrics of "Orinoco Flow".

The Moya Brennan Grammy Award-nominated studio album Two Horizons (2003), which Cullum produced and co-composed, was described by Greg Quill as "an ethereal and juiced-up orchestral concept album"

Other artists he has worked with include Tori Amos, Miguel Bosé, Howard Jones, the Human League, the Afro Celt Sound System, Chris Hughes (Shift – a tribute to Steve Reich), Robert Plant, Perry Blake, Mary-Jess Leaverland, Jana Kirschner, Rufus Wainwright, Zucchero Fornaciari, and Phildel.

== Selected discography ==
- 1983, The Hurting by Tears for Fears
- 1984, Points on the Curve by Wang Chung
- 1988, Watermark by Enya
- 1989, "Motor of Love" from Flowers in the Dirt by Paul McCartney
- 2003, Two Horizons by Moya Brennan
