= Curt Smith =

English singer, songwriter, musician, and record producer (born 1961)

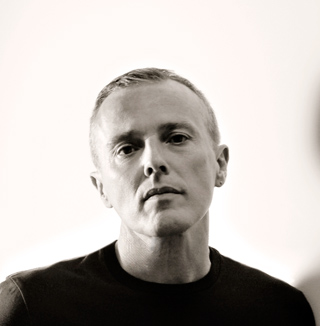
- Smith in 2008

Background information
- Born: 24 June 1961 (age 65); Bath, Somerset, England
- Genres: Pop; pop rock; new wave; mod revival; post-punk; synth-pop
- Occupations: Singer; songwriter; musician; record producer; actor
- Instruments: Vocals; bass guitar; keyboards; guitar
- Years active: 1978–present
- Labels: KOOK Media; Zerodisc; Mercury; XIII BIS
- Member of: Tears for Fears
- Formerly of: Graduate; Neon
- Spouses: Lynda Altman (m. 1982; div. 1988) Frances Pennington (m. 1996)

Curt Smith (born 24 June 1961) is an English singer, songwriter, musician, and record producer. He is best known as the co-lead vocalist, bassist, and co-founder of the pop rock band Tears for Fears with childhood friend Roland Orzabal. Smith has co-written several of the band's songs and performed lead vocals on "Mad World", "Pale Shelter", "Change", "The Way You Are", "Everybody Wants to Rule the World", and "Advice for the Young at Heart".

After leaving Tears for Fears in 1991, Smith released his debut solo studio album, Soul on Board, in 1993. He later formed the band Mayfield and released further solo recordings, alongside making appearances in film and television. He rejoined Tears for Fears in 2000.

== Early life ==
Smith grew up in Bath, Somerset, and lived on the Snow Hill council estate. He attended the Beechen Cliff School. As a teenager, Smith was drawn to punk and ska music, and later to artists including Peter Gabriel, David Bowie and Talking Heads.

== Career ==
=== Graduate ===
Smith met Roland Orzabal when both were teenagers. They played together in a band at around age 14, with Smith as lead singer and Orzabal later taught Smith how to play bass guitar. Orzabal went on to form the ska-influenced band Graduate, which Smith joined as bassist. Graduate released their sole studio album Acting My Age, in 1980. The band also achieved some chart success in Spain. Around this time, Smith and Orzabal also became session musicians for the band Neon alongside Pete Byrne and Rob Fisher, who later formed Naked Eyes.

=== Tears for Fears ===
After leaving Graduate, Smith and Orzabal formed Tears for Fears in 1981. Smith plays bass guitar and shares lead vocal duties with Orzabal. Their debut studio album, 1983's The Hurting, reached number one on the UK Albums Chart. The album featured three international hit singles, "Mad World", "Change" and "Pale Shelter", all of which reached the UK top five and featured Smith on lead vocals.

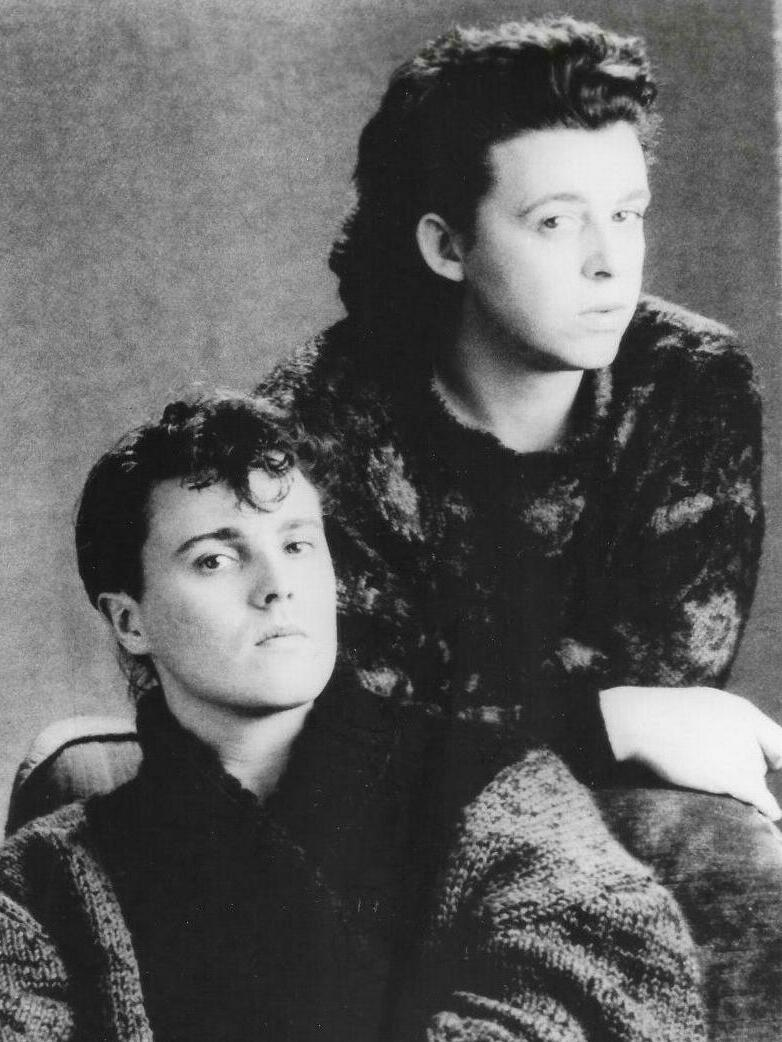
Smith And Orzabal in 1985

The duo's second studio album Songs from the Big Chair (1985), topped the US Billboard 200 for five weeks and went multi-platinum. The album yielded several hit singles, including "Everybody Wants to Rule the World", featuring Smith on lead vocals, "Shout", and "Head Over Heels", which Smith co-wrote with Orzabal. Smith also performed "Everybody Wants to Rule the World" at the Nelson Mandela 70th Birthday Tribute at Wembley Stadium in 1988.

Their third studio album, The Seeds of Love (1989), topped the UK Albums Chart and reached number eight on the US Billboard 200. Smith's only lead vocal on the album was "Advice for the Young at Heart". Amid growing tensions with Orzabal, Smith left Tears for Fears in 1991 and moved to New York. Around 2000, Smith and Orzabal renewed contact over business matters relating to Tears for Fears, following almost 10 years of estrangement. The two subsequently reunited and worked with Smith's associate Charlton Pettus on Everybody Loves a Happy Ending, which was released in 2004.

In 2001, a cover of "Mad World" was re-recorded by Michael Andrews and Gary Jules for the soundtrack of the film Donnie Darko. A 2003 single release of the song reached number one on the UK singles chart for three consecutive weeks, and in 2004 Orzabal received an Ivor Novello Award for Best Selling UK Single. The cover's success re-ignited interest in Tears for Fears' earlier recordings. Their 1992 greatest hits compilation, Tears Roll Down (Greatest Hits 82–92), returned to the UK Albums Chart in 2004, reaching number six, and was certified double platinum in the UK.

Tears for Fears toured with Hall & Oates in 2017, with Smith describing their live performances as less rigid than during the 1980s. In 2021, Smith and Roland Orzabal were honoured with the Ivor Novello Award for Outstanding Song Collection. Tears for Fears released their seventh studio album, The Tipping Point, in February 2022. The band toured in support of the album that year. The album included contributions from longtime collaborator Charlton Pettus.

In October 2024, Tears for Fears released Songs for a Nervous Planet, a live album featuring four new studio tracks, alongside the concert film Tears for Fears Live (A Tipping Point Film), recorded during their 2023 tour. The album reached number six on the UK Albums Chart. Tears for Fears also performed a series of residency shows at the BleauLive Theater at Fontainebleau Las Vegas during 2024 and 2025.

=== Solo career ===
After leaving Tears for Fears, Smith released his debut solo studio album, Soul on Board, in 1993. The album was available in the United States only as an import. Smith later claimed that he recorded the album because he remained under contract after leaving the band and was not ready to make a solo record.

After moving to New York, Smith began writing songs with guitarist-producer Charlton Pettus and formed the band Mayfield. Smith handled bass and vocals, while Russ Irwin and Doug Petty played keyboards and Shawn Pelton played drums. According to Smith, the name of the band was a play on words of soul singer Curtis Mayfield, using the phrase "Curt is Mayfield". Mayfield regularly performed at New York clubs and released a self-titled studio album in 1998.

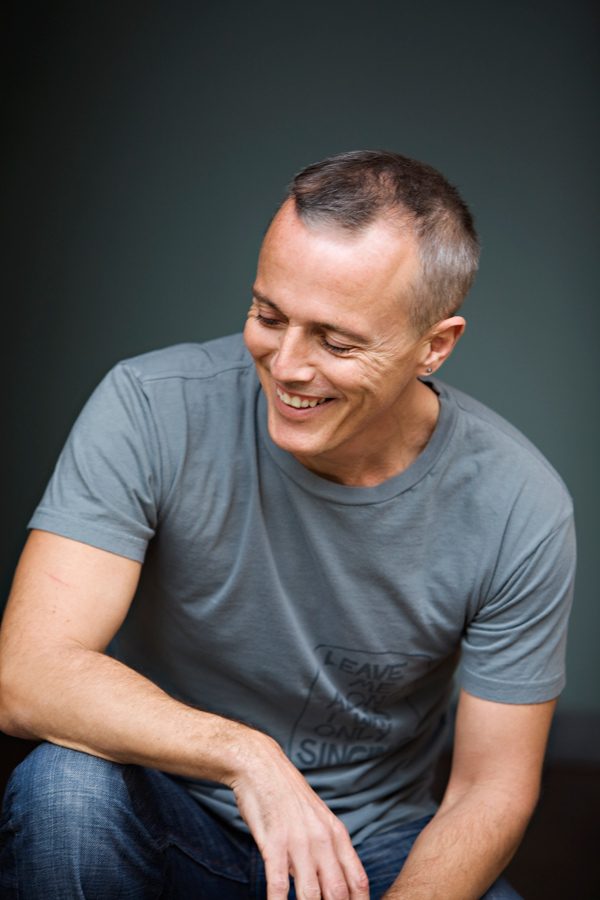
Smith in 2008

Smith later released the solo studio album Aeroplane under his own name, with a 14-track album issued in Canada in 1999 and a six-track EP following in 2000. Smith began writing songs for Halfway, Pleased in 1999, but put the project on hold after agreeing to record another Tears for Fears album with Orzabal in 2000.

In 2005, Smith contributed guest vocals to "The Day We Died", a track from American Eyes' EP Never Trust Anything That Bleeds. In 2006, Smith and Pettus resumed work on Halfway, Pleased, a semi-autobiographical album exploring Smith's relationships with his children, parents and friends. He released the album independently in May 2008 through his KOOK Media label. The album also included a duet with French singer So (Sophie Saillet) on a version of "Seven of Sundays".

In January 2010, Smith released the standalone single "All Is Love", featuring Zoë Keating, a contemporary classical cellist he had discovered through Twitter, and began pursuing further collaborations with artists he met online. The second collaboration, "Perfectly...Still", featuring Universal Hall Pass, was released in August that same year. Also in 2010, Smith hosted Stripped Down Live with Curt Smith, a live-streamed music web series featuring acoustic performances and interviews with guest artists. Later that year, his song "This Is Christmas" was featured in an episode of Psych.

Smith reissued Mayfield's self-titled album through KOOK media in November 2011, including a newly recorded bonus version of the song "Trees" featuring Janice Whaley. Smith is also featured on The Shadow Bureau's 2011 track "Don't Give Yourself Away" with artist Linda Strawberry, inspired by the 2010 Australian film Griff the Invisible. He also contributed vocals to "When Is Enough Not Enough", a track from Junkie XL's 2012 studio album Synthesized.

Smith released his solo album Deceptively Heavy on 16 July 2013, and worked with longtime collaborator Charlton Pettus to compose the score for the 2013 film Meth Head, starring Lukas Haas. They also worked together to compose the score for the 2015 film Gravy. In September 2016, Smith joined drummer Jamie Wollam and hammered dulcimer player Ted Yoder for a performance of "Everybody Wants to Rule the World" at Yoder's home.

=== Acting and other ventures ===
Smith has spoken at events about music and social media, including the 2008 Creative Commons Los Angeles Salon and the 2009 Twitter conference. His other speaking engagements have included TEDxHollywood, TEDxSF and USC Annenberg's Online Communities programme.

Smith also appeared in the 1994 film Dead Connection (aka Final Combination) and played Professor Nick Powell in The Private Public (2001). He made a surprise appearance at the San Diego Comic-Con in July 2010, performing "Shout" with James Roday and Dulé Hill during a panel for the television series Psych. Smith subsequently appeared as himself in the September 2010 episode "Shawn 2.0", for which he also recorded his own variation of the show's opening theme. He returned as himself in the show's 100th episode, "100 Clues", which aired in March 2013, and again in the series' penultimate episode "A Nightmare on State Street", in March 2014. Smith later returned to the franchise in the 2021 television film Psych 3: This Is Gus, again appearing as himself.

In September 2026, Smith joined an investment group that acquired ownership of Bath City F.C., becoming a club ambassador.

== Personal life ==
Smith was married to Lynda "Lynne" Altman during the 1980s. Following the end of his first marriage, Smith met marketing executive Frances Pennington in New York. They married around 1996 and have two daughters. He has lived in Los Angeles since the late 1990s and became a naturalized U.S. citizen in 2007.

== Equipment ==
Smith favoured a Steinberger bass for live performances in the 1980s, although by 1985 he was also using a Status bass. He later used a custom made Duesenberg bass designed to replace a Höfner instrument he had previously played. Smith's instruments have also been documented by contributors to the community-maintained music equipment database Equipboard.

== Discography ==
Year	Title	Release	Ref
1993	Soul on Board	Solo studio album	
1998	Mayfield	Studio album by Mayfield	
1999	Aeroplane	Solo studio album (Canadian release)	
2000	Aeroplane	Six-track EP	
2008	Halfway, Pleased	Solo studio album (internationally released in 2008)	
2013	Deceptively Heavy	Solo studio album	
