= Roland Orzabal =

English musician, singer-songwriter, and record producer (born 1961)

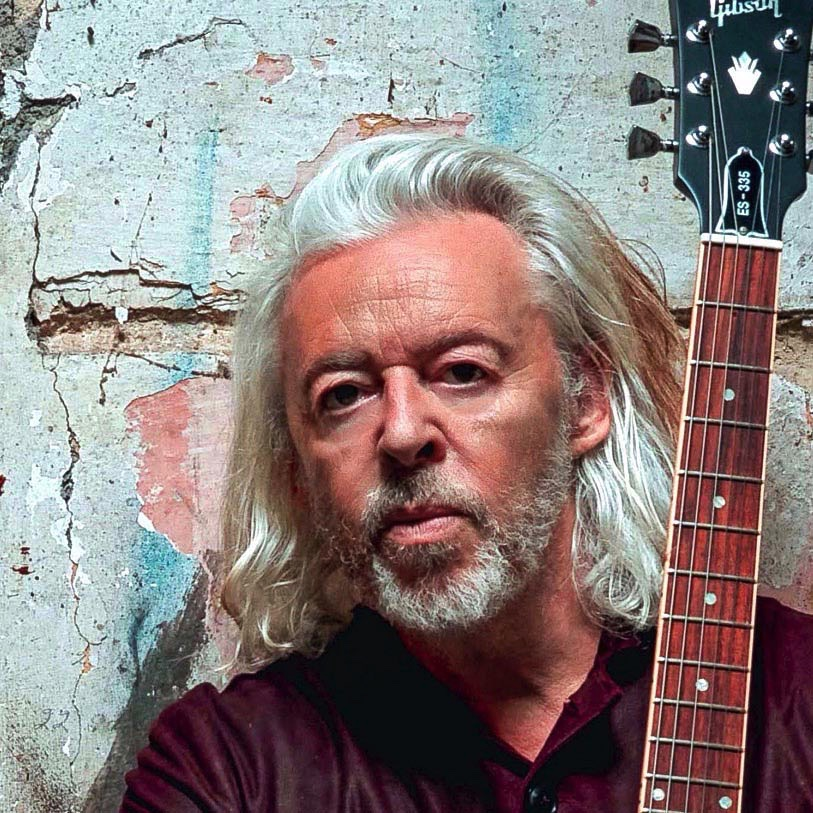
- Orzabal in 2020

Background information
- Born: Roland Jaime Orzábal De La Quintana; 22 August 1961 (age 65); Portsmouth, England
- Origin: Bath, Somerset, England
- Genres: New wave; pop rock; synth-pop
- Occupations: Musician; singer; songwriter; record producer; author
- Instruments: Vocals; guitar; keyboards
- Years active: 1978−present
- Labels: Mercury; Eagle; Epic; Concord
- Member of: Tears for Fears
- Formerly of: Graduate; Neon
- Spouses: Caroline Johnston (m. 1982; died 2017) Emily Rath (m. 2020)

Roland Jaime Orzábal De La Quintana (born 22 August 1961) is an English musician, singer, songwriter, record producer, and author. He is the guitarist, co-lead vocalist, principal songwriter, co-founder, and only constant member of Tears for Fears. He is also a producer of artists such as Oleta Adams. In 2014, Orzabal published his first novel, Sex, Drugs & Opera, a romantic comedy.

== Early life ==
Roland Jaime Orzábal De La Quintana was born on 22 August 1961 in Portsmouth, Hampshire. He was initially raised in nearby Havant. Orzabal's father, George Orzabal de la Quintana, was a Frenchman of Argentine and Basque/Spanish roots and was often so ill that he was rarely seen by his children. Orzabal wrote his first songs when he was seven years old. The family later moved to Bath, Somerset, where he attended Culverhay School (later Bath Community Academy) and became a member of the Zenith Youth Theatre Company.

== Career ==
=== Early career ===
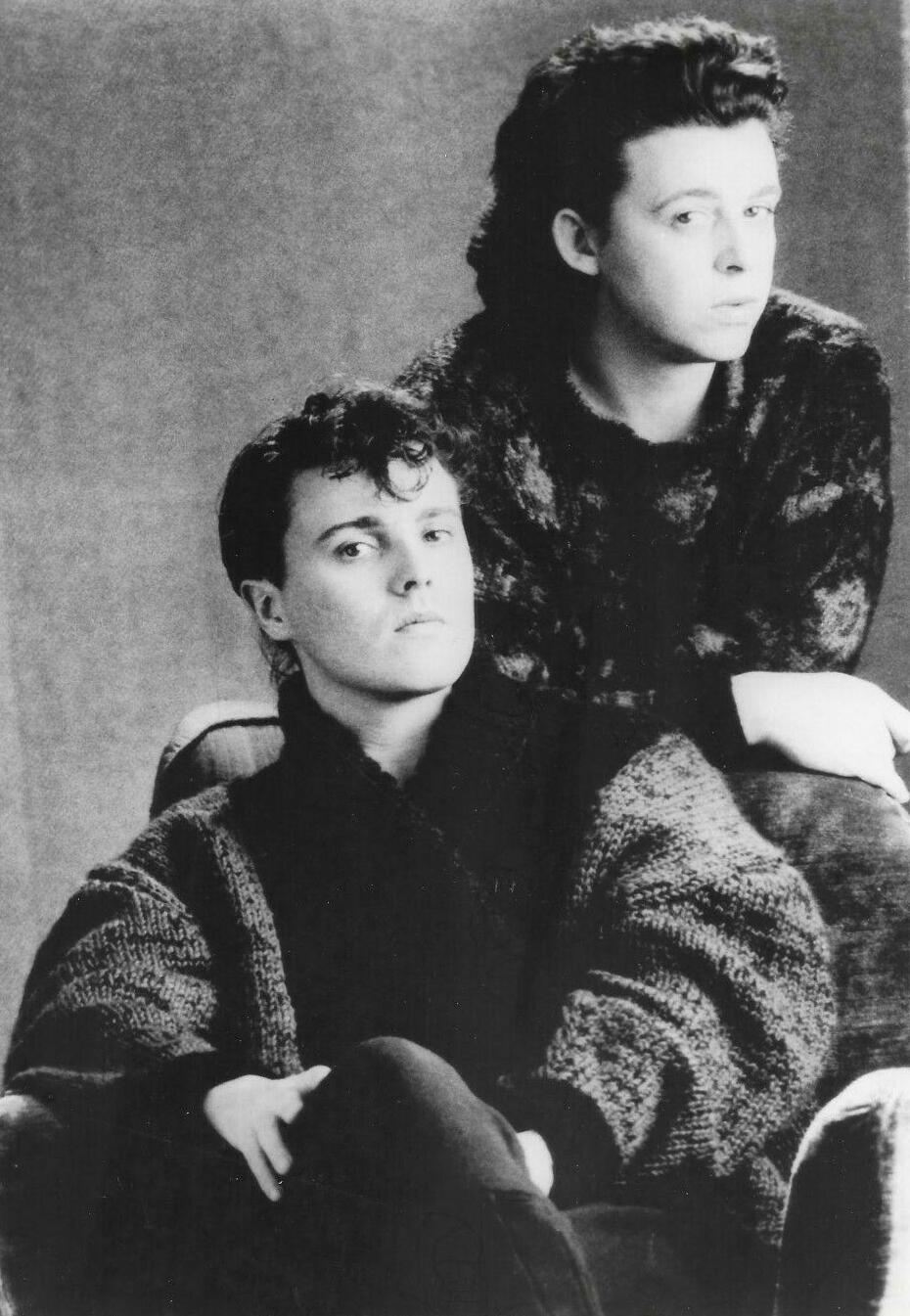
Roland Orzabal is seen here with Curt Smith in 1985 in a publicity photo.

Orzabal met Curt Smith while both were in their early teens in Bath. In the late 1970s, they formed a mod revival musical group, Graduate, along with three other members. Following the release of their debut studio album, Acting My Age (1980), the group disbanded. Orzabal and Smith briefly joined Neon and then went on to form Tears for Fears, a new wave and synth-pop outfit directly inspired by the work of the American psychologist, psychotherapist, and writer Arthur Janov. Orzabal sings and plays guitar for the band, while Smith sings and plays bass guitar. Orzabal is also the band's main songwriter.

The band's debut studio album, The Hurting (1983), reached number-one on the UK Albums Chart. Their second studio album, Songs from the Big Chair (1985), reached number-one on the US Billboard 200, achieving multi-platinum status in both the UK and the US. Songs from the Big Chair included two Billboard Hot 100 number-one hits: "Shout" and "Everybody Wants to Rule the World".

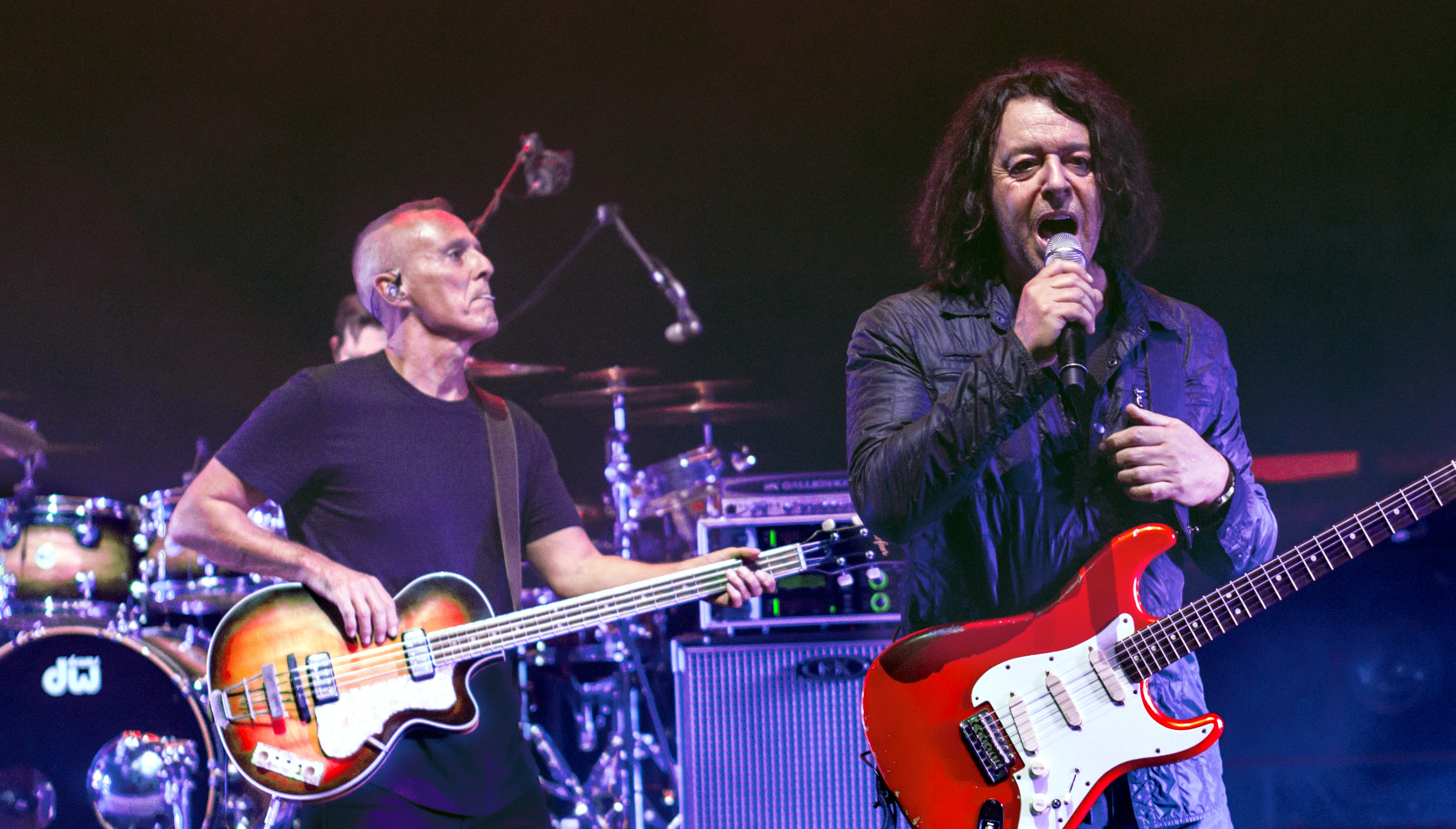
Tears for Fears performing live in 2017

After the release of their third studio album, The Seeds of Love (1989), Smith and Orzabal split in 1991. Orzabal continued recording under the Tears for Fears name, releasing the studio albums Elemental (1993) and Raoul and the Kings of Spain (1995). As Tears for Fears, Orzabal and Smith released Everybody Loves a Happy Ending in 2004. After almost a decade in development, the band's seventh studio album, The Tipping Point, was released in February 2022.

=== Solo work ===
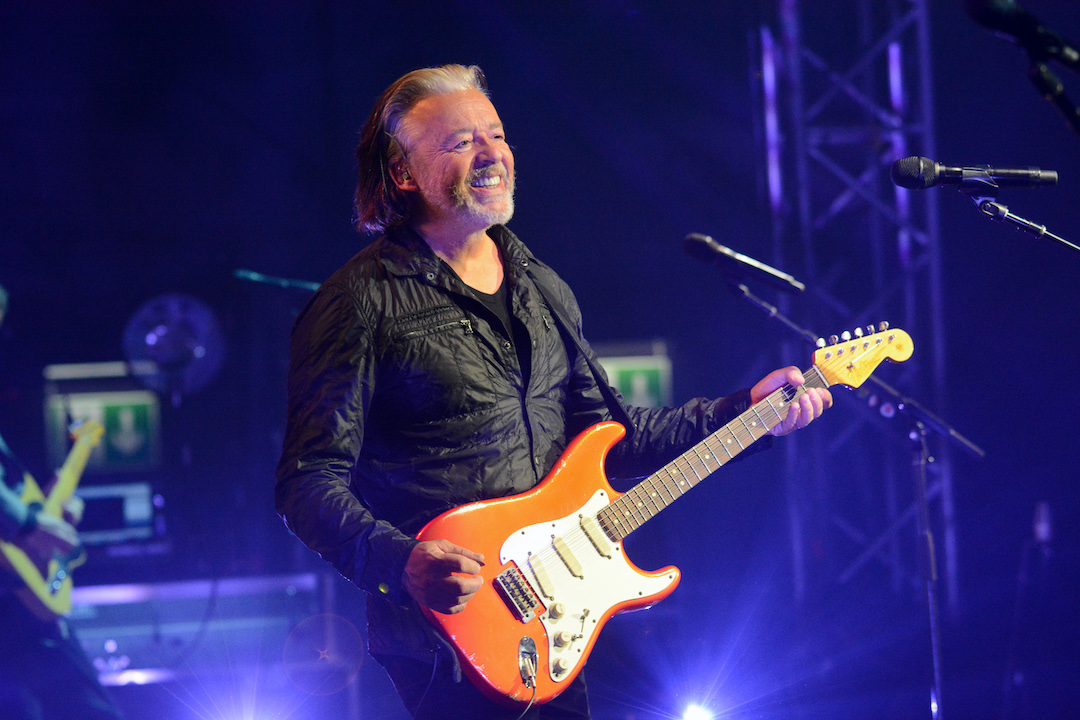
Orzabal performing live at the Tollwood Festival at the Olympiapark in Munich, Germany, 2019

In 2001, Orzabal released his debut solo studio album, Tomcats Screaming Outside, under his own name.

=== Work as a record producer and songwriter ===
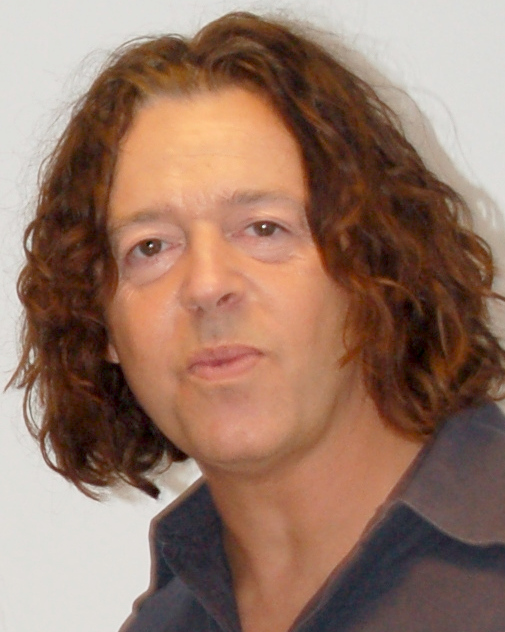
Orzabal in 2007

As a songwriter, Orzabal is a three-time Ivor Novello Award winner. His first award was in 1986 for "Songwriter of the Year" following the release of Tears for Fears' second studio album Songs from the Big Chair (1985).

Orzabal and Smith were responsible for discovering the American singer, pianist, and songwriter Oleta Adams, whom they invited to collaborate on their third studio album The Seeds of Love (1989). Adams appeared on several tracks on the album, most notably the hit single "Woman in Chains", which she performed as a duet with Orzabal. Orzabal then co-produced Adams' third studio album Circle of One (1990). The album reached No. 1 in the UK and No. 20 in the US, and featured her transatlantic top ten hit "Get Here". Orzabal also co-wrote the lead track "Rhythm of Life" for the album, which was originally intended for The Seeds of Love. As well as playing guitar and singing backing vocals on the track, he also appeared in the song's accompanying music video.

In 1999, Orzabal co-produced Icelandic singer and songwriter Emilíana Torrini's third studio album Love in the Time of Science, along with Tears for Fears' associate Alan Griffiths. The pair also wrote two tracks for the album.

Orzabal wrote the song "Mad World", covered by Michael Andrews and Gary Jules for the film soundtrack Donnie Darko in 2001. Their version was released as a single in 2003 and became the Christmas number-one single in the UK that year, ultimately becoming the year's biggest-selling single. The song was originally composed by Orzabal and was Tears for Fears' first hit single in 1982. In 2004, the song won Orzabal his second Ivor Novello Award; he was awarded as the songwriter of the Best Selling UK Single of 2003. In September 2021, Orzabal was awarded his third Ivor Novello Award along with Curt Smith for the Outstanding Song Collection by Tears for Fears.

=== Books ===
Orzabal wrote a novel, a romantic comedy entitled Sex, Drugs & Opera, published in 2014. It tells the story of a middle-aged pop star, Solomon Capri, who is semi-retired but is approached to take part in the British television programme Popstar to Operastar. Capri sees the show as a way to rejuvenate his career and his waning marriage. The story was inspired by Orzabal's own experience; he was approached by the ITV show himself, though did not take part.

Orzabal's memoir, Welcome to Your Life: Love, Death and Tears For Fears, was published on August 4, 2026.

== Personal life ==
=== Relationships ===
In 1982, Orzabal married Caroline Johnston, whom he had been dating since his teenage years. Caroline sang the child vocal on the Tears for Fears song "Suffer the Children" from the band's debut studio album The Hurting (1983), and also drew the hands cover artwork for the 1983 re-release of "Pale Shelter". Roland and Caroline Orzabal had two sons. Caroline Orzabal died in July 2017 aged 54 after suffering from alcoholism-related dementia and cirrhosis, which came about after being diagnosed with depression. Her death led the band to cancel its remaining tour dates that year.

In 2020, Orzabal married Emily Rath, a photographer and writer, in Aspen, Colorado, United States, and had a child in June 2025.

=== Politics ===
After Margaret Thatcher's continued tenure as the Prime Minister of the United Kingdom in June 1987, Orzabal took an interest in socialism in response to her attitude towards the working class. His feelings on Thatcherism were reflected in the lyrics of "Sowing the Seeds of Love": "Politician granny with your high ideals / Have you no idea how the majority feels?".

== Discography ==
=== Solo albums ===
- Tomcats Screaming Outside (2001)

=== with Graduate ===
- Acting My Age (1980)

=== with Tears for Fears ===
- The Hurting (1983)
- Songs from the Big Chair (1985)
- The Seeds of Love (1989)
- Elemental (1993)
- Raoul and the Kings of Spain (1995)
- Everybody Loves a Happy Ending (2004)
- The Tipping Point (2022)
- Songs for a Nervous Planet (2024)
