= Scenes from the Big Chair =

- 1985 VHS cover

Video by Tears for Fears
- Released: November 1985
- Recorded: 1984–1985
- Length: 75 minutes
- Label: Phonogram
- Director: Nigel Dick
- Producers: Nigel Dick; Sarah de V.Wills; Tony Powell; David Bates

Tears for Fears chronology
In My Mind's Eye (1984)	Scenes from the Big Chair (1985)	Sowing the Seeds (1990)

DVD cover
- 2005 DVD cover

Scenes from the Big Chair is a documentary film about the English new wave band Tears for Fears. Released on home video in November 1985, the 75 minute documentary was made at the height of the band's global success following the release of their multi-platinum selling second studio album Songs from the Big Chair.

The documentary was made by renowned music video and film director Nigel Dick, who had already made several promo videos with the band including their hits "Shout", "Everybody Wants to Rule the World", and "Head over Heels". Filmed in England, Germany, Canada and the United States, it includes a variety of interviews with band members Roland Orzabal, Curt Smith, Ian Stanley and Manny Elias, footage from the band's 1985 "Big Chair" tour (both onstage and off), a segment where the band filmed a promotional appearance for Japanese television at Blenheim Palace in Woodstock, Oxfordshire, England, and clips from the promotional music videos for the five singles released from the album (including the second promo video of the single "Mothers Talk" and also a brief behind the scenes look at making the "Head Over Heels" video).

Scenes from the Big Chair was also released on LaserDisc and the short-lived Video CD format. It was released on DVD in 2005, twenty years after its initial home video release. In addition to the documentary, the DVD also contains a new 35 minute interview with record producer Chris Hughes, recorded in 2005, as he reflects on the making of the album and its subsequent global success. The non-US/Canadian releases also contain the 90 minute Going to California concert performance which was recorded in Santa Barbara during the band's Seeds of Love World Tour in May 1990 (also directed by Nigel Dick and also previously available on home video).

It was reissued on DVD in 2014 as part of the 6-disc Super Deluxe Edition of Songs from the Big Chair. This version also contains the 2005 interview with Chris Hughes, but does not include the 1990 Going to California concert.

Unlike the original VHS, LaserDisc and Video CD releases, the audio tracks for the DVD releases are available in 5.1 surround sound as well as 2.0 stereo.

== Track listing ==
- "Broken"
- "Everybody Wants to Rule the World" (promo)
- "Shout" (live)
- "Listen"
- "Head Over Heels" (promo)
- "Broken" (live/reprise)
- "Memories Fade" (live)
- "The Hurting" (live)
- "Mothers Talk" (promo)
- "I Believe" (promo)
- "The Working Hour" (live)
- "Everybody Wants to Rule the World" (live)
- "Shout" (promo)
- "Listen" (end credits)

Music produced by Chris Hughes.

=== DVD track listing ===
As above and also features a 2005 interview with producer Chris Hughes and the non-US/Canadian versions include the 1990 Going to California concert video.
