= Mothers Talk =

1984 single by Tears for Fears

Single by Tears for Fears

from the album Songs from the Big Chair
- B-side: "Empire Building" (UK); "Sea Song" (US)
- Released: 10 August 1984 (UK); 1 April 1986 (US)
- Recorded: 1984 (original); 1986 (US remix)
- Genre: New wave; electronic
- Length: 5:09 (album version); 3:53 (single version); 4:14 (US remix version)
- Label: Phonogram; Mercury
- Songwriters: Roland Orzabal; Ian Stanley
- Producer: Chris Hughes

Tears for Fears singles chronology
"The Way You Are" (1983)	"Mothers Talk" (1984)	"Shout" (1984)
"Everybody Wants to Run the World" (1986)	"Mothers Talk [US remix]" (1986)	"Sowing the Seeds of Love" (1989)

"Mothers Talk" is a 1984 song by the English new wave band Tears for Fears. Written by Roland Orzabal and Ian Stanley and sung by Orzabal, it was the band's seventh single release (the first to be taken from their second album Songs from the Big Chair (1985) and fifth UK Top 40 chart hit. The song was released six months in advance of the album, and enjoyed moderate success internationally.

Orzabal notes that while "Mothers Talk" helped move the band in a new creative direction, he does not like the track. Producer Chris Hughes considers it important to the band's development, although he and engineer Dave Bascombe agree that the song is not one of Orzabal's best.

== Background ==
This was a taster for Songs from the Big Chair, the second album, on which we unashamedly tried to become more commercial. I was against it, but I was swayed by some of the people that I was working with. They wanted to come out all guns blazing, but I wasn't ready for that. It was from this point, though, that things really started to explode.

— Roland Orzabal

"Mothers Talk" was written in 1983 and was first publicly performed during the band's late 1983 tour. Orzabal describes it as an unsuccessful attempt to mimic the sound of Talking Heads. In early 1984, the band went into the studio and recorded it as their next single with Jeremy Green as producer; Orzabal found this version to be "incredibly crafted and interesting" with a drum pattern resembling "Teen Town" by Weather Report, but the record company disliked it. The band's previous producer, Chris Hughes, was then brought back into the fold and the song was re-recorded and finally released as a single in August 1984. Hughes stayed on with the band to record their second album, Songs from the Big Chair.

Along with its B-side, "Empire Building", "Mothers Talk" was one of the first Tears for Fears songs to demonstrate a creative use of sampling. The strings at the beginning of the song were culled from a Barry Manilow record, while the drum sample around which "Empire Building" is built was lifted from the Simple Minds song "Today I Died Again". This was the second Tears for Fears single for which Phonogram would use the picture disc and coloured vinyl gimmicks as a promotional tool, as well as the first one to feature multiple 12" releases offering different remixes of the track. Limited quantities of the 7" single also came with a free Tears for Fears window sticker of the band's new logo.

== Meaning ==
The song stems from two ideas. One is something that mothers say to their children about pulling faces. They say the child will stay like that when the wind changes. The other idea is inspired by the anti-nuclear cartoon book When the Wind Blows by Raymond Briggs.

— Roland Orzabal

== US release ==
While North America saw "Everybody Wants to Rule the World" as the first single release from the Songs from the Big Chair LP, "Mothers Talk" was eventually released there as the fourth and final single from the album in April 1986, peaking at no. 27 on the Billboard Hot 100. Although labeled as a "remix", this version of the song is actually a complete re-recording, done by the band after their Big Chair tour wrapped up. It was mixed by the award-winning producer Bob Clearmountain, who would go on to mix the band's next album with them.

In addition to a different picture sleeve, the single featured the band's cover of Robert Wyatt's "Sea Song" as the B-side (this had been released as the B-side to the single "I Believe" in other countries in 1985). This version was also released in Canada and Japan at the same time.

Cash Box said that the single "features classic TFF synth moorings but a much grittier overall approach." Billboard said that the US remix was "fleshed out, toughened up, and generally transformed from the less flashy LP version."

== Music videos ==
Three separate promotional clips were filmed for the song in total. The original version, directed by photographer Laurie Lewis, was a performance clip set in a blue toned room and interspersed with shots of a young girl being studied by scientists. The band disliked this version and quickly disowned it, although it had already aired on various British television shows by this point. A replacement video (directed by Nigel Dick) was then filmed on a shoestring budget, featuring the duo in a rural location (some of which was filmed in Curt Smith's back garden) and interspersed with news and sports footage from a TV set. Both clips were released to UK and European markets in mid-1984. The third and final video, again directed by Nigel Dick, was made for the "US Remix" of the song in early 1986 and portrayed a family preparing a bomb shelter for nuclear fallout, in keeping with the theme of Raymond Briggs' graphic novel When the Wind Blows. An extended mix of the song, featuring an extra verse at the beginning, was exclusive to this video until it was issued as a bonus track on the 2015 deluxe reissue of Songs from the Big Chair.

== Track listings ==
7": Mercury / IDEA7 (United Kingdom, Ireland, South Africa) / 818 838-7 (Australia, Europe) / 7PP-155 (Japan)

1. "Mothers Talk" (3:53)
2. "Empire Building" (2:49)

7": Mercury / 884 638-7 (United States, Australia, Europe) / SOV 2366 (Canada) / 7PP-200 (Japan)

1. "Mothers Talk (US Remix)" (4:14)
2. "Sea Song" (3:52)

12": Mercury / IDEA712 (United Kingdom) / 818 838-1 (Europe)

1. "Mothers Talk (Extended Version)" (6:15)
2. "Empire Building" (2:49)

12": Mercury / IDEAR712 (United Kingdom) / 880 248-1 (Australia) / 880 258-1 (Europe)

1. "Mothers Talk (Beat of the Drum Mix)" (8:54)
2. "Empire Building" (2:49)

12": Vertigo / TFF1 (Canada)

1. "Mothers Talk (Short Version)" (3:53)
2. "The Way You Are (Extended Version)" (7:33)
3. "Mothers Talk (Beat of the Drum Mix)" (8:54)
4. "The Marauders" (4:14)
5. "Mothers Talk" (Extended Version) (6:15)

CS: Vertigo / TFF 4 1 (Canada)

1. "Mothers Talk (Beat of the Drum Mix)" (8:54)
2. "The Marauders" (4:14)
3. "Mothers Talk (Extended Version)" (6:15)
4. "Mothers Talk" (3:53)
5. "The Way You Are (Extended Version)" (7:33)

12": Mercury / 884 638-1 (United States, Europe)

1. "Mothers Talk (Beat of the Drum Mix)" (8:54)
2. "Mothers Talk (Extended Version)" (6:15)
3. "Mothers Talk (US Remix)" (4:14)

12": Vertigo / SOVX 2366 (Canada)

1. "Mothers Talk (Beat of the Drum Mix)" (8:54)
2. "Mothers Talk (US Remix)" (4:14)
3. "Sea Song" (3:52)

== Personnel ==
Tears for Fears

- Roland Orzabal – lead and background vocals, guitar, keyboard
- Curt Smith – bass guitar, background vocals
- Ian Stanley – keyboards
- Manny Elias – drums

Additional musicians

- Stevie Lange, Ruby James, Nicky Holland, Katie Kissoon, Bernita Turner (US remix) – background vocals
- Mel Collins – saxophone (US remix)

== Chart positions ==
Chart (1984)	Peak position
Europe (European Hot 100 Singles)	45
Ireland (IRMA)	23
UK Singles (Official Charts)	14

Chart (1985)	Peak position
New Zealand (Recorded Music NZ)	50

Chart (1986)	Peak position
Canada Top Singles (RPM)	87
US Billboard Hot 100	27
US Cash Box	25
