= Nicky Holland =

English musician and singer-songwriter (born 1959)

- Born: 20 February 1959 (age 67)
- Origin: Hertfordshire, England
- Genres: Pop rock; new wave; pop
- Occupations: Musician; songwriter; vocalist
- Instruments: Piano; keyboards
- Years active: 1981–present
- Labels: Phonogram; Fontana; Epic

Nicky Holland (born 20 February 1959) is an English musician and singer-songwriter, notable for being a previous backing pianist/keyboardist, vocalist and co-songwriter for the band Tears for Fears during the 1980s.

== Early life ==
Nicky Holland began studying piano at a young age; while attending the Royal Academy of Music, she grew inspired by the music of Carole King.

== Career ==
After graduating, Holland proceeded with her studies at the City University in London, England. There, she met classmates Virginia Astley and Kate St John, who she soon formed the band The Ravishing Beauties with in 1981. The trio played in numerous clubs, gaining association with Julian Cope and the Teardrop Explodes, and later supported them on their tours. They also recorded with Echo & the Bunnymen, Skids, and Siouxsie and the Banshees. In 1982, she went on to support Fun Boy Three, becoming their musical director and performing on their album Waiting.

Around a year later, she joined the Escape, a band that opened for Tears for Fears on their tour for their debut album The Hurting in 1983. After the Escape broke up, Nicky Holland was offered the chance to support Tears for Fears on their world tour in 1985, circulating the release of their hit album Songs from the Big Chair.

During her time with Tears for Fears, she appeared in the music video for "Head over Heels", and in the band's 1985 documentary Scenes from the Big Chair. Her piano playing is featured in their cover of "Sea Song" by Robert Wyatt, which served as a B-side to the single for "I Believe (A Soulful Re-recording)". She continued working with the group through 1987, being credited as co-writer for most of the band's third album The Seeds of Love as well as a pianist and backing vocalist.

After moving to New York City in the late '80s, Holland signed on to the record label Epic in 1990, and spent the next year writing, recording and mixing her debut solo album Nicky Holland, which was released in 1991. Throughout the 1990s, she supported several musical artists. In 1993, she was a featured pianist in Cyndi Lauper's album Hat Full of Stars. She released her second album Sense and Sensuality in 1997.

She resumed her career in 2010. Within the next few years, Holland co-wrote songs with a variety of artists such as Nick Howard and Peter Plate. In 2017, she released a compilation album titled Nobody's Girl, which featured songs from her two previous albums.
