= Laurie Lewis (disambiguation) =

Laurie Lewis (born 1950) is an American musician.

Laurie Lewis may also refer to:

- Laurie Lewis (volleyball) (born 1949), American volleyball player
- Laurie Lewis (photographer) (born 1944), British photographer
- Laurie Beebe Lewis (born 1954), American singer-songwriter
