= List of Cash Box Top 100 number-one singles of 1985 =

These are the singles that reached number one on the Top 100 Singles chart in 1985 as published by Cashbox magazine.

Key
†	Indicates best-performing single of 1985

Issue date	Song	Artist
January 5	"Like a Virgin"	Madonna
January 12	"Like a Virgin"	Madonna
January 19	"Like a Virgin"	Madonna
January 26	"Like a Virgin"	Madonna
February 2	"I Want to Know What Love Is"	Foreigner
February 9	"Easy Lover"	Philip Bailey and Phil Collins
February 16	"Careless Whisper"	Wham! featuring George Michael
February 23	"Careless Whisper"	Wham! featuring George Michael
March 2	"Careless Whisper"	Wham! featuring George Michael
March 9	"Can't Fight This Feeling"	REO Speedwagon
March 16	"Can't Fight This Feeling"	REO Speedwagon
March 23	"Can't Fight This Feeling"	REO Speedwagon
March 30	"Material Girl"	Madonna
April 6	"One More Night"	Phil Collins
April 13	"We Are the World" †	USA for Africa
April 20	"We Are the World" †	USA for Africa
April 27	"We Are the World" †	USA for Africa
May 4	"We Are the World" †	USA for Africa
May 11	"We Are the World" †	USA for Africa
May 18	"Don't You (Forget About Me)"	Simple Minds
May 25	"Don't You (Forget About Me)"	Simple Minds
June 1	"Everything She Wants"	Wham!
June 8	"Everybody Wants to Rule the World"	Tears for Fears
June 15	"Everybody Wants to Rule the World"	Tears for Fears
June 22	"Heaven"	Bryan Adams
June 29	"Sussudio"	Phil Collins
July 6	"Sussudio"	Phil Collins
July 13	"A View to a Kill"	Duran Duran
July 20	"Raspberry Beret"	Prince and The Revolution
July 27	"Everytime You Go Away"	Paul Young
August 3	"Everytime You Go Away"	Paul Young
August 10	"Shout"	Tears for Fears
August 17	"Shout"	Tears for Fears
August 24	"The Power of Love"	Huey Lewis and the News
August 31	"The Power of Love"	Huey Lewis and the News
September 7	"St. Elmo's Fire (Man in Motion)"	John Parr
September 14	"St. Elmo's Fire (Man in Motion)"	John Parr
September 21	"Money for Nothing"	Dire Straits
September 28	"Money for Nothing"	Dire Straits
October 5	"Money for Nothing"	Dire Straits
October 12	"Money for Nothing"	Dire Straits
October 19	"Take On Me"	a-ha
October 26	"Take On Me"	a-ha
November 2	"Part-Time Lover"	Stevie Wonder
November 9	"Miami Vice Theme"	Jan Hammer
November 16	"We Built This City"	Starship
November 23	"We Built This City"	Starship
November 30	"Separate Lives"	Phil Collins and Marilyn Martin
December 7	"Broken Wings"	Mr. Mister
December 14	"Broken Wings"	Mr. Mister
December 21	"Say You, Say Me"	Lionel Richie
December 28	"Say You, Say Me"	Lionel Richie

== See also ==
- 1985 in music
- List of Hot 100 number-one singles of 1985 (U.S.)
