= List of Billboard Hot 100 number ones of 1985 =

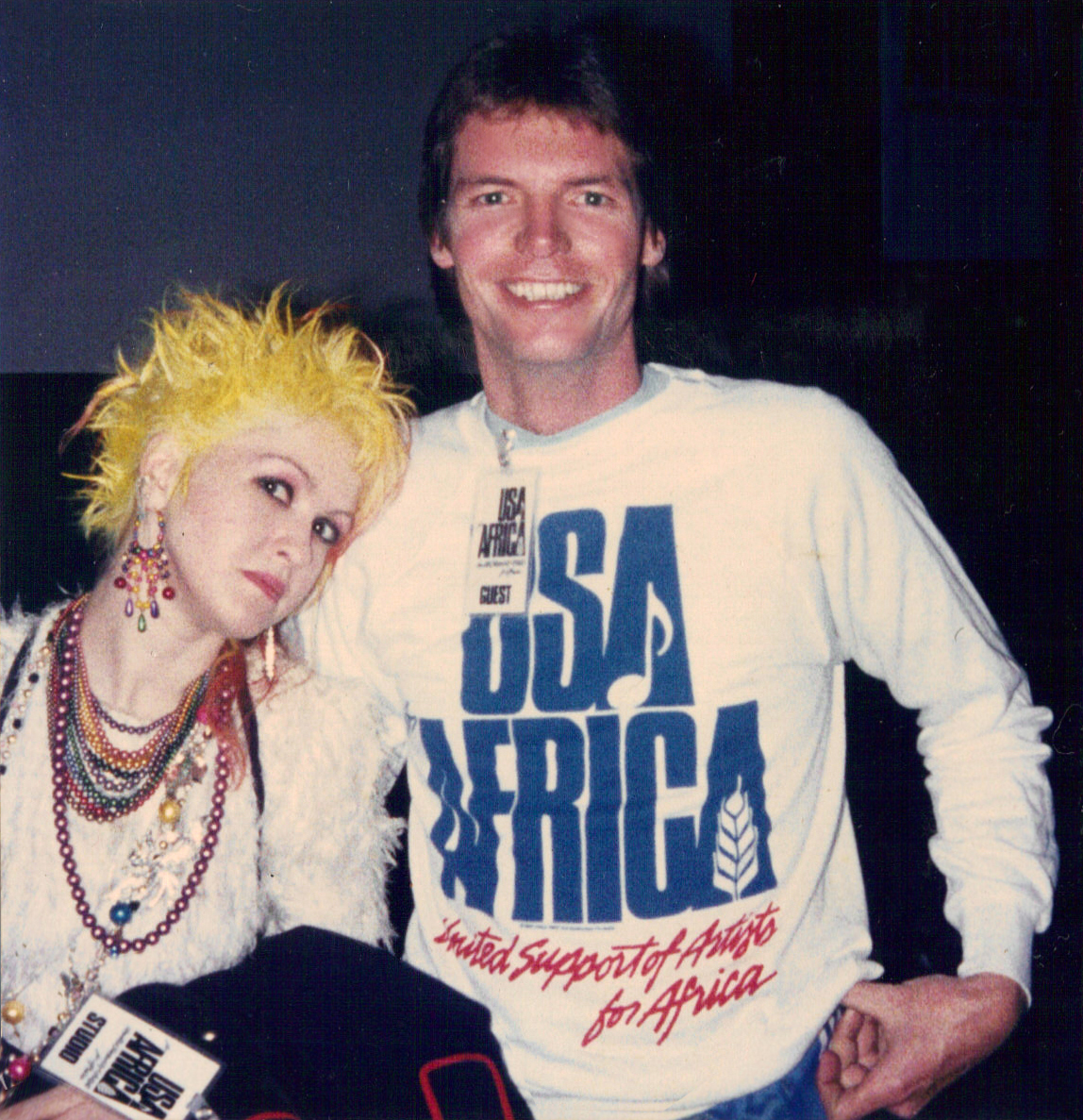
Cyndi Lauper, studio badge, and the sweatshirt given to all attendees at A&M Studios in Hollywood, California on January 28, 1985, during the recording of "We Are the World".

These are the Billboard Hot 100 number-one hits of 1985. The two longest running number-one singles of 1985 are "We Are the World" by USA for Africa and "Say You, Say Me" by Lionel Richie which each logged four weeks at number-one. "Say You, Say Me" logged two weeks at number-one in 1985 and two more additional weeks in 1986, reaching a total of four. "Like a Virgin" by Madonna concluded a six-week run that started in 1984.

That year, 17 acts first hit number one, such as Foreigner, USA for Africa, Simple Minds, Tears for Fears, Bryan Adams, Paul Young, Huey Lewis and the News, John Parr, Dire Straits, Ready for the World, a-ha, Whitney Houston, Jan Hammer, Starship, Marilyn Martin, and Mr. Mister. George Michael, having already hit number one with Wham!, also earns his first number one song as a solo act. Madonna, Wham!, Phil Collins, and Tears for Fears were the only acts to have more than one song reach number one, with Phil Collins having the most with three, while the others have two.

This was also a record year for British acts with 13 hits reaching the top spot. As of 2025 this record remains unbroken.

== Chart history ==
Key
The yellow background indicates the #1 song on Billboard's 1985 Year-End Chart of Pop Singles.

| No. | Issue date | Song | Artist(s) | Ref. |
|---|---|---|---|---|
| 561 | January 5 | "Like a Virgin" | Madonna | |
| 561 | January 12 | "Like a Virgin" | Madonna | |
| 561 | January 19 | "Like a Virgin" | Madonna | |
| 561 | January 26 | "Like a Virgin" | Madonna | |
| 562 | February 2 | "I Want to Know What Love Is" | Foreigner | |
| 562 | February 9 | "I Want to Know What Love Is" | Foreigner | |
| 563 | February 16 | "Careless Whisper" | Wham! featuring George Michael | |
| 563 | February 23 | "Careless Whisper" | Wham! featuring George Michael | |
| 563 | March 2 | "Careless Whisper" | Wham! featuring George Michael | |
| 564 | March 9 | "Can't Fight This Feeling" | REO Speedwagon | |
| 564 | March 16 | "Can't Fight This Feeling" | REO Speedwagon | |
| 564 | March 23 | "Can't Fight This Feeling" | REO Speedwagon | |
| 565 | March 30 | "One More Night" | Phil Collins | |
| 565 | April 6 | "One More Night" | Phil Collins | |
| 566 | April 13 | "We Are the World" | USA for Africa | |
| 566 | April 20 | "We Are the World" | USA for Africa | |
| 566 | April 27 | "We Are the World" | USA for Africa | |
| 566 | May 4 | "We Are the World" | USA for Africa | |
| 567 | May 11 | "Crazy for You" | Madonna | |
| 568 | May 18 | "Don't You (Forget About Me)" | Simple Minds | |
| 569 | May 25 | "Everything She Wants" | Wham! | |
| 569 | June 1 | "Everything She Wants" | Wham! | |
| 570 | June 8 | "Everybody Wants to Rule the World" | Tears for Fears | |
| 570 | June 15 | "Everybody Wants to Rule the World" | Tears for Fears | |
| 571 | June 22 | "Heaven" | Bryan Adams | |
| 571 | June 29 | "Heaven" | Bryan Adams | |
| 572 | July 6 | "Sussudio" | Phil Collins | |
| 573 | July 13 | "A View to a Kill" | Duran Duran | |
| 573 | July 20 | "A View to a Kill" | Duran Duran | |
| 574 | July 27 | "Everytime You Go Away" | Paul Young | |
| 575 | August 3 | "Shout" | Tears for Fears | |
| 575 | August 10 | "Shout" | Tears for Fears | |
| 575 | August 17 | "Shout" | Tears for Fears | |
| 576 | August 24 | "The Power of Love" | Huey Lewis and the News | |
| 576 | August 31 | "The Power of Love" | Huey Lewis and the News | |
| 577 | September 7 | "St. Elmo's Fire (Man in Motion)" | John Parr | |
| 577 | September 14 | "St. Elmo's Fire (Man in Motion)" | John Parr | |
| 578 | September 21 | "Money for Nothing" | Dire Straits | |
| 578 | September 28 | "Money for Nothing" | Dire Straits | |
| 578 | October 5 | "Money for Nothing" | Dire Straits | |
| 579 | October 12 | "Oh Sheila" | Ready for the World | |
| 580 | October 19 | "Take On Me" | a-ha | |
| 581 | October 26 | "Saving All My Love for You" | Whitney Houston | |
| 582 | November 2 | "Part-Time Lover" | Stevie Wonder | |
| 583 | November 9 | "Miami Vice Theme" | Jan Hammer | |
| 584 | November 16 | "We Built This City" | Starship | |
| 584 | November 23 | "We Built This City" | Starship | |
| 585 | November 30 | "Separate Lives" | Phil Collins and Marilyn Martin | |
| 586 | December 7 | "Broken Wings" | Mr. Mister | |
| 586 | December 14 | "Broken Wings" | Mr. Mister | |
| 587 | December 21 | "Say You, Say Me" | Lionel Richie | |
| 587 | December 28 | "Say You, Say Me" | Lionel Richie | |

== Number-one artists ==
List of number-one artists by total weeks at number one
| Position | Artist | Weeks at No. 1 |
|---|---|---|
| 1 | Madonna | 5 |
| 1 | Wham! | 5 |
| 1 | Tears for Fears | 5 |
| 4 | USA for Africa | 4 |
| 4 | Phil Collins | 4 |
| 6 | George Michael | 3 |
| 6 | REO Speedwagon | 3 |
| 6 | Dire Straits | 3 |
| 9 | Foreigner | 2 |
| 9 | Bryan Adams | 2 |
| 9 | Duran Duran | 2 |
| 9 | Huey Lewis and the News | 2 |
| 9 | John Parr | 2 |
| 9 | Starship | 2 |
| 9 | Mr. Mister | 2 |
| 9 | Lionel Richie | 2 |
| 17 | Simple Minds | 1 |
| 17 | Paul Young | 1 |
| 17 | Ready for the World | 1 |
| 17 | a-ha | 1 |
| 17 | Whitney Houston | 1 |
| 17 | Stevie Wonder | 1 |
| 17 | Jan Hammer | 1 |
| 17 | Marilyn Martin | 1 |

== See also ==
- 1985 in music
- List of Cash Box Top 100 number-one singles of 1985
- List of Billboard Hot 100 number-one singles of the 1980s

== Additional sources ==
- Fred Bronson's Billboard Book of Number 1 Hits, 5th Edition (ISBN 0-8230-7677-6)
- Joel Whitburn's Top Pop Singles 1955-2008, 12 Edition (ISBN 0-89820-180-2)
- Joel Whitburn Presents the Billboard Hot 100 Charts: The Eighties (ISBN 0-89820-079-2)
- Additional information obtained can be verified within Billboard's online archive services and print editions of the magazine.
