= The Race Against Time =

1988 adventure video game

- Cover art featuring Jesse Owens
- Developer: Codemasters
- Publisher: Codemasters
- Designer: Oliver Twins
- Platforms: Amstrad CPC; Commodore 64; ZX Spectrum
- Release: April 1988
- Genre: Adventure
- Mode: Single-player

The Race Against Time is a 1988 adventure video game designed by the Oliver Twins, and developed and published by Codemasters. The player controls Sudanese runner Omar Khalifa, who has to venture to six continents to light torch bowls and raise flags to begin the 1988 Sport Aid, a sport-themed charity organization. A tie-in to the Sport Aid charity, all proceeds were donated to the campaign. The game was released for the Amstrad CPC, Commodore 64, and ZX Spectrum platforms.

The Race Against Time received a polarized reception from video game critics. The game had been expected to raise £1 million, but instead became a commercial failure, and Codemasters later expressed regret for their association with Sport Aid. After its release, the game had to be recalled because of Codemasters' unauthorized usage of an image of Jesse Owens on the packaging; it was replaced with a picture of Carl Lewis.

== Gameplay ==
Opening screen

In The Race Against Time, the player controls Sudanese runner Omar Khalifa, who was the torch runner for the 1986 Sport Aid campaign. The goal of the game is to raise a flag and light a torch bowl in six continents over five in-game hours, beginning in Sudan. In side-scrolling game screens, the player runs past landmarks such as Buckingham Palace, the Sydney Opera House and Mount Rushmore. The player travels between screens by using airplanes or transporter arrows.

Each continent contains unique environmental hazards to avoid, such as falling bricks and collapsing bridges. Water and rain are also hazards as they can extinguish the torch and end the game. Letting the time run out also causes the game to end, requiring hourglasses to be collected to increase the time limit. Obstacles blocking the journey can be resolved by using gathered items, including a spanner and sandbag. Lighting all the flames and raising the flags opens up the final destination to the United Nations in New York City, beginning the 1988 Sport Aid.

== Development ==
The Race Against Time was designed by the Oliver Twins, Andrew and Philip Oliver, and was developed and published by Codemasters. Codemasters contacted the Sport Aid charity, volunteering the twins to be the designers. They wrote the game using the same game engine for their Dizzy series. Gameplay was first shown on the television programme Get Fresh, on 7 May 1988. Peter Gabriel's 1980 single "Games Without Frontiers" was included in the game's soundtrack. The game was released in April 1988 for the Amstrad CPC, Commodore 64, and ZX Spectrum computers.

The original packaging of The Race Against Time had an image of American athlete Jesse Owens on its front cover. However, after the game had been released, Owens’ estate objected. Codemasters had neglected to obtain permission from the family to use Owens' likeness, and they declined to grant permission retroactively. Therefore, Codemasters was forced to recall all of the copies of the game that had already been produced, and to change promotional materials. The company replaced the image of Owens with one of Carl Lewis, who had offered the use of his likeness for free. ACE magazine would later call the game's botched release one of the biggest marketing disasters of 1988.

== Reception ==
Reception

Review scores
Publication	Score
Your Sinclair	8/10 (Spectrum)
Computer and Video Games	8/10 (CPC); 7/10 (Spectrum)
Crash	79% (Spectrum)
Amstrad Action	68% (CPC)
Sinclair User	52% (Spectrum)
Commodore User	5/10 (C64)
Zzap64	30% (C64)

Upon its release, The Race Against Time received a polarized reception by video game critics reviewing the versions on all three platforms. Paul Boughton recommended the game in Computer and Video Games, calling it a "decent arcade adventure for a decent price". Rachael MacDonald from Your Sinclair was also positive, calling it a "more than competent arcade adventure", as well as noting that the proceeds would go to charity. Sinclair User reviewed the gameplay and animation negatively, criticizing the running animation as "unconvincing" and calling the background art "dreadful". Zzap!64 reviewed the Commodore 64 version, describing it as "abysmal" and criticizing the controls for being too awkward. Commodore User gave the Commodore version an overall rating of 5/10, calling the game "nothing special".

The game was a commercial flop. Sport Aid had predicted it would raise £1 million for the charity. However, it only sold 25,000 copies. In December 1988, Codemasters expressed regret for having been associated with Sport Aid. This announcement came after the disclosure that Sport Aid Limited was £2 million in debt.
