= Sowing the Seeds =

Video by Tears for Fears
- Released: 1990
- Recorded: 1989–1990
- Length: 21 minutes
- Label: Fontana; PolyGram Music Video
- Director: Jim Blashfield; Andy Morahan; Paul Donnellon
- Producer: Paul Diener; Luc Roeg; Commanding Images

Tears for Fears chronology
Scenes from the Big Chair (1985)	Sowing the Seeds (1990)	Going to California (1990)

Sowing the Seeds is a music compilation video released by the English band Tears for Fears.

Released in 1990, it features the three hit singles from their platinum selling third album The Seeds of Love and also an animated promo video for the song "Tears Roll Down" which was the B-side to their 1989 hit single "Sowing the Seeds of Love".

== Track listing ==
- "Sowing the Seeds of Love" (directed by Jim Blashfield)
- "Woman in Chains" (featuring Oleta Adams) (directed by Andy Morahan)
- "Tears Roll Down" (directed by Paul Donnellon)
- "Advice for the Young at Heart" (directed by Andy Morahan)
- (additional music: "Always in the Past")

Music produced by Tears for Fears and Dave Bascombe.
