= Money for Nothing =

1985 single by Dire Straits

Single by Dire Straits

from the album Brothers in Arms
- B-side: "Love over Gold" (Live)
- Released: 28 June 1985
- Studio: AIR (Salem, Montserrat)
- Genre: Pop rock
- Length: 8:22 (album version); 7:04 (LP edit); 4:38 (single version); 4:06 (radio edit)
- Label: Vertigo
- Songwriters: Mark Knopfler; Sting
- Producers: Neil Dorfsman; Mark Knopfler

Dire Straits singles chronology
"So Far Away" (1985)	"Money for Nothing" (1985)	"Brothers in Arms" (1985)

Music video
- "Money for Nothing" on YouTube

Audio
- "Money for Nothing" on YouTube

"Money for Nothing" is a song by the British rock band Dire Straits, the second track on their fifth studio album Brothers in Arms (1985). It was released as the album's second single on 28 June 1985 through Vertigo Records. The song's lyrics are written from the point of view of two working-class men watching music videos and commenting on what they see. The song features a guest appearance by Sting, who sings the signature falsetto introduction, background vocals and a backing chorus of "I want my MTV" set to the same notes as the verses of the Police's hit "Don't Stand So Close To Me". The groundbreaking Steve Barron-directed music video, one of the first uses of computer-animated human characters, was the first to be aired on MTV Europe when the network launched on 1 August 1987.

"Money for Nothing" peaked at number one for three weeks on both the US Billboard Hot 100 and Rock Top Tracks chart and at number four in the band's native UK. In July 1985, the month following its release, Dire Straits and Sting performed the song at Live Aid. At the 28th Annual Grammy Awards in 1986, "Money for Nothing" won Best Rock Performance by a Duo or Group with Vocal and was nominated for Record of the Year and Song of the Year as well. At the 1986 MTV Video Music Awards, the music video received 11 nominations, winning Video of the Year and Best Group Video. It is considered one of the band's signature songs.

Until 2026, the sound of Sting's "MTV" in the introduction just prior to the drum cadenza served as the audio for MTV Entertainment Studios production credit title card.

== Composition ==
Dire Straits – "Money for Nothing"
The song is known for its controversial lyrics (Knopfler clarified the character he plays in the song is an "ignoramus"), ground-breaking music video, and a cameo appearance by Sting singing the song's falsetto introduction and backing chorus, "I want my MTV".

=== Music ===
"Money for Nothing" is a pop rock song. As per keyboardist Alan Clark, the song started as a more Rolling Stones-like track in rehearsals, before Knopfler came up with the song's riff while improvising in the studio. They had also stumbled on the guitar sound by accident, so Knopfler recorded his guitar parts to a click track to get the song down, then the rest of the track was constructed via overdubbing. Knopfler modeled his guitar sound on ZZ Top guitarist Billy Gibbons's trademark guitar tone, as ZZ Top's music videos were already a staple of early MTV. Gibbons told Timothy White of Musician in late 1985 that Knopfler had solicited his help in replicating the tone, adding, "He didn't do a half-bad job, either, considering that I never told him a goddamned thing!"

Following the initial sessions in Montserrat where they recorded the main guitar part, Neil Dorfsman tried to recreate the sound in subsequent sessions at the Power Station in New York but was unsuccessful. At one stage, drummer Terry Williams' parts became an issue, so they ended up recruiting session musician Omar Hakim to re-do them; Williams' intro and tom-tom fills throughout the song were kept, while Hakim played the straight beat.

=== Lyrics ===
Mark Knopfler described the writing of the song in a 1985 interview with author Bill Flanagan:

The lead character in "Money for Nothing" is a guy who works in the hardware department in a television/custom kitchen/refrigerator/microwave appliance store. He's singing the song. I wrote the song when I was actually in the store. I borrowed a bit of paper and started to write the song down in the store. I wanted to use a lot of the language that the real guy actually used when I heard him, because it was more real....

In 2000, Knopfler appeared on Parkinson on BBC One and further explained where the lyrics originated. According to Knopfler, he had visited an appliance store in New York City. At the back of the store, a wall of televisions were all tuned to MTV. Knopfler said that standing next to him, watching the TVs, there was a male employee, dressed in a baseball cap, work boots, and a checkered shirt, who was delivering boxes. As they watched MTV, the man said things like, "What are those, Hawaiian noises?... That ain't workin'," etc. Knopfler requested a pen to write some of these lines down, and eventually put them to music. The first-person narrator in the lyrics describes a musician "banging on the bongos like a chimpanzee" and a woman "stickin' in the camera - Man, we could have some fun". In the second verse, the performer is described as "that little faggot with the earring and the make-up", and the narrator bemoans that these artists get "Money for nothing and chicks for free."

The songwriting credits are shared between Mark Knopfler and Sting. According to Knopfler, he used the network slogan "I want my MTV" after seeing an MTV advertisement featuring The Police and setting it to the tune of "Don't Stand So Close to Me" (written by Sting), hence the cowriting credit. "Sting used to come to Montserrat to go windsurfing," recalled John Illsley, "and he came up for supper at the studio. We played him 'Money for Nothing' and he turned round and said, 'You've done it this time, you bastards.' Mark said if he thought it was so good, why didn't he go and add something to it. He did his bit there and then."

Sting elaborated on his co-writing credit in a 1987 interview:

Mark [Knopfler] asked me to go in the studio and sing this line, "I want my MTV." He gave me the melody, and I thought, "Oh, great, 'Don't Stand So Close to Me', that's a nice quote, it's fun." So I did it, and thought nothing of it, until my publishers, Virgin - who I've been at war with for years and who I have no respect for - decided that was a song they owned, 'Don't Stand So Close to Me'. They said that they wanted a percentage of the song, much to my embarrassment. So they took it.

However, keyboardist Alan Clark claims the "I want my MTV" intro was his idea and not Knopfler's. According to him, the song originally began with the guitar riff, and then he developed the intro on keyboards and sang "I want my MTV" on top during a break in rehearsals for the album.

== Music video ==
The song's music video features early computer animation.

The music video for the song features early 3D computer animation illustrating the lyrics. The video was one of the first uses of computer-animated human characters and was groundbreaking at the time of its release.

The video makes references to the following (nonexistent) songs, bands, albums, and labels:

- "Baby, Baby" by First Floor, from Turn Left; Magyar Records
- "Sally" by the Ian Pearson Band, from Hot Dogs; Rush Records

Originally, Mark Knopfler was not at all enthusiastic about the concept of the music video. MTV, however, was insistent on it. Director Steve Barron, of Rushes Postproduction in London, was contacted by Warner Bros. to persuade Knopfler to relent. Describing the contrasting attitudes of Knopfler and MTV, he said:

The problem was that Mark Knopfler was very anti-videos. All he wanted to do was perform, and he thought that videos would destroy the purity of songwriters and performers. They said, "Can you convince him that this is the right thing to do, because we've played this song to MTV and they think it's fantastic but they won't play it if it's him standing there playing guitar. They need a concept."

Barron then flew to Budapest to convince Knopfler of their concept. Meeting together after a gig, Knopfler was still unimpressed, but this time his girlfriend was present and took a hand. According to Barron:

Luckily, his girlfriend said, "He's absolutely right. There aren't enough interesting videos on MTV, and that sounds like a brilliant idea." Mark didn't say anything but he didn't make the call to get me out of Budapest. We just went ahead and did it.

Ian Pearson and Gavin Blair created the animation, using a Bosch FGS-4000 CGI system and a Quantel Paintbox system. The animators went on to found computer animation studio Mainframe Entertainment (today Mainframe Studios), and referenced the "Money for Nothing" video in an episode of their ReBoot series called "Talent Night." The video also includes stage footage of Dire Straits performing, with partially rotoscoped animation in bright neon colours, as seen on the cover of the compilation album of the same name.

== Notable performances ==
When Dire Straits performed "Money for Nothing" at the 1985 Live Aid Concert at Wembley Stadium, the performance featured a guest appearance by Sting. Knopfler performed "Money for Nothing" during the Nelson Mandela 70th Birthday Tribute and the Prince's Trust concerts in 1986 with Sting, as well as the Nordoff-Robbins charity show at Knebworth in 1990. These versions featured extended guitar solos by Knopfler, backed by Eric Clapton (as guest) and Phil Palmer.

== Critical reception ==
Cash Box said that it's "a simply rocking cut taking a look at jobs and videos performed by rock stars." Billboard called it a "bluesy poke at [Dire Straits' and Sting's] own kind; intentions ambiguous." Rolling Stone listed the song as the 94th greatest guitar song of all time, noting how Mark Knopfler "traded his pristine, rootsy tone for a dry, over-processed sound achieved by running a Les Paul through a wah-wah pedal on a track that became one of the [MTV] network's earliest hits." AllMusic called the song one of Knopfler's finest lyrical moments and the hook one of the best and catchiest of the time period. In 2018, Classic Rock wrote: "At its core, 'Money For Nothing' was an old-school boogie, but a dash of studio polish, Sting's mannered backing vocal and a computer-generated promo video were enough to turn it, and Dire Straits themselves, into the very embodiment of 80s naff."

=== Accolades ===
Nominations for "Money for Nothing"
Year	Ceremony	Nominated work	Nominee	Category	Result
1986	Brit Awards	"Money for Nothing"	Dire Straits	British Single of the Year	Nominated
1986	Brit Awards	"Money for Nothing"	Dire Straits	British Video of the Year	Nominated
1986	Grammy Awards	"Money for Nothing"	Dire Straits	Best Rock Performance by a Duo or Group with Vocal	Won
1986	Grammy Awards	"Money for Nothing"	Dire Straits; Neil Dorfsman and Mark Knopfler, producers	Record of the Year	Nominated
1986	Grammy Awards	"Money for Nothing"	Dire Straits; Mark Knopfler and Sting, songwriters	Song of the Year	Nominated
1986	MTV Video Music Awards	"Money for Nothing"	Steve Barron, art direction	Best Art Direction in a Video	Nominated
1986	MTV Video Music Awards	"Money for Nothing"	Dire Straits	Best Concept Video	Nominated
1986	MTV Video Music Awards	"Money for Nothing"	Steve Barron, director	Best Direction in a Video	Nominated
1986	MTV Video Music Awards	"Money for Nothing"	David Yardley, editor	Best Editing in a Video	Nominated
1986	MTV Video Music Awards	"Money for Nothing"	Dire Straits	Best Experimental Video	Nominated
1986	MTV Video Music Awards	"Money for Nothing"	Dire Straits	Best Group Video	Won
1986	MTV Video Music Awards	"Money for Nothing"	Dire Straits	Best Overall Performance in a Video	Nominated
1986	MTV Video Music Awards	"Money for Nothing"	Dire Straits	Best Stage Performance in a Video	Nominated
1986	MTV Video Music Awards	"Money for Nothing"	Ian Pearson, special effects	Best Visual Effects in a Video	Nominated
1986	MTV Video Music Awards	"Money for Nothing"	Dire Straits	Video of the Year	Won
1986	MTV Video Music Awards	"Money for Nothing"	Dire Straits	Viewer's Choice	Nominated

== Lyrics controversy ==
Some lyrics of the song have been criticised as being homophobic. In a late 1985 interview in Rolling Stone magazine, Knopfler expressed mixed feelings on the controversy:

I got an objection from the editor of a gay newspaper in London – he actually said it was below the belt. Apart from the fact that there are stupid gay people as well as stupid other people, it suggests that maybe you can't let it have so many meanings – you have to be direct. In fact, I'm still in two minds as to whether it's a good idea to write songs that aren't in the first person, to take on other characters. The singer in "Money for Nothing" is a real ignoramus, hard hat mentality – somebody who sees everything in financial terms. I mean, this guy has a grudging respect for rock stars. He sees it in terms of, well, that's not working and yet the guy's rich: that's a good scam. He isn't sneering.

When examined in context, Knopfler is mocking the jealous and homophobic nature of the antagonist in the song by adopting a third-person point of view to show the irony, bigotry, and ignorance of the character. For the band's 10 July 1985 concert (televised in the United Kingdom on The Tube on Channel 4 in January 1986), Knopfler replaced the word faggot with queenie:

"See the little queenie got the earring and the make-up" and "That little queenie got his own jet airplane, he's got a helicopter, he's a millionaire."

When the song was included in the 1998 compilation Sultans of Swing: The Very Best of Dire Straits, a radio edit that completely omitted the second verse was included. In January 2011, the Canadian Broadcast Standards Council (CBSC) ruled that the unedited version of the song was unacceptable for airplay on private Canadian radio stations, as it breached the Canadian Association of Broadcasters' code of ethics and their equitable portrayal code. The CBSC concluded that "like other racially driven words in the English language, 'faggot' is one that, even if entirely or marginally acceptable in earlier days, is no longer so." The CBSC's proceedings came in response to a radio listener's Ruling Request stemming from a playing of the song by CHOZ-FM in St. John's, Newfoundland and Labrador, which in turn followed the radio listener's dissatisfaction with the radio station's reply to their complaint about the word 'faggot' in the lyrics.

Not all stations followed this ruling; at least two—CIRK-FM in Edmonton, Alberta, and CFRQ-FM in Halifax, Nova Scotia—played the unedited version of "Money for Nothing" repeatedly for one hour out of protest. Galaxie, which was owned by the Canadian Broadcasting Corporation (the CBC) at the time of the controversy, also continued to play the song. On 21 January 2011, the Canadian Radio-television and Telecommunications Commission asked the CBSC for a review on the ban, in response to the public outcry against the CBSC's actions; the commission reportedly received over 250 complaints erroneously sent to them, instead of the CBSC. The regulator requested the CBSC to appoint a nationwide panel to review the case, as the decision on the ban was reviewed by a regional panel for the Maritimes and Newfoundland.

On 31 August 2011, the CBSC reiterated that it found the use of 'faggot' to be inappropriate; however, because of considerations in regard to its use in context, the CBSC has left it up to the stations to decide whether to play the original or edited versions of the song. Most of the CBSC panellists thought it was inappropriate, but it was used only in a satirical, non-hateful manner.

== Personnel ==
Personnel are sourced from Sound on Sound.

Dire Straits

- Mark Knopfler – lead vocals, electric guitar
- Guy Fletcher – Yamaha DX1 synthesiser, Synclavier, Roland keyboards
- Alan Clark – Hammond organ
- John Illsley – bass
- Terry Williams – drum intro

Additional musicians

- Sting – intro vocals, harmonies and backing vocals
- Omar Hakim – drums

== Charts ==
=== Weekly charts ===
Chart (1985)	Peak position
Australia (Kent Music Report)	4
Austria (Ö3 Austria Top 40)	7
Belgium (Ultratop 50 Flanders)	38
Canada Retail Singles (The Record)	1
Canada Top Singles (RPM)	1
Europe (European Hot 100 Singles)	26
Finland (Suomen virallinen lista)	4
France (SNEP)	34
Ireland (IRMA)	6
Netherlands (Single Top 100)	35
New Zealand (Recorded Music NZ)	4
South Africa (Springbok Radio)	25
Spain (AFYVE)	25
Switzerland (Schweizer Hitparade)	22
UK Singles (Official Charts)	4
US Billboard Hot 100	1
US Billboard Top Rock Tracks	1
US Cash Box	1
West Germany (GfK)	19

Chart (2026)	Peak position
Sweden Heatseeker (Sverigetopplistan)	20

=== Year-end charts ===
Chart (1985)	Position
Australia (Kent Music Report)	7
Canada Top Singles (RPM)	34
New Zealand (RIANZ)	5
UK Singles (OCC)	38
US Billboard Hot 100	8
US Cash Box	2

Chart (1988)	Position
Tokyo (Tokio Hot 100)	86

== Certifications ==
Region	Certification	Certified units/sales
Canada (Music Canada)	Gold	50,000^{^}
Denmark (IFPI Danmark)	2× Platinum	180,000^{‡}
Germany (BVMI)	Gold	250,000^{‡}
Italy (FIMI)	Platinum	70,000^{‡}
New Zealand (RMNZ)	6× Platinum	180,000^{‡}
Spain (Promusicae)	Platinum	60,000^{‡}
United Kingdom (BPI)	Platinum	600,000^{‡}
^{^} Shipments figures based on certification alone.^{‡} Sales+streaming figures based on certification alone.

== Auction ==
In 2024 the 1983 Gibson Les Paul Standard reissue guitar Knopfler played on the song sold for £592,200 in a Christie's auction in London that included a total of 122 lots.

== See also ==
- "Weird Al" Yankovic's parody "Money for Nothing/Beverly Hillbillies*"
- List of Billboard Hot 100 number ones of 1985
- List of Billboard Mainstream Rock number-one songs of the 1980s
- List of Cash Box Top 100 number-one singles of 1985
- List of number-one singles of 1985 (Canada)
