= Ian Stanley =

British musician

- Born: Ian Christopher Stanley; 28 February 1957 (age 69)
- Origin: High Wycombe, Buckinghamshire, England
- Genres: Rock; hard rock; new wave
- Occupations: Musician; songwriter; record producer
- Instrument: Keyboards
- Years active: 1981–present
- Label: East West
- Formerly of: Tears for Fears; Mancrab; Headshells

Ian Christopher Stanley (born 28 February 1957) is a British musician, songwriter and record producer. He was a member of the English pop rock band Tears for Fears for most of the 1980s, and played a significant role in the making of their multi-platinum-selling second studio album Songs from the Big Chair (1985).

== Career ==
=== Work with Tears for Fears (1982–1989) ===
After offering them free use of his recording facility, Stanley became a member of Tears for Fears, contributing on synthesizers, drum machines, organ, pianos and backing vocals on their first three studio albums. He also co-wrote (with Roland Orzabal) many of their songs from the period 1983–1985, and was a part of the production team during this era as the band worked with producer Chris Hughes at their studio, the Wool Hall, in Bath, Somerset.

He has appeared in several Tears for Fears music videos, including "Change" (in which he plays one of the two masked musicians), "Mothers Talk" (versions 1 and 3), "Shout", "Everybody Wants to Rule the World", "Head over Heels" and "I Believe", and has performed with the band on many television performances. He also appeared in the Tears for Fears concert performance video In My Mind's Eye (1983), and the Tears for Fears documentary film Scenes from the Big Chair (1985), as well as completing two world tours with the band.

=== Post-Tears for Fears and production ===
Following the success of Songs from the Big Chair, Stanley collaborated with Roland Orzabal on the 1986 side project Mancrab, releasing a single, "Fish for Life", which was made for the soundtrack of the American martial arts drama film The Karate Kid Part II. Stanley also began working on Tears for Fears' third studio album, The Seeds of Love (1989), but (along with producer Chris Hughes) left the project due to creative differences. His more prominent contributions to this album, however, can be heard on the hit single "Sowing the Seeds of Love" and the B-sides "Always in the Past" and "My Life in the Suicide Ranks".

He admitted that his choice to leave the band was a hard one, but cited several reasons for his departure, the main one being he believed Orzabal was "accelerating away" from the rest of the band in terms of his vocal power and the proficiency of the instruments he played. Also around this time Stanley wanted to become a record producer and/or make film music. He has expressed his dislike for their third studio album The Seeds of Love, stating that "Badman's Song" is "too long and overdrawn", that "Advice for the Young at Heart" is "lightweight", and that some lines in "Woman in Chains" are "cheap and throwaway", the main example being "so free her" at the end of the song. He believed that Tears for Fears were a synth-pop duo, and imagined that their third studio album would be like Songs from the Big Chair, "but with a bit more rock".

Since the 1980s, Stanley has produced such artists as Lloyd Cole and the Commotions, a-ha, the Pretenders, Howard Jones, Ultra, Republica, Naimee Coleman, Natalie Imbruglia, Propaganda, the Human League and Tori Amos. He also contributed to the Sisters of Mercy re-recording of "Temple of Love" and additional production on "Under the Gun". Stanley also did A&R for East West Records, but left in 1998.

In 2006, Stanley produced the Beautiful South's tenth and final studio album Superbi (2007), in part at his Irish studio in Enniskerry, County Wicklow.

In 2009, Stanley joined forces with members of the Tears for Fears touring band from 1985 to form Headshells, with original Tears for Fears drummer Manny Elias, saxophonist Will Gregory and bassist Lee Gorman. The band, billed as "Ian Stanley, Manny Elias, Lee Gorman & Will Gregory", played one live show at the Grand in Clitheroe, Lancashire to a capacity crowd, but shortly after the event – which was well received by fans of classic Tears for Fears songs – it was announced on Elias' official website that they would be too busy to commit to Headshells on an ongoing basis, and so Headshells came to an end.

In February 2020, Stanley appeared on the BBC's Classic Albums documentary series in the episode dedicated to Songs from the Big Chair which aired around the 35th anniversary of the album.
