= I Believe (Tears for Fears song) =

"I Believe (A Soulful Re-Recording)"

Single by Tears for Fears

from the album Songs from the Big Chair
- B-side: "Sea Song"
- Released: 4 October 1985
- Recorded: 1985
- Genre: Jazz
- Length: 4:35
- Label: Phonogram; Mercury
- Songwriter: Roland Orzabal
- Producer: Tears for Fears

Tears for Fears singles chronology
"Pale Shelter (You Don't Give Me Love) [third release]" (1985)	"I Believe (A Soulful Re-Recording)" (1985)	"Everybody Wants to Run the World" (1986)

Music video
- "I Believe (A Soulful Re-Recording)" on YouTube

"I Believe (A Soulful Re-Recording)" is a song by the English new wave band Tears for Fears. It was the band's eleventh single release, and as a live re-recording of a song from their second LP Songs from the Big Chair, it effectively served as that album's fifth single. It was Tears for Fears' ninth UK top 40 hit (peaking at No. 23). The song also reached the top 10 in Ireland and peaked at No. 28 in New Zealand.

The song was written by Roland Orzabal, who dedicated the song to Robert Wyatt in the liner notes of Songs from the Big Chair. This message was accompanied by the addendum "(If he's listening)", which references the song "Dedicated to You but You Weren't Listening" from Wyatt's old band Soft Machine. The B-side to "I Believe (A Soulful Re-Recording)" was a cover of Wyatt's "Sea Song", which first appeared on his Rock Bottom album.

For the re-recording, Orzabal shouts "William!" prior to a saxophone solo. The shout was directed at Tears for Fears' touring saxophonist of the time, Will Gregory, who also appeared in the song's music video.

== Track listings ==
=== 7": Mercury / IDEA11 (UK) ===
1. "I Believe (A Soulful Re-Recording)" (4:35)
2. "Sea Song" (3:52)

=== 2x7": Mercury / IDEA1111 (UK) ===
1. "I Believe (A Soulful Re-Recording)" (4:35)
2. "Sea Song" (3:52)
1. "I Believe" (album version) (4:37)
2. "Shout" (dub version) (6:45)

=== 10": Mercury / IDEA1110 (UK) ===
1. "I Believe (A Soulful Re-Recording)" (4:35)
2. "I Believe" (album version) (4:37)
3. "Sea Song" (3:52)

=== 12": Mercury / IDEA1112 (UK) ===
1. "I Believe (A Soulful Re-Recording)" (4:35)
2. "Shout" (dub version) (6:45)
3. "Sea Song" (3:52)
4. "Shout" (U.S. remix) (8:00)

== Credits and personnel ==
Tears for Fears

- Roland Orzabal – lead vocals, grand piano (Note: On the studio version)
- Curt Smith – backing vocals, triangle, bass guitar
- Ian Stanley – keyboards
- Manny Elias – drums

Additional personnel

- Will Gregory – saxophone (both studio & live recordings)
- Andy Sanders – acoustic guitar (live)
- Nicky Holland – piano (live)

"Sea Song"

- Roland Orzabal – lead vocals
- Nicky Holland – piano
- Ian Stanley – keyboards
- David Bascombe – keyboards
