= Sport Aid =

Sport-themed campaign held in 1986 and 1988

Sport Aid (also known as Sports Aid) was a sport-themed campaign for African famine relief held in May 1986, involving several days of all-star exhibition events in various sports, and culminating in the Race Against Time, a 10 km fun run held simultaneously in 89 countries. Timed to coincide with a UNICEF development conference in New York City, Sport Aid raised $37 million for Live Aid and UNICEF. A second, lower-key Sport Aid was held in 1988.

== Organisation ==
The event was organised by chairman and founder Chris Long, Bob Geldof (Band Aid and Live Aid) and John Anderson (Head of Global Special Events, UNICEF).

A central event was the lighting of a symbolic torch at the United Nations by Omar Khalifa, a champion Sudanese 1500m runner, to signal the start of the 10K races around the world. Khalifa began his journey to the UN on May 16, when he lit a torch from the embers of a fire in El Moweilih relief camp in the Sudan. He was then flown to Athens, where the torch of Africa and the Olympic torch were symbolically joined. This marked the first time the Olympic torch had been lit outside of an Olympic Games. Khalifa then ran through 12 European capitals, and was greeted by leaders such as Margaret Thatcher, Prince Charles and Princess Diana, François Mitterrand, Helmut Kohl and Pope John Paul II.

The events in the United States were not widely publicized, due in part to the Hands Across America fundraiser, to fight hunger and homelessness, occurring around the same time. Sport Aid was scheduled to take place on the eve of a UN special session on Africa; therefore, the conflict could not be avoided.

== 1986 ==
=== Race Against Time ===
At 15:00 UTC on Sunday, May 25, 1986, runners around the world ran, jogged or walked 10 kilometers, having collected sponsorships or donations to support African famine relief charities.

274 cities held official events, allowing over 19.8 million participants to follow designated courses, with television coverage worldwide. London saw 200,000 runners complete the course, Barcelona hosted 50,000, Athens 30,000, Santiago 15,000, Dublin 20,000, Port of Spain 15,000, and Melbourne 10,000. These runners and millions of others set out at the same time to run around their villages or local parks, or simply to take part in this global event. In the United States, New York City, Chicago, Atlanta and San Francisco participated, along with several running clubs in smaller towns, with New York hosting the flagship race.

The New York Times reported, "With 200,000 Londoners setting the pace, more than 20 million runners in 76 countries ran today in Sport Aid, a global benefit to raise money for the starving of Africa. Sport Aid is considered the biggest mass sport event ever organized.

=== Other events ===
Other events included the Ultimate Cricket Match between the West Indies and the Rest of the World, and a figure skating exhibition featuring Torvill and Dean.

A charity record was released to publicize and raise money for the event. Tears for Fears re-recorded their hit "Everybody Wants to Rule the World" as "Everybody Wants to Run the World".

== 1988 ==
=== Running All Over the World ===
In support of the 1988 Sport Aid event, the band Status Quo released the charity single "Running All Over the World", an adaptation of the band's well-known cover of "Rockin' All Over the World".

Concerts, known under the title First World Carnival, were held in London, Los Angeles, Rio de Janeiro, Harare, Kuala Lumpur and Brisbane. The charity run and the concert were broadcast in a two-hour programme and was expected to be viewed by 750 million viewers in 124 countries.

=== Race Against Time ===
==== Race ====
On Sunday, September 11 1988, runners around the world in 300 cities ran, jogged, or walked 5 kilometers, having collected sponsorships or donations to CARE to support African famine relief charities. The race began at 2:30 pm UTC. Celebrities like Madonna, Sting, Eurythmics, and Steve Winwood took part in the race as well.

==== Video game / aftermath ====
Also released was the video game tie-in The Race Against Time. The game is considered to have been a commercial failure; Sport Aid had predicted it would raise £1 million for the charity; it instead sold 25,000 copies. Following the game's failure, it was revealed in December 1988 that Sport Aid Limited had £2 million in debt.

== See also ==
- Sport Relief
- Children in Need
- Band Aid
- USA for Africa
