= Standing on the Corner of the Third World =

Song by Tears for Fears

from the album The Seeds of Love
- Released: 25 September 1989
- Genre: Jazz; art-pop; new wave; soft rock
- Length: 5:33
- Label: Fontana
- Songwriter: Roland Orzabal

"Standing on the Corner of the Third World" is a song by the English pop rock band Tears for Fears from their third album The Seeds of Love. Similar to "Woman in Chains", the lyrics relate to various political issues, including feminism and poverty.

The deluxe edition of the album includes a live jam version of the song that was released as the lead single to the deluxe edition of The Seeds of Love.

== Background ==
The song was a result of Roland Orzabal's therapy sessions. In an interview with Classic Pop, Orzabal said that he had visited an office established by the Association of Primal Psychotherapists, which was a 25 minute walk from his house. Orzabal attended these sessions three times a week where he shared information about his family life, including stories about the domestic abuse his mother endured at the hands of her husband. The emotions associated with these stories served as the impetus for the creation of "Standing on the Corner of the Third World", which Orzabal said "wasn't difficult to write".

Curt Smith and Orzabal contacted Oleta Adams two years before recording the song in 1987. Orzabal recalled the sessions that led up to the nine minute version: "We got Oleta in and we had Manu Katche on drums and Pino Palladino on bass and started playing live. It was incredible; those live sessions were magical. This was my primal therapy period, where I'd go off and have therapy and come back in a particularly open and emotional state. This song came out of that."

== Personnel ==
- Roland Orzabal – lead vocals, guitars, keyboards
- Curt Smith – backing vocals
- Tessa Niles – backing vocals
- Carol Kenyon – backing vocals
- Oleta Adams – acoustic piano, backing vocals
- Stewart Clark – synthesisers, Hammond organ
- Pino Palladino – bass guitar
- Manu Katché – drums
- Carole Steele – percussion
- Jon Hassell – trumpet
- Peter Hope-Evans – harmonica
