= Shout (Tears for Fears song) =

1984 single by Tears for Fears

Single by Tears for Fears

from the album Songs from the Big Chair
- B-side: "The Big Chair"
- Released: 23 November 1984
- Studio: The Wool Hall (Beckington, England)
- Genre: New wave; synth-pop; pop
- Length: 6:31 (album version); 6:00 (video version); 4:52 (single version); 3:59 (U.S. single version)
- Label: Phonogram; Mercury
- Songwriters: Roland Orzabal; Ian Stanley
- Producer: Chris Hughes

Tears for Fears singles chronology
"Mothers Talk" (1984)	"Shout" (1984)	"Everybody Wants to Rule the World" (1985)

Audio sample
- "Shout": file; help

Music video
- "Shout" on YouTube

"Shout" is a song by the English pop rock band Tears for Fears, released as the second single from their second studio album, Songs from the Big Chair (1985), on 23 November 1984. Roland Orzabal is the lead singer on the track, and he described it as "a simple song about protest". The single became the group's fourth top 5 hit on the UK Singles Chart, peaking at No. 4 in January 1985. In the US, it reached No. 1 on the Billboard Hot 100 on 3 August 1985 and remained there for three weeks; also topping the Cash Box chart. "Shout" became one of the most successful songs of 1985, eventually reaching No. 1 in multiple countries.

Featuring a repetitive hook and a synth-drone throughout, "Shout" is regarded as one of the most recognizable songs from the mid-eighties, with Chris True of AllMusic viewing it as Tears for Fears' defining moment. The song has been covered, remixed and sampled by many artists since its release. In 2010, it was used as the basis for the UK chart-topping song "Shout" (performed by an ensemble featuring Dizzee Rascal and James Corden), an unofficial anthem of the England football team in the 2010 FIFA World Cup.

== Background ==
While Tears for Fears' previous single "Mothers Talk" had showcased a new, more extroverted songwriting style, "Shout" was completed with power chords, heavy percussion, a synth bass solo and a vocal-sounding synth riff. It begins with a percussive loop from an E-mu Drumulator drum machine before leading into the song's chorus, which follows a I–♭VI–IV–I chord progression. The song also has a lengthy guitar solo, unusual for Tears for Fears. Orzabal has said that the song "is actually more concerned with political protest" than the common view that it is about primal scream theory.

The song was written in my front room on just a small synthesizer and a drum machine. Initially I only had the chorus, which was very repetitive, like a mantra. I played it to Ian Stanley, our keyboardist, and Chris Hughes, the producer. I saw it as a good album track, but they were convinced it would be a hit around the world.

— Roland Orzabal

Upon hearing "Shout", Stanley insisted that it would be a "worldwide smash" and assisted Orzabal in completing the song. As such, Stanley received co-writing credits for his contributions.

== Music video ==
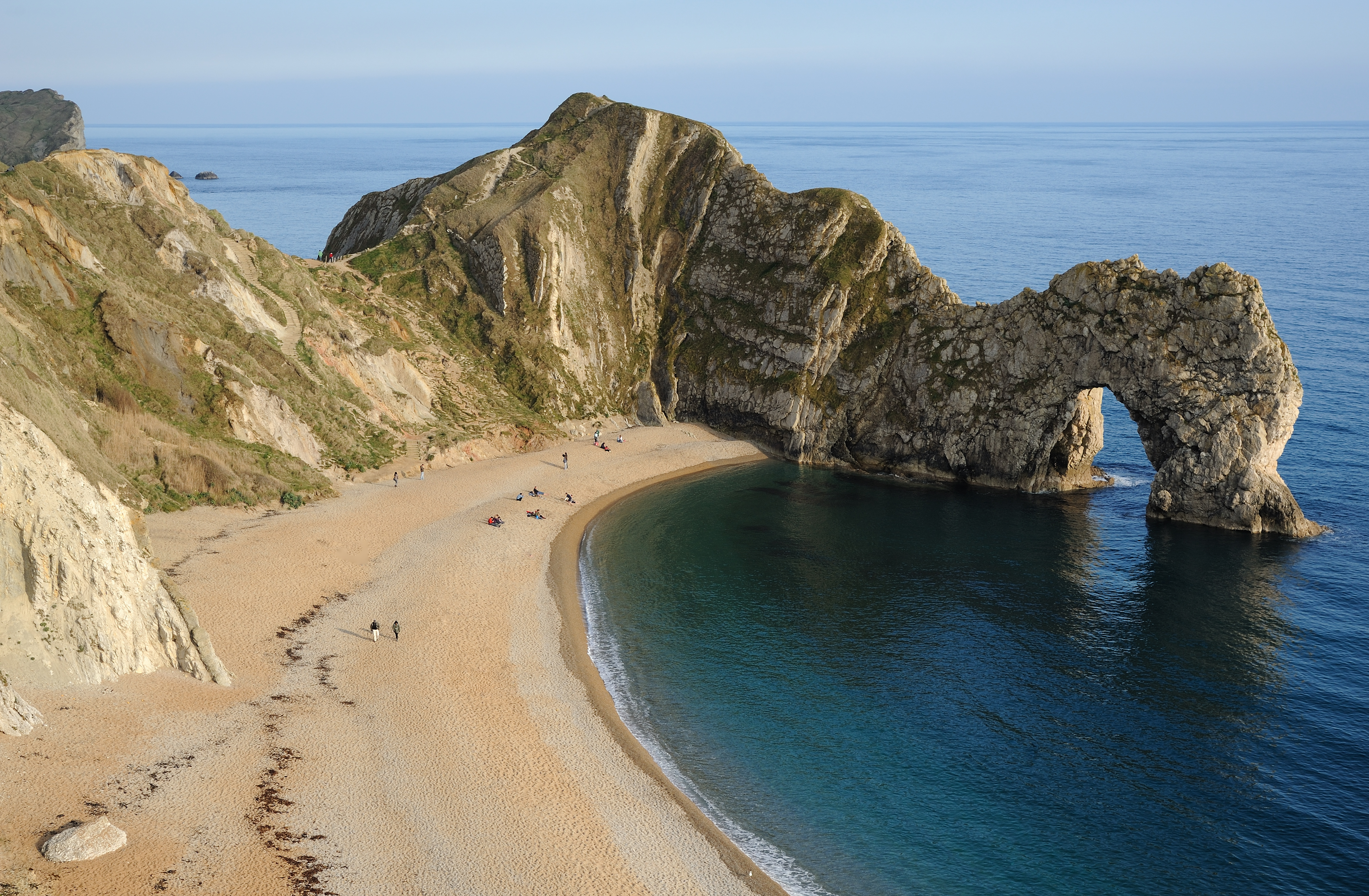
Durdle Door, Dorset, on the English coast, where some scenes in the music video were shot

The promotional video for "Shout", filmed in late 1984, was the second Tears for Fears video directed by Nigel Dick. It features footage of Roland Orzabal and Curt Smith at Durdle Door in Dorset on the south coast of England, as well as in a studio with the full band, including Ian Stanley and Manny Elias, performing the song amidst a crowd of family and friends.

Along with the clip for "Everybody Wants to Rule the World", the "Shout" video helped to establish Tears for Fears in North America due to its heavy airplay on the music video channel MTV.

== Release variations ==
In addition to the standard 7- and 12-inch releases, the "Shout" single was issued in two collectible formats in the UK: a limited-edition 10-inch single and a 7-inch boxed pack featuring a 1985 Tears for Fears calendar. A similar limited-edition 7-inch pack was released in Canada, this one featuring a 12-page booklet of band photos. In 1988, "Shout" was reissued on the short-lived CD Video format. The disc included two mixes of the title track, a remix of "Everybody Wants to Rule the World", and the "Shout" music video.

=== B-side ===
"The Big Chair" is the B-side to the "Shout" single. Though there are no lyrics, the track contains dialogue samples performed by actors Sally Field and William Prince from the 1976 television film Sybil, from which the song (and the album Songs from the Big Chair) takes its name. This is one of the few songs in the Tears for Fears catalogue on which bandmember Curt Smith shares a writing credit. The song has since been included in the band's B-sides and rarities collection Saturnine Martial & Lunatic (1996) as well as the remastered and deluxe edition reissues of Songs from the Big Chair.

This track was very much inspired by the film Sybil about a woman suffering from multiple personalities undergoing psychotherapy. The big chair in her therapist's office is the place Sybil feels safest to recount the horrors of her childhood.

— Roland Orzabal

== Reception ==
Cash Box said that it has "an anthemic chorus and a booming production sound". John Leland at Spin called it, "the simple, mindless pop song Depeche Mode has been trying to write for years. The vocals sound like they're coming from a porcelain bathroom at the foot of the Alps. Other than that, its got a singsong melody that numbs all critical faculties, portentious lyrics that signify nothing, and a happy lack of synth doodles or Bowie-isms." Smash Hits reviewer Lesley White described it as "Effective and powerful pop with an insidious chorus you'll find yourself singing at the most inopportune moments. For that reason, a hit."

== Track listings ==
7-inch: Mercury / IDEA8 (United Kingdom, Ireland, South Africa) / 880 294-7 (Australia, Europe) / SOV 2351 (Canada)
10-inch: Mercury / IDEA810 (United Kingdom)

1. "Shout" – 5:53
2. "The Big Chair" – 3:20

7-inch: Mercury / 880 481-7Q (Germany) / 7PP-167 (Japan)

1. "Shout [Short Version]" – 4:51
2. "The Big Chair" – 3:20

7-inch: Mercury / 880 294-7 (United States)

1. "Shout [US Single Version]" – 3:59
2. "The Big Chair" – 3:20

12-inch: Mercury / IDEA812 (United Kingdom) / 880 294-1 (Australia, Europe) / SOVX 2351 (Canada) / MIX 3080 (Mexico)

1. "Shout [Extended Version]" – 7:35
2. "Shout" – 5:53
3. "The Big Chair" – 3:20

12-inch: Mercury / 880 929-1 (United States)

1. "Shout [US Remix]" – 8:02
2. "Shout [UK Remix]" – 7:40
3. "The Big Chair" – 3:20

CDV: Mercury / 080 064-2 (United Kingdom)

1. "Shout" – 5:53
2. "Everybody Wants to Rule the World [Urban Mix Edit]" – 5:20
3. "Shout [US Remix]" – 8:00
4. "Shout [Video]" – 6:00

== Personnel ==
Tears for Fears

- Roland Orzabal – lead and harmony vocals, Yamaha DX7, Fairlight CMI, lead and rhythm guitar, synth bass, E-mu Drumulator programming, LinnDrum programming
- Curt Smith – lead, harmony and backing vocals
- Ian Stanley – Hammond organ, Prophet-5, Fairlight CMI

Additional personnel

- Chris Hughes – producer, drums
- Sandy McLelland – backing vocals

== Charts ==
=== Weekly charts ===
Chart (1985)	Peak position
Australia (Kent Music Report)	1
Austria (Ö3 Austria Top 40)	6
Belgium (Ultratop 50 Flanders)	1
Canada Retail Singles (The Record)	1
Canada Top Singles (RPM)	1
Europe (Eurochart Hot 100)	1
France (SNEP)	21
Ireland (IRMA)	5
Italy (FIMI)	2
Netherlands (Dutch Top 40)	1
Netherlands (Single Top 100)	1
New Zealand (Recorded Music NZ)	1
Norway (VG-lista)	5
South Africa (Springbok Radio)	2
Sweden (Sverigetopplistan)	16
Switzerland (Schweizer Hitparade)	1
UK Singles (Official Charts)	4
US Billboard Hot 100	1
US Billboard 12-inch Singles Sales^{1}	1
US Billboard Dance/Disco Club Play^{1}	1
US Billboard Hot Black Singles	56
US Billboard Top Rock Tracks	6
US Cash Box	1
West Germany (GfK)	1

^{1}Remix

=== Year-end charts ===
Chart (1985)	Position
Australia (Kent Music Report)	14
Belgium (Ultratop)	14
Canada Top Singles (RPM)	8
Netherlands (Dutch Top 40)	10
Netherlands (Single Top 100)	6
New Zealand (RIANZ)	7
South Africa (Springbok Radio)	16
Switzerland (Schweizer Hitparade)	13
UK Singles (OCC)	50
US Billboard Hot 100	21
US Cash Box	13
West Germany (Media Control)	8

=== All-time charts ===
Chart (1958–2018)	Position
US Billboard Hot 100	391

== Certifications and sales ==
Region	Certification	Certified units/sales
Brazil (Pro-Música Brasil)	Gold	30,000^{‡}
Canada (Music Canada)	Platinum	100,000^{^}
New Zealand (RMNZ)	Platinum	30,000^{‡}
Spain (Promusicae)	Gold	30,000^{‡}
United Kingdom (BPI)	Gold	500,000^{‡}
United States (RIAA)	Gold	500,000^{^}
United States (RIAA) digital sales	Gold	500,000^{*}
^{*} Sales figures based on certification alone.^{^} Shipments figures based on certification alone.^{‡} Sales+streaming figures based on certification alone.

== Cover versions ==
"Shout" has been covered by various artists:

- Live, by American alternative rock band Concrete Blonde, on their single "Mexican Moon" (1994).
- American metal band Disturbed on their debut album The Sickness (2000), where they also make a reference to Vanilla Ice's "Ice Ice Baby" and Mötley Crüe's "Shout at the Devil", under the title "Shout 2000".
- Alexis Jordan's "Shout Shout", found on her 2011 self-titled debut album, is based on "Shout".
- A cover of "Shout" was included on the self-titled debut album by Scandroid. An official music video was released on 19 November 2016.
- Scottish electronic musician and producer Grum created a rework of the song in 2017 using lyrics from "Shout" in an electro-trance mix.
- In 2021, Italian artist Elisa covered "Shout" for the Sky Italia series Romulus. It was also featured on her 2022 album, "Ritorno al futuro".
- 2025, intro theme song to MGM+'s The Institute, covered by The Lumineers.

== Shout for England ==
In 2010, "Shout" was used as the basis for an unofficial anthem of the England football team in the 2010 FIFA World Cup. The new version, performed by Shout for England featuring Dizzee Rascal and James Corden, utilises elements from the Tears for Fears song amid new verses written specifically for the 2010 World Cup. The track also samples "No Diggity" by Blackstreet and was produced by Simon Cowell in association with TalkTalk. It was released on 9 June. On 13 June, the track entered the UK Singles Chart at No. 1.

== See also ==
- List of Billboard Hot 100 number-one singles of 1985
- List of Cash Box Top 100 number-one singles of 1985
- List of Dutch Top 40 number-one singles of 1985
- List of European number-one hits of 1985
- List of number-one dance singles of 1985 (U.S.)
- List of number-one hits of 1985 (Germany)
- List of number-one singles in Australia during the 1980s
- List of number-one singles of 1985 (Canada)
- List of number-one singles from the 1980s (New Zealand)
- List of number-one singles of the 1980s (Switzerland)
