= Everybody Wants to Rule the World =

1985 single by Tears for Fears

Single by Tears for Fears

from the album Songs from the Big Chair
- B-side: "Pharaohs"
- Released: 22 March 1985
- Recorded: 1984
- Studio: The Wool Hall (Beckington, Somerset, England)
- Genre: New wave; synth-pop
- Length: 4:12
- Label: Phonogram; Mercury; Vertigo
- Songwriters: Roland Orzabal; Ian Stanley; Chris Hughes
- Producer: Chris Hughes

Tears for Fears singles chronology
| "Shout" (1984) | "Everybody Wants to Rule the World" (1985) | "Head over Heels" (1985) |

Music video
- "Everybody Wants to Rule the World" on YouTube

"Everybody Wants to Rule the World" is a song by the English pop rock band Tears for Fears from their second studio album Songs from the Big Chair (1985). It was written by Roland Orzabal, Ian Stanley, and Chris Hughes and produced by Hughes. It was released on 22 March 1985, by Phonogram, Mercury, and Vertigo Records as the third single from the album. Philosophical in nature, "Everybody Wants to Rule the World" is a new wave and synth-pop song with lyrics that detail the desire humans have for control and power, and centres on themes of corruption.

An international success, the song peaked at number two in Ireland, Australia, and the United Kingdom and at number one in Canada, New Zealand, and on both the US Billboard Hot 100 and Cashbox. It was certified gold by both Music Canada (MC) and the British Phonographic Industry (BPI). Retrospectively, music critics have praised "Everybody Wants to Rule the World", with some ranking the song among the decade's best. Along with "Shout" (1984), it is one of the band's signature songs.

A music video received promotion from MTV. In 1986, the song won Best Single at the Brit Awards, and was re-recorded by the band as a charity single for the Sport Aid campaign the same year. "Everybody Wants to Rule the World" has been covered extensively since its release, most notably by New Zealand singer Lorde for the soundtrack to the film adaptation of The Hunger Games: Catching Fire (2013).

== Background and release ==
"Everybody Wants to Rule the World" was written by Roland Orzabal, Ian Stanley and Chris Hughes, and produced by Hughes. The song was a "last-minute" addition during recording sessions of Songs from the Big Chair (1985). The decision to include the song in the album came after Orzabal played two chords on his acoustic guitar for Hughes. It was recorded in two weeks and added as the final track on the album. According to Orzabal, the final line in the song's chorus, originally written as "Everybody wants to go to war", contributed to his indifference towards the track.

In an interview with Mix magazine, Hughes said that "as a piece of recording history, [the song is] bland as hell". Orzabal's unimpressed reaction to the track during their songwriting sessions prompted Hughes to convince him to record it, in a calculated effort to garner American chart success. After completing their sessions at 6 p.m., they would spend an hour reviewing each recording many times; this helped Orzabal to create the song's guitar figure and change its title. Orzabal acknowledged that the shuffle beat used in the song was "alien" to their way of writing music, stating it was "jolly rather than square and rigid in the manner of "Shout", but it continued the process of becoming more extrovert." In a 2025 podcast, Orzabal stated that the basic rhythm track had been inspired in part by Simple Minds' "Waterfront" and in part by Linx's 1981 hit "Throw Away the Key". Curt Smith, the song's lead singer, said the themes were "quite serious — it's about everybody wanting power, about warfare and the misery it causes." In an interview with Guitar World, Orzabal recalled that the vocals were pitched up, as they felt the melody was not fast enough.

"Everybody Wants to Rule the World" was first released on 22 March 1985 through Phonogram, Mercury and Vertigo Records as the third single from Songs from the Big Chair. The song was released for sale (as a 7-inch, 10-inch and 12-inch vinyl set), which included its B-side, interviews from the band and different versions of the song. To accommodate the vinyl release, a CD video set was also distributed and included the song's music video along with audios of bonus tracks.

== Composition and lyrical interpretation ==
"Everybody Wants to Rule the World"
An extract from the song

"Everybody Wants to Rule the World" is a new wave and synth-pop song. Sheet music for the song is set in the key of D major (original is slightly detuned) with a 12/8 time signature and a tempo of 112 beats per minute. The band stated that the driving shuffle rhythm was influenced by Simple Minds' 1983 song "Waterfront", and Linx's 1981 song "Throw Away the Key". "Everybody Wants to Rule the World" incorporates synthesizers, guitar, a shuffle groove, two guitar solos, and keyboards.

According to Joe Strummer (of The Clash) in a 1988 interview, he was in a restaurant and saw Orzabal, whereupon he told him that "you owe me a fiver", explaining that the title of "Everybody Wants to Rule the World" was an exact lift of the first line of the middle eight in "Charlie Don't Surf". According to Strummer, Orzabal simply reached into his pocket and gave him a five pound note. The song's lyrics detail the desire humans have for control and power. In 2017, Tal Rosenberg of Pitchfork stated that its lyrics could be applied in different scenarios such as the environment ("Turn your back on mother nature"), short-lived financial success ("Help me make the most of freedom and of pleasure/Nothing ever lasts forever"), dictatorial rule ("Even while we sleep/We will find you"), and the Cold War ("Holding hands while the walls come tumbling down").

The song's lyrics have elicited different political interpretations. A writer for The Economist called the track "a Cold War anthem" and noted its "timeless message", stating that "the song's lyrics speak to the anxieties of every age". Marc Ambinder from The Atlantic used the lyrics "Say that you'll never, never, never need it / One headline, why believe it? / Everybody wants to rule the world" in his article about the United States government's use of "original classified authority" and the abuse of power between the branches of government. Dominic Pino of National Review described the track as a "conservative pop song", noting the lyrics' tension between "personal ambition" and "channeling that personal ambition to good ends", comparing these themes to James Madison's concerns about private interest in the Federalist Papers. Curt Smith challenged this interpretation.

Tears for Fears revisited the song and its message in a 2017 interview with Yahoo! Music, stating that the song's themes were still "just as poignant" as they were when they first wrote it. They mentioned that they discussed the Cold War with "Everybody Wants to Rule the World" and Songs from the Big Chair but that was the "U.S. and Russia then, and now the concern is more with the U.S. and [North] Korea."

== Reception and legacy ==
Consequence of Sound editor Michael Roffman praised the group for being able to produce a "timeless and influential composition" with minimal effort. Roffman also noted that "Everybody Wants to Rule the World" was appropriate when it was first released, calling it a "meditative commentary on an era that was so corrupt economically and spiritually." AllMusic's Stanton Swihart expressed in his retrospective review that the group "perfectly captured the zeitgeist of the mid-'80s while impossibly managing to also create a dreamy, timeless pop classic." Pitchfork called it a song with "near-universal appeal", as well as a staple for "classic-rock radio, pharmacies, bars, and parties". In their review for the best albums of the 1980s, Eric Henderson from Slant Magazine stated that the song "seems like one of the great indictments of the materialism and false triumphalism of the decade."

"Everybody Wants to Rule the World" was voted the 25th best single in The Village Voice's Pazz & Jop critics' poll for 1985 with 17 points, sharing the spot with Tom Petty and the Heartbreakers' "Don't Come Around Here No More" (1985) and Sade's "Smooth Operator" (1984). Pitchfork placed the song at number 82 on their list for the best songs of the 80s expressing that "underneath the synth-pop sheen, its vague message" and its lesson in how power-driven society could be, the song was able to reach "Reagan and Margaret-era youth fed up with political greed". Kevin Korber from Spectrum Culture ranked the song at 24 on his 80s decade list, calling the song a "testament to how much of a free-for-all the pop landscape was in the 1980s". Korber dismissed the song's vague lyrics but praised its complex melodic structure, saying it was "both the perfect representation of its time and a timeless composition". Treble included the song at number 49 on their decade list. In 2021, Rolling Stone ranked the song at number 319 in their updated list of the 500 Greatest Songs of All Time.

In 1986, the song won "Best Single" at the Brit Awards. Orzabal argued that the song deserved to win the Ivor Novello International Hit of the Year award, claiming that the winner—"19" by Paul Hardcastle—was not an actual song, but only a "dialogue collage". In 2015, 30 years after its release, the song was honoured at the annual BMI Awards in London for achieving 6 million radio airplays. "Everybody Wants to Rule the World" is regarded as the group's signature song, along with "Shout" (1984).

"Everybody Wants to Rule the World" was banned for broadcast by the BBC for the duration of the first Gulf War (2 August 1990 – 28 February 1991) due to the song's political themes. For several years, the song was used as the title theme to the political HBO talk show, Dennis Miller Live. It was also featured in the 1985 film Real Genius.

== Commercial performance ==
In the United Kingdom, "Everybody Wants to Rule the World" debuted at number 16 on the UK Singles Chart, in the issue dated 24 March 1985. On the week of 14 April 1985, the song peaked at number two, where it stayed for an additional week, both times being blocked from the top spot by "We Are the World" by USA for Africa. "Everybody Wants to Rule the World" re-entered the UK Singles Chart several times between 2022 and 2026 and received a quintuple platinum certification by the British Phonographic Industry (BPI) on 30 January 2026 for 3,000,000 sales. In addition, as of May 2023, it is the 12th most streamed song from the 1970s, 1980s, and 1990s by British artists in the United Kingdom. The song peaked at number three in Belgium, and at number two in both the Netherlands and Ireland.

In the United States, "Everybody Wants to Rule the World" debuted at number 70 on the Billboard Hot 100 in the issue dated 16 March 1985. On the week of 27 April 1985, the song rose to number 18. On the week of 8 June 1985, the song moved to #1, replacing Wham!'s "Everything She Wants" (1984) on the chart; it would spend a total of two weeks in this position. The song was a commercial success in other American markets, peaking at number two on the Adult Contemporary and Top Rock Tracks and charting at number one on the Hot Dance Club Play, Hot Dance Music/Maxi-Singles Sales, and Cash Box charts. It ranks as the 345th best-charting single of all time in the United States. In Canada, the song reached the number one spot, earning a gold certification from Music Canada (MC) for 40,000 sales shipments on 1 May 1985.

In Australia, the song reached the number two position. On the report dated 19 May 1985, the song debuted at number four on the New Zealand Top 40 Singles chart; it would later peak at number one. It was certified Gold by the Recorded Music NZ (RMNZ) for sales of 10,000.

== B-side: "Pharaohs" ==
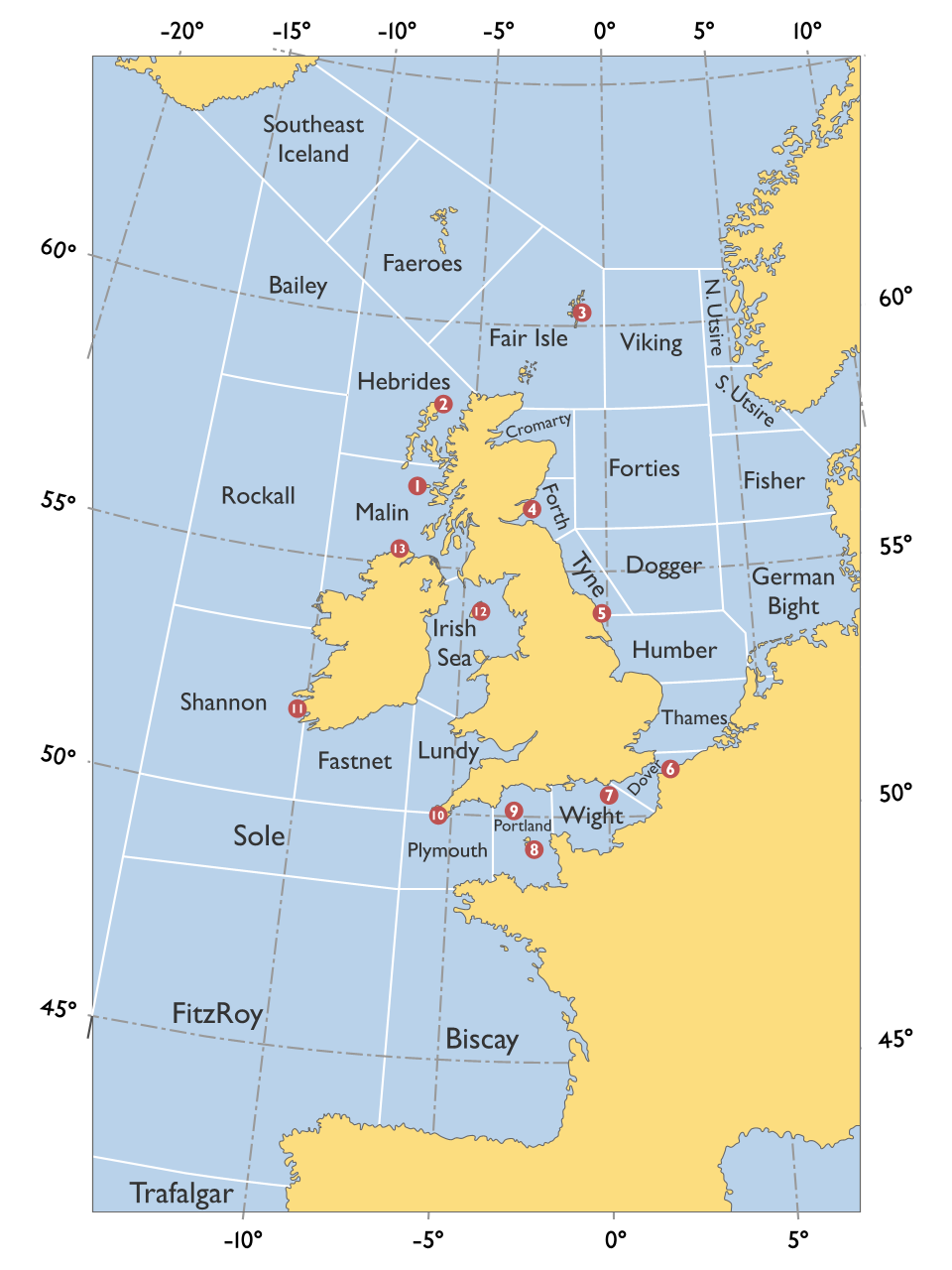
"Pharaohs" uses a 1984 recording of Brian Perkins reading a shipping forecast on various North Sea locations (pictured).

"Pharaohs" is the B-side to the "Everybody Wants to Rule the World" single. It samples a recording of BBC Radio 4 announcer Brian Perkins reading the Shipping Forecast for the North Sea region of the United Kingdom. The title of the song has an identical enunciation to the Faroe Islands ("Faroes"), one of the places referenced in the forecast. Orzabal, Ian Stanley, Curt Smith and Hughes share writing credits. "Pharaohs" is included on the Groove Armada compilation album Back to Mine (2000). Chris Hughes wrote about the song in the liner notes of Saturnine Martial & Lunatic (1996), saying:

No matter how horrifying the conditions may really be, the voice reading the shipping forecast is deliberately calm and relaxed. Recorded at the Wool Hall for the B-side of 'Everybody' in a calm and relaxed way.

"Pharaohs" shipping forecast read by Brian Perkins:

There are warnings of gales in Viking, Forties, Cromarty, Forth, Fisher, Dover, Wight, Portland, Plymouth, Finisterre, Sole, Lundy, Fastnet, Shannon, Rockall, Malin, Hebrides, Bailey, Fair Isle, Faroes and Southeast Iceland.
The general synopsis at one eight double-O: low just north of Viking, nine double-seven, moving steadily east-northeast.
Low 300 miles south of Iceland. Atlantic low forming, moving steadily northeast.
A ridge of high pressure has swayed between North and South Utsire. The area forecast for the next twenty-four hours. Viking, Forties, Cromarty, Forth.

== Music video ==
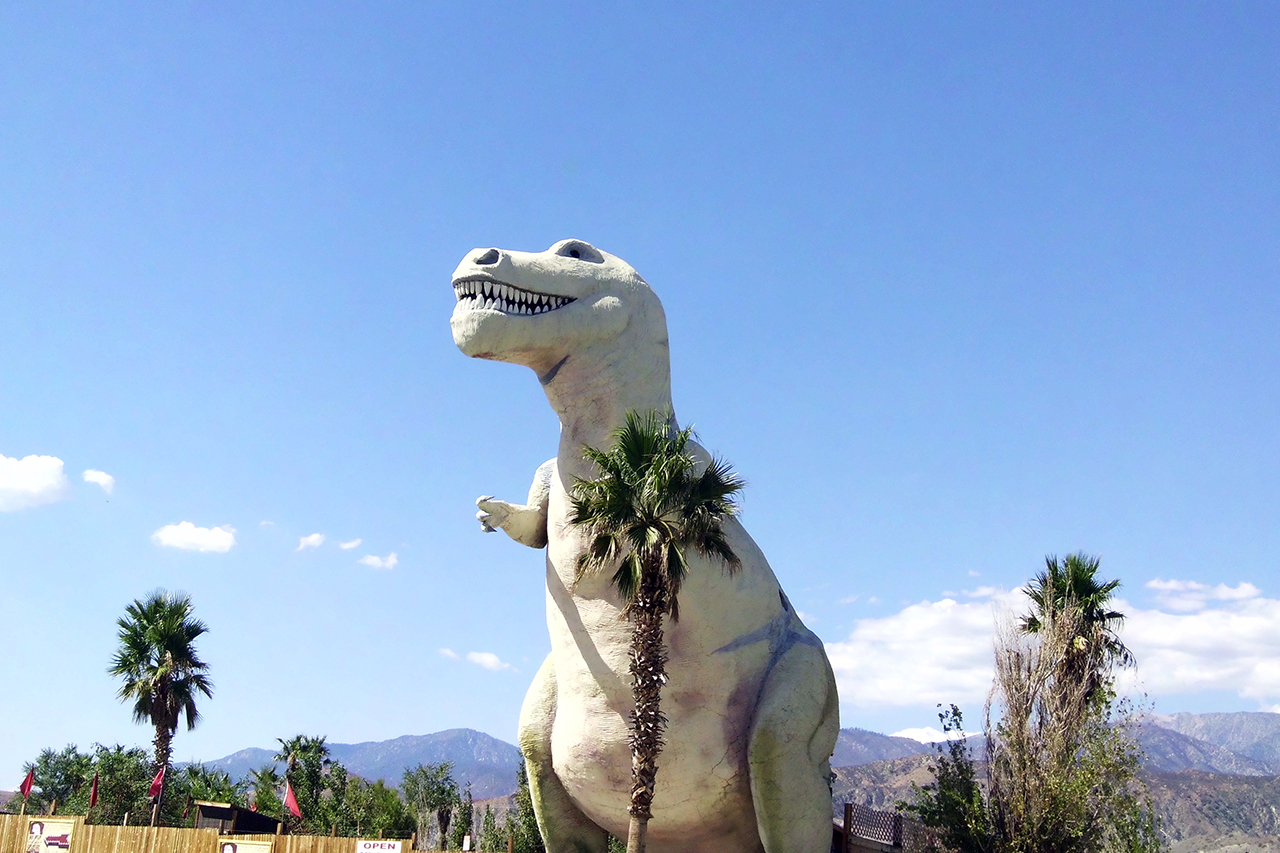
The roadside attraction Cabazon Dinosaurs (pictured) is shown briefly in the video.

The video for "Everybody Wants to Rule the World" was directed by Nigel Dick. It was filmed in Los Angeles, Desert Hot Springs, Palm Springs, and Cabazon, California. Curt Smith admitted to Pitchfork that the video shoot was a "disaster"; Dick was "in tears" on the second night of shooting. Smith also mentioned that there was an accident while filming the "dirt bikes and four-wheel [sic] off-road vehicles" scene, with one child flying out of a vehicle and smashing his head, leaving him unconscious.

The video begins with Smith driving a vintage Austin-Healey 3000 sports car while a toddler points toy guns in Smith's direction. The car is then seen driving through a desert, on Interstate 10; this scene is intercut with the band performing the song in a studio. In the chorus, a plane is seen. Smith parks the car at the Wheel Inn diner and makes a call from a telephone booth. The camera pans to show a statue of a prospector and his donkey in the foreground. Smith leaves the diner in the car while singing the song's lyrics. The following scene shows two men in suits performing synchronised dance movements in front of two gas pumps. Shots of young people riding three-wheeled ATVs and dirt bikes through desert sand dunes are also shown. Smith is then shown singing in the desert wearing black sunglasses as many of the dirt bike and ATV riders approach from behind him and pass to either side.

The music video promoted the group in America, due to heavy rotation on the music video channel MTV. HuffPost editor Daryl Deino ranked the video at number three on their year-end list for best music videos of 1985 stating that the video "represents pure Americana as it was in 1985". Deino also mentioned that the video "proves that at times, artists were able to do so much with so little."

== Formats and track listings ==
- 7-inch: Mercury / IDEA 9 (UK)
1. A. "Everybody Wants to Rule the World" – 4:11
2. B. "Pharaohs" – 3:42
- Double 7-inch Special Limited Edition: Mercury / IDEA 99 (UK)
1. A. "Everybody Wants to Rule the World" – 4:11
2. B. "Pharaohs" – 3:42
3. A. "Everybody Wants to Rule the World" (Urban Mix) – 6:06
4. B. "Roland & Curt Interviewed" – 7:30
- 10-inch: Mercury / IDEA 910 (UK)
1. A. "Everybody Wants to Rule the World" – 4:11
2. B. "Pharaohs" – 3:42
- 12-inch: Mercury / IDEA 912 (UK)
1. A. "Everybody Wants to Rule the World" (Extended Version) – 5:43
2. B1. "Everybody Wants to Rule the World" (7" Version) – 4:11
3. B2. "Pharaohs" – 3:42
- Urban Mix 12-inch: Mercury / IDEA 912 (UK)
1. A. "Everybody Wants to Rule the World" (Urban Mix) – 6:06
2. B. "Everybody Wants to Rule the World" (Instrumental) – 4:26
- CD Video: Mercury / 080 032-2 (UK, PAL)
1. "Everybody Wants to Rule the World" (Audio) – 4:10
2. "The Marauders" (Audio) – 4:13
3. "When in Love With a Blind Man" (Audio) – 2:22
4. "Pharaohs" (Audio) – 3:39
5. "Everybody Wants to Rule the World" (Video) – 4:41
- CD Video: Mercury / 870 745-2 (US, NTSC)
1. "Everybody Wants to Rule the World" (Audio) – 4:10
2. "The Marauders" (Audio) – 4:13
3. "When in Love With a Blind Man" (Audio) – 2:22
4. "Pharaohs" (Audio) – 3:39
5. "Everybody Wants to Rule the World" (Video) – 4:41

== Personnel ==
Personnel are adapted from the original album liner notes, the liner notes of Saturnine Martial & Lunatic, Reverb Machine, and Mix.

Tears for Fears

- Roland Orzabal – electric and acoustic guitars, guitar solo (first), Yamaha DX7 and Prophet T-8 synthesizers, backing vocals
- Curt Smith – PPG Wave synth-bass, lead vocals
- Ian Stanley – Yamaha DX7 and Fairlight CMI synthesizers, LinnDrum and Oberheim DMX programming
- Manny Elias – drums, Oberheim DMX programming

Additional personnel

- Neil Taylor – electric and acoustic guitars, guitar solo (second)
- Chris Hughes – producer, Oberheim DMX and MIDI programming
- Dave Bascombe – engineer

== Charts ==
=== Weekly charts ===
Weekly chart performance for "Everybody Wants to Rule the World"
| Chart (1985) | Peak position |
|---|---|
| Australia (Kent Music Report) | 2 |
| Austria (Ö3 Austria Top 40) | 19 |
| Belgium (Ultratop 50 Flanders) | 3 |
| Canada Retail Singles (The Record) | 1 |
| Canada Adult Contemporary (RPM) | 1 |
| Canada Top Singles (RPM) | 1 |
| France (SNEP) | 18 |
| Ireland (IRMA) | 2 |
| Netherlands (Dutch Top 40) | 2 |
| Netherlands (Single Top 100) | 2 |
| New Zealand (Recorded Music NZ) | 1 |
| South Africa (Springbok Radio) | 14 |
| Switzerland (Schweizer Hitparade) | 13 |
| UK Singles (Official Charts) | 2 |
| US Billboard Adult Contemporary | 2 |
| US Billboard Hot 100 | 1 |
| US Billboard 12-inch Singles Sales | 1 |
| US Billboard Dance/Disco Club Play | 1 |
| US Billboard Top Rock Tracks | 2 |
| US Cash Box Top 100 | 1 |
| West Germany (GfK) | 11 |

2021–2026 weekly chart performance for "Everybody Wants to Rule the World"
| Chart (2021–2026) | Peak position |
|---|---|
| Global 200 (Billboard) | 49 |
| Portugal (AFP) | 111 |
| Sweden Heatseeker (Sverigetopplistan) | 2 |
| US Hot Rock & Alternative Songs (Billboard) | 9 |

=== Year-end charts ===
1985 year-end chart performance for "Everybody Wants to Rule the World"
| Chart (1985) | Position |
|---|---|
| Australia (Kent Music Report) | 36 |
| Belgium (Ultratop 50 Flanders) | 31 |
| Canada Top Singles (RPM) | 19 |
| Netherlands (Dutch Top 40) | 20 |
| Netherlands (Single Top 100) | 31 |
| New Zealand (RIANZ) | 9 |
| UK Singles (OCC) | 24 |
| US Billboard Hot 100 | 7 |
| US Billboard Adult Contemporary | 23 |
| US Billboard Top Rock Tracks | 24 |
| US Cash Box Top 100 | 3 |
| West Germany (Media Control) | 66 |

2023 year-end chart performance for "Everybody Wants to Rule the World"
| Chart (2023) | Position |
|---|---|
| Global 200 (Billboard) | 94 |
| UK Singles (OCC) | 53 |

2024 year-end chart performance for "Everybody Wants to Rule the World"
| Chart (2024) | Position |
|---|---|
| Global 200 (Billboard) | 90 |
| UK Singles (OCC) | 86 |

2025 year-end chart performance for "Everybody Wants to Rule the World"
| Chart (2025) | Position |
|---|---|
| Global 200 (Billboard) | 107 |
| UK Singles (OCC) | 99 |

== Certifications ==
| Region | Certification | Certified units/sales |
|---|---|---|
| Australia (ARIA) | 5× Platinum | 350,000^{‡} |
| Brazil (Pro-Música Brasil) | Platinum | 60,000^{‡} |
| Canada (Music Canada) | Gold | 50,000^{^} |
| Denmark (IFPI Danmark) | Platinum | 90,000^{‡} |
| Germany (BVMI) | Platinum | 600,000^{‡} |
| Italy (FIMI) | Platinum | 100,000^{‡} |
| New Zealand (RMNZ) | 7× Platinum | 210,000^{‡} |
| Portugal (AFP) | 3× Platinum | 75,000^{‡} |
| Spain (Promusicae) | Platinum | 60,000^{‡} |
| United Kingdom (BPI) | 5× Platinum | 3,000,000^{‡} |
^{^} Shipments figures based on certification alone.^{‡} Sales+streaming figures based on certification alone.

== Covers and re-releases ==
=== "Everybody Wants to Run the World" ===
"Everybody Wants to Run the World"

Single by Tears for Fears
- Released: 23 May 1986
- Length: 4:30
- Label: Phonogram; Mercury
- Songwriters: Roland Orzabal; Ian Stanley; Chris Hughes
- Producer: Tears for Fears

Tears for Fears singles chronology
| "I Believe (A Soulful Re-Recording)" (1985) | "Everybody Wants to Run the World" (1986) | "Mothers Talk [US remix]" (1986) |

"Everybody Wants to Run the World" is a re-recording of the band's song "Everybody Wants to Rule the World". The reworked single was released in May 1986 as the theme song for the Sport Aid campaign, a charitable event held to raise money for famine relief in Africa. It was a success in the UK Singles Chart, becoming the band's sixth top 5 hit, peaking at number 5 in June 1986. The song also reached number 4 in Ireland.

| Chart (1986) | Peak position |
|---|---|
| Ireland (IRMA) | 4 |
| UK Singles (Official Charts) | 5 |

=== Lorde version ===
"Everybody Wants to Rule the World"

Song by Lorde

from the album The Hunger Games: Catching Fire
- Released: 15 November 2013
- Genre: Industrial; downtempo
- Length: 2:35
- Label: Republic; Mercury
- Songwriters: Roland Orzabal; Ian Stanley; Chris Hughes
- Producers: Peter Shurkin; Joel Little

New Zealand singer Lorde recorded a cover of the song for the soundtrack of The Hunger Games: Catching Fire (2013). The cover was produced by Peter Shurkin and Joel Little with arrangement by Michael A. Levine and Lucas Cantor. Orzabal praised Lorde for reinventing the cover, stating that the group finds it interesting when artists take what they do and reinterpret it. For their Rule the World Tour, the duo uses this version to launch their show.

Critics were positively receptive to the cover, some praised it for its darker atmosphere mood although others criticized it for stripping away the song's original upbeat composition. David Haglund from Slate stated that while the song "doesn't top the great original, it does memorably reinvent it". Sam Lansky from Idolator called the cover "haunting and melodramatic". Conversely, Stereogum editor Nate Patrin criticized the chorus and production but praised the "aloof strangeness" in Lorde's vocals for being able to carry the song "past the usual Dramatic Reenvisionings". Paste and Exclaim! included the cover in their respective 2013 year-end lists for covers, while the former ranked it 13th on their decade-end list for covers. Her cover appeared on the New Zealand Singles Chart at number 14. It reached number 53 in Australia, number 65 in the United Kingdom, number 93 in France, and number 27 on the U.S. Hot Rock Songs chart.

==== Weekly charts ====
| Chart (2013–2014) | Peak position |
|---|---|
| Australia (ARIA) | 53 |
| France (SNEP) | 93 |
| New Zealand (Recorded Music NZ) | 14 |
| UK Singles (Official Charts) | 65 |
| US Hot Rock & Alternative Songs (Billboard) | 27 |

==== Certifications ====
| Region | Certification | Certified units/sales |
|---|---|---|
| Australia (ARIA) | Platinum | 70,000^{‡} |
| Canada (Music Canada) | Platinum | 80,000^{‡} |
| New Zealand (RMNZ) | Gold | 15,000^{‡} |
| United Kingdom (BPI) | Silver | 200,000^{‡} |
^{‡} Sales+streaming figures based on certification alone.

=== Other well-known versions ===
Ted Leo and the Pharmacists covered the song in 2010 for the inaugural episode of The A.V. Club's A.V. Undercover web series.

Relient K recorded a version of the song for their 2011 cover album Is for Karaoke.

Weezer covered the song on their 2019 self-titled cover album. They were joined by Orzabal and Smith to perform the song live at Coachella 2019 on April 14, and again two days later on Jimmy Kimmel Live!.

Filipino indie rock band Hey June! released a cover version as a single in 2024.

The song was interpolated by Miley Cyrus for a remix of "Black Skinhead" by Kanye West which leaked online in January 2016.

American rapper Lil Baby sampled the song in "The World is Yours to Take" for the Budweiser anthem of the 2022 FIFA World Cup in Qatar and also appeared on the FIFA World Cup Qatar 2022 Official Soundtrack.

The song appears at the end of Despicable Me 4, where Gru and Maxime Le Mal are in prison putting on a talent show for all of the prisoners, featuring several villains from the franchise. The cover version, performed by the film's cast, also appears on the movie's soundtrack.

The song was later covered in 2026 by British Singer Harry Styles at the BBC Live Lounge.

== See also ==
- List of Billboard Hot 100 number-one singles of 1985
- List of Cash Box Top 100 number-one singles of 1985
- List of number-one dance singles of 1985 (U.S.)
- List of number-one singles of 1985 (Canada)
- List of number-one singles from the 1980s (New Zealand)
