= The Seeds of Love =

Studio album by Tears for Fears
- Released: 25 September 1989
- Recorded: Late 1986 – July 1989
- Studios: Real World (Box, Wiltshire); Townhouse (London)
- Genres: Pop rock; neo-psychedelia; progressive pop; sophisti-pop; jazz rock
- Length: 49:37
- Label: Fontana
- Producers: Tears for Fears; Dave Bascombe

Tears for Fears chronology
Songs from the Big Chair (1985)	The Seeds of Love (1989)	Tears Roll Down (Greatest Hits 82–92) (1992)

Singles from The Seeds of Love
- 1. "Sowing the Seeds of Love" Released: 21 August 1989; 2. "Woman in Chains" Released: 6 November 1989; 3. "Advice for the Young at Heart" Released: 19 February 1990; 4. "Famous Last Words" Released: 6 August 1990

The Seeds of Love is the third studio album by the English pop rock band Tears for Fears, released on 25 September 1989 by Fontana Records. It retained the band's epic sound while incorporating influences ranging from jazz and soul to Beatlesque pop. Its lengthy production and scrapped recording sessions cost over £1 million. The album spawned the title hit single "Sowing the Seeds of Love", as well as "Woman in Chains", and "Advice for the Young at Heart", all of which reached the top 40 in several countries.

The Seeds of Love was an international success, entering the UK Albums Chart at number one, and top ten in other countries including the United States. It has been certified Gold or Platinum in several territories including the United Kingdom, the US, France, Germany, Canada, and the Netherlands. Despite its success, personal tensions during recording led to band members Curt Smith and Roland Orzabal splitting up at the conclusion of their 1990 world tour, with Orzabal remaining as the band's sole official member until the two reunited in the early 2000s.

In October 2020, the remastered reissue of The Seeds of Love was released in several formats including a super deluxe edition, with B-sides, remixes, and a 5.1 surround sound mix. Further deluxe editions were released in October 2026. Among these were multiple vinyl releases, including a 2LP blue marble coloured vinyl edition with alternate cover art, a single LP orange/red sunburst coloured vinyl edition featuring a new remastered mix of the album, a black vinyl edition, a new Blu-ray audio release featuring seven remastered versions of the album including an updated 5.1 mix and new Dolby Atmos remastered version of the album, and a 3CD edition.

== Production ==
The first song composed for The Seeds of Love was "Badman's Song" (originally titled "The Bad Man Song"), written during the band's 1985 world tour after Roland Orzabal overheard two members of the tour personnel maligning him in a hotel room one night. The song was co-written by Orzabal with keyboardist Nicky Holland, who was touring with the band throughout 1985. Holland would go on to play an integral part in the writing and recording of The Seeds of Love, much as keyboardist Ian Stanley had on the band's previous album Songs from the Big Chair.

Recording sessions for the album began in late 1986 with producers Clive Langer and Alan Winstanley, but Orzabal and Curt Smith were unhappy with the results and so the recordings were scrapped in early 1987. Chris Hughes (who had produced both the previous Tears for Fears albums) was then brought back into the fold, but again conflicts arose over the direction of the new material. Orzabal in particular had grown weary of composing and playing music using machines and sequencers, as the majority of Tears for Fears' music had been up to that point, and was striving for something more organic and a different way of working.

"As a band, we came from the programmed pop era of the early '80s and we had inherited a sense of structure that permeated almost all our music. The way we were working was becoming too sterile. We wanted to do something more colourful, something that sounded big and warm. You cannot get that from machines. You only get that with real musicians and real players."

— Curt Smith, in Adrian Thrills, The Seeds of Love, Page 6

The song "Sowing the Seeds of Love" was written in June 1987, the same week as the UK general election in which Margaret Thatcher and the Conservative Party won a third consecutive term in office (reflected in the lyric "Politician granny with your high ideals, have you no idea how the majority feels?"). Hughes and keyboardist Stanley both left the project later in 1987 citing "creative differences", though their contributions to the track remained on the final album. After two failed attempts to make the album, the band opted to produce it themselves, assisted by engineer Dave Bascombe. Also in 1987, Orzabal and Smith flew over to the US to track down a hotel lounge pianist/vocalist named Oleta Adams, whom they had seen playing in Kansas City during their 1985 American tour. Hoping she could add to the organic feel by bringing a soulful warmth to their music, they invited Adams to work with them on their new album. Adams would ultimately perform on three tracks ("Woman in Chains", "Badman's Song" and "Standing on the Corner of the Third World"), and a solo recording contract was also offered to her by the band's record company Fontana.

Recording recommenced in early 1988 and lasted until the summer of 1989. Featuring an assortment of respected session players including drummers Manu Katché and Simon Phillips, bassist Pino Palladino, and a guest appearance by Phil Collins on drums, much of the album was recorded as jam sessions featuring different performances of the music and then edited down later. Some of the tracks, particularly "Badman's Song", were recorded several times in a variety of musical styles including, according to Holland, versions of the song that were reminiscent of Barry White, Little Feat and Steely Dan before settling on the jazz/gospel version that is on the finished album. Co-producer Dave Bascombe commented that the final version of the song was almost nothing like the original demo because it had gone through so many changes. The track "Swords and Knives" was originally written for the 1986 film Sid and Nancy (about the relationship between Sid Vicious and Nancy Spungen), but was rejected by the filmmakers for not being "punk" enough.

Due to the starry cast of session players and lengthy production process, including the scrapped earlier recordings, the album reportedly cost £1 million to make (by comparison, Songs from the Big Chair cost approximately £70,000). The final mix of the album was completed at London's Mayfair Studios in July 1989. Frustrations during the making of the album had also given rise to tensions between Orzabal and Smith, Orzabal having become something of an intricate perfectionist and Smith preoccupied with living a jet set lifestyle rather than focusing on the album (Smith's first marriage had also ended in divorce during the making of the album). At one point, Orzabal considered calling the album Famous Last Words (the title of the album's final track), commenting "it may well turn out to be our last album." Indeed, the duo did not make any further recordings together for over a decade.

== Release ==
Now assigned to the newly reactivated Phonogram subsidiary label Fontana, the first single from the album, "Sowing the Seeds of Love", was released in August 1989. It became a worldwide hit, peaking at number 5 in the UK, number 2 in the US, and number 1 in Canada. The album was released in September 1989, entering the UK Albums Chart at number 1 and would be certified Platinum by the BPI within three weeks. In the US, it peaked at number 8 and was also certified Platinum. The album reached the top ten in numerous other countries around the world.

Two other singles from the album, "Woman in Chains" (recorded as a duet with Adams) and "Advice for the Young at Heart" (the only track featuring Smith on lead vocals) reached the Top 40 in UK and internationally. "Famous Last Words" was released as fourth single in mid-1990 by the record company without the band's involvement, though this only peaked at number 83 in the UK. A video compilation, Sowing the Seeds, featuring the promo videos for the first three singles from the album was also released in 1990.

The band embarked on a world tour to promote the album in 1990, featuring Adams both as a support act and as a player with the band (her solo album, Circle of One, produced by Orzabal and Dave Bascombe was also released during this time). The band's concert at the Santa Barbara County Bowl in May 1990 was filmed and released on home video, titled Going to California.

A 64-page companion book to the album, entitled Tears for Fears – The Seeds of Love, was also released in 1990 by Virgin Books and offers insight into the writing and recording process behind the album as well as the sheet music for each song and rare promotional photographs from the period.

The album was remastered and reissued in 1999 with four bonus tracks which were originally B-sides to the album's first three singles. It does not include the B-side "My Life in the Suicide Ranks" which was an additional B-side to "Woman in Chains" and could at the time only be found on the band's 1996 rarities compilation Saturnine Martial & Lunatic. The Seeds of Love was re-released again in 2020 in five different formats including a 5-disc super deluxe edition boxed set featuring bonus material such as single versions, B-sides (this time including "My Life in the Suicide Ranks"), demos, outtakes, and a 5.1 surround-sound mix, again made by Steven Wilson, who also was responsible for the surround mix for Songs from the Big Chair. Other editions released at the same time include a 2-CD deluxe edition, a single CD edition, a vinyl album, and a vinyl picture disc album. The deluxe edition peaked at number 13 on the UK Albums Chart in October 2020. A further reissue peaked at number 19 on the UK Albums Chart in October 2026.

== Critical reception ==
Professional ratings
Review scores
Source	Rating
AllMusic	4/5 stars
Chicago Tribune	3.5/4 stars
Classic Rock	9/10
Los Angeles Times	2.5/5 stars
NME	5/10
Pitchfork	7.2/10
Q	5/5 stars
Record Collector	4/5 stars
Rolling Stone	4/5 stars
Uncut	8/10

Lloyd Bradley praised The Seeds of Love in Q, summarising the album as "such a radical departure from Tears for Fears' robust, anthemic pop songs of the early '80s as to make them seem irrelevant." In Rolling Stone, Michael Azerrad wrote, "If with the title track Tears for Fears beg comparison to the Beatles, it's in the unspoken assertion that popular music can also be outstanding music. That's something this remarkable record proves over and over again." Greg Kot of the Chicago Tribune described the album as "astonishing", with a "wide open, soulful spaciousness that belies the heavy production expenses". Los Angeles Times critic Chris Willman enjoyed the first three songs but lamented the "uncharacteristically frenzied rock 'n' roll climaxes" and "underdeveloped and overwrought" lyrics among the later tracks, describing the album as overall "just so-so". Simon Williams, writing for NME, perceived The Seeds of Love as a self-consciously "'adult' and 'mature'" effort and found that Tears for Fears had "tumbled from joyful pop simplicity to cliche-ridden complexity."

In a retrospective review for AllMusic, Stanton Swihart observed the album's "polished, atmospheric soul", labelling it "the apotheosis of Orzabal and Smith's evolution". A review of the 1999 reissue by AllMusic's Bruce Eder pointed towards "the best vocals in Tears for Fears' history" and "their most ambitious production". Appraising the 2020 reissue for Record Collector, John Earls alluded to Orzabal's "obsessive determination to achieve Steely Dan levels of technical perfection", while crediting his "melodic gifts" with preventing the album from "becoming too overblown". On the other hand, Ira Robbins of Trouser Press had praise for the title track and Adams's soulful vocals, but described the bulk of the album as "absurdly overintellectualized" and "almost impenetrable".

== 30th anniversary reissue ==
Following the reissue campaigns of The Hurting (2013) and Songs from the Big Chair (2014), in October 2020, the remastered super deluxe edition of The Seeds of Love was released in several formats, including B-sides, remixes, 22 previously unreleased recordings, and a 5.1 surround sound mix.

Paul Sinclair, founder and head editor of the website SuperDeluxeEdition, co-compiled the track listing and interviewed band members, producers and collaborators for the extensive sleeve notes of the edition.

== Track listing ==
No.	Title	Writer(s)	Length
1.	"Woman in Chains" (featuring Oleta Adams)	Roland Orzabal	6:31
2.	"Badman's Song"	Orzabal; Nicky Holland	8:32
3.	"Sowing the Seeds of Love"	Orzabal; Curt Smith	6:19
4.	"Advice for the Young at Heart"	Orzabal; Holland	4:50
5.	"Standing on the Corner of the Third World"	Orzabal	5:33
6.	"Swords and Knives"	Orzabal; Holland	6:13
7.	"Year of the Knife"	Orzabal; Holland	7:08
8.	"Famous Last Words"	Orzabal; Holland	4:28
Total length:			49:42

1999 reissue bonus tracks
No.	Title	Writer(s)	Length
9.	"Tears Roll Down" (B-side to "Sowing the Seeds of Love")	Orzabal; Dave Bascombe	3:16
10.	"Always in the Past" (B-side to "Woman in Chains")	Orzabal; Ian Stanley	4:38
11.	"Music for Tables" (B-side to "Advice for the Young at Heart")	Orzabal	3:32
12.	"Johnny Panic and the Bible of Dreams" (additional B-side to "Advice for the Young at Heart")	Orzabal	4:17
Total length:			64:45

Note

- A remix of "Johnny Panic and the Bible of Dreams" was also released as a separate single in the UK in 1991 and reached number 70 on the UK Singles Chart and number one on the UK Dance Chart.

=== 2020 Super Deluxe Edition ===
Disc two – The Sun (45s & B-Sides)
No.	Title	Length
1.	"Sowing the Seeds of Love" (7″ version)	5:43
2.	"Tears Roll Down"	3:16
3.	"Woman in Chains" (7″ version)	5:28
4.	"Always in the Past"	4:38
5.	"My Life in the Suicide Ranks"	4:32
6.	"Woman in Chains" (instrumental)	6:30
7.	"Advice for the Young at Heart" (7″ version)	4:49
8.	"Johnny Panic and the Bible of Dreams" (instrumental)	4:18
9.	"Music for Tables"	3:32
10.	"Johnny Panic and the Bible of Dreams" (mix one)	6:22
11.	"Johnny Panic and the Bible of Dreams" (mix two)	5:55
12.	"Sowing the Seeds of Love" (US radio edit)	4:04
13.	"Woman in Chains" (US radio edit 1)	4:42
14.	"Advice for the Young at Heart" (Italian radio edit)	3:40
15.	"Year of the Knife" (Canadian single version)	5:40
16.	"Johnny Panic and the Bible of Dreams"	4:17
Total length:		77:26

Disc three – The Moon (Radio Edits & Early Mixes)
No.	Title	Length
1.	"Year of the Knife" (overture)	1:47
2.	"Year of the Knife" (early mix – instrumental)	8:50
3.	"Sowing the Seeds of Love" (alternate mix)	7:22
4.	"Tears Roll Down" (alternate mix)	4:07
5.	"Year of the Knife" (Steve Chase 7″ remix)	4:29
6.	"Badman's Song" (early mix)	7:56
7.	"Advice for the Young at Heart" (instrumental)	4:56
8.	"Year of the Knife" ("the mix")	6:55
9.	"Johnny Panic and the Bible of Dreams" (mix one edit)	3:43
10.	"Sowing the Seeds of Love" (early mix – instrumental)	5:55
11.	"Woman in Chains" (US radio edit 2)	4:19
12.	"Year of the Knife" (Canadian single version – instrumental)	5:40
13.	"Famous Last Words" (French radio edit)	3:07
14.	"Woman in Chains" (reprise – electric piano only)	6:39
Total length:		74:19

Disc four - The Wind (Demos, Diversions & Jams)
No.	Title	Length
1.	"Rhythm of Life" (demo)	5:12
2.	"Advice for the Young at Heart" (demo)	4:52
3.	"Swords and Knives" (demo)	3:51
4.	"Famous Last Words" (demo)	4:12
5.	"Sowing the Seeds of Love" (demo – instrumental)	6:06
6.	"Badman's Song" (Langer/Winstanley version – instrumental)	7:30
7.	"Woman in Chains" (Townhouse Jam)	7:06
8.	"Broken" (Townhouse Jam)	1:37
9.	"Rhythm of Life" (Townhouse Jam)	3:09
10.	"Badman's Song" (Townhouse Jam)	8:17
11.	"Badman's Song" (reprise – Townhouse Jam)	2:50
12.	"Standing on the Corner of the Third World" (Townhouse Jam)	9:09
Total length:		63:12

== Personnel ==
Tears for Fears

- Roland Orzabal – lead vocals (1–3, 5–8), backing vocals, guitars, keyboards, Fairlight programming
- Curt Smith – bass guitar, backing vocals, co-lead vocals (3), lead vocals (4)
- Ian Stanley – keyboards and Hammond organ (1, 3, 10)

Additional personnel

- Oleta Adams – keyboards, vocals (1, 2), acoustic piano (2, 5), backing vocals (5, 12)
- Nicky Holland – keyboards, backing vocals (2, 4, 7), acoustic piano (4, 6, 8), Kurzweil strings (8)
- Simon Clark – keyboards, synthesizers (2, 5), Hammond organ (2, 4, 5, 7)
- Neil Taylor – guitar arpeggio (1), rhythm guitar (7)
- Robbie McIntosh – lead guitar (2, 7), slide guitar (2)
- Randy Jacobs – guitar
- Pino Palladino – bass (1, 2, 5)
- Phil Collins – drums (1 from 3:32)
- Manu Katché – drums (1 until 3:32, 2, 5)
- Chris Hughes – drums and production (3, 10)
- Simon Phillips – drums (7 from 5:04)
- Luís Jardim – percussion
- Carole Steele – percussion (2, 5)
- Richard Niles – orchestral arrangements (3)
- Jon Hassell – trumpet (5, 8)
- Peter Hope-Evans – harmonica (5)
- Kate St John – saxophone (6), oboe (6)
- Tessa Niles – backing vocals (2, 5, 7), female vocal (6)
- Carol Kenyon – backing vocals (2, 5, 7)
- Maggie Ryder – backing vocals (4)
- Dolette McDonald – backing vocals (7)
- Andy Caine – backing vocals (7)

== Production ==
- Producers – Tears for Fears and David Bascombe
- Engineer – David Bascombe
- Additional engineer – Steve Chase
- Assistant engineers – Heidi Canova and Lee Curle
- Mixing – Bob Clearmountain (tracks 1 and part of 7), David Bascombe (tracks 2–6, part of 7, and 8).
- Mastering – Bob Ludwig
- Art direction and photography – David Scheinmann
- Oleta Adams' photo – Jeff Katz
- Design – Stylorouge

== Charts ==
=== Weekly charts ===
Weekly chart performance for The Seeds of Love
Chart (1989)	Peak position
Australian Albums (ARIA)	18
Austrian Albums (Ö3 Austria)	13
Canada Top Albums/CDs (RPM)	5
Dutch Albums (Album Top 100)	7
European Albums (Music & Media)	3
Finnish Albums (Suomen virallinen lista)	27
French Albums (SNEP)	3
German Albums (Offizielle Top 100)	5
Irish Albums (IFPI)	1
Italian Albums (Musica e dischi)	5
Japanese Albums (Oricon)	13
New Zealand Albums (RMNZ)	4
Norwegian Albums (VG-lista)	14
Spanish Albums (AFYVE)	13
Swedish Albums (Sverigetopplistan)	5
Swiss Albums (Schweizer Hitparade)	8
UK Albums (Official Charts)	1
US Billboard 200	8

Weekly chart performance for The Seeds of Love (2020 deluxe edition)
Chart (2020)	Peak position
Scottish Albums (Official Charts)	8
UK Albums (Official Charts)	13

Weekly chart performance for The Seeds of Love (2026 reissue)
Chart (2026)	Peak position
Croatian International Albums (HDU)	33
German Pop Albums (Offizielle Top 100)	12
Scottish Albums (Official Charts)	4
UK Albums (Official Charts)	19

=== Year-end charts ===
1989 year-end chart performance for The Seeds of Love
Chart (1989)	Position
Australian Albums (ARIA)	94
Canada Top Albums/CDs (RPM)	38
Dutch Albums (Album Top 100)	47
European Albums (Music & Media)	46
UK Albums (Gallup)	27

1990 year-end chart performance for The Seeds of Love
Chart (1990)	Position
Canada Top Albums/CDs (RPM)	58
Dutch Albums (Album Top 100)	78
European Albums (Music & Media)	45
German Albums (Offizielle Top 100)	61
US Billboard 200	66

== Certifications ==
Certifications for Seeds of Love
Region	Certification	Certified units/sales
Australia (ARIA)	Gold	35,000^{^}
Brazil (Pro-Música Brasil)	Gold	100,000^{*}
Canada (Music Canada)	2× Platinum	200,000^{^}
France (SNEP)	Platinum	300,000^{*}
Germany (BVMI)	Gold	250,000^{^}
Hong Kong (IFPI Hong Kong)	Gold	10,000^{*}
Netherlands (NVPI)	Gold	50,000^{^}
Spain (Promusicae)	Gold	50,000^{^}
Switzerland (IFPI Switzerland)	Gold	25,000^{^}
United Kingdom (BPI)	Platinum	300,000^{^}
United States (RIAA)	Platinum	1,000,000^{^}
^{*} Sales figures based on certification alone.^{^} Shipments figures based on certification alone.
