= Laurie Lewis (photographer) =

British photographer

- Born: 1944 (age 81–82)
- Education: Walthamstow College of Art; Royal College of Art
- Occupations: Photographer, filmmaker
- Known for: 1970s rock music portraits, theatre photography

Laurie Lewis (born 1944) is a British photographer and filmmaker known for his portrait photographs of 1970s rock musicians and theatre photography.

== Early life and education ==
Lewis was born in 1944. At sixteen years old, Lewis began studying at Walthamstow College of Art alongside fellow pupils Terry Day and Viv Stanshall. At the end of his first year, the school saw a change in its teaching style as the lecturers retired and were replaced by younger tutors including William Green, Peter Blake and Fred Cuming. He later described his four years at the school as "the hardest I ever worked in anything, ever".

After leaving Walthamstow in 1964, Lewis began studying film at the Royal College of Art.

== Career ==
In the 1970s, Lewis began working with the photographic printer Michael Spry at his darkrooms in London. Spry developed several works by Lewis including his portrait of the dancer Rudolf Nureyev.

Lewis's theatre photography has been printed in The Independent since the 1980s. His work has also been used to advertise performances at the Royal Opera House. In 2003, he wrote the screenplay for the documentary Gandolfi - Family Business, which focused on the titular family of field camera makers. It was directed by the photographer Ken Griffiths and his brother David.

=== Collections ===
As of June 2024, the National Portrait Gallery in London holds sixteen prints created by Lewis. The works feature celebrities including rock musicians Mick Jagger, Rod Stewart and Ian Dury; the politician Michael Foot; and the fashion designer Vivienne Westwood with her son Joseph Corré.
