= Songs from the Big Chair =

Studio album by Tears for Fears
- Released: 1 March 1985
- Recorded: 1983–1984 (Note: "Mothers Talk (U.S. remix)" recorded 1986)
- Venue: Hammersmith Odeon (London) (Note: "Broken (Live)" recorded December 1983)
- Studios: Ian Stanley's home studio, North Road in Bath, Somerset, England
- Genres: New wave; pop rock; progressive pop; synth-pop
- Length: 41:52
- Labels: Mercury; Phonogram
- Producer: Chris Hughes

Tears for Fears chronology
The Hurting (1983)	Songs from the Big Chair (1985)	The Seeds of Love (1989)

Singles from Songs from the Big Chair
- 1. "Mothers Talk" Released: 10 August 1984; 2. "Shout" Released: 23 November 1984; 3. "Everybody Wants to Rule the World" Released: 22 March 1985; 4. "Head over Heels" Released: 14 June 1985; 5. "I Believe (A Soulful Re-Recording)" Released: 4 October 1985; 6. "Mothers Talk (US remix)" Released: 1 April 1986

Songs from the Big Chair is the second studio album by the English pop rock band Tears for Fears, released in the UK on 1 March 1985 by Phonogram Records and Mercury Records, followed by a US release on 11 March 1985. The follow-up to the band's successful debut album, The Hurting (1983), Songs from the Big Chair marked a departure from that album's dark, introspective style, featuring a more mainstream, glossy sound, with sophisticated production values, increased guitar use, and diverse stylistic influences, while Roland Orzabal and Ian Stanley's lyrics reflected socially and politically conscious themes.

The album peaked at number two in the UK and at number one in the US, becoming a multi-platinum seller in several countries and the band's most successful album to date. The singles "Shout" and "Everybody Wants to Rule the World" both topped the US Billboard Hot 100 and reached the top 5 of the UK singles chart, while "Head over Heels", "Mothers Talk", and a re-recorded version of "I Believe" were also successful internationally. Receiving positive critical reviews upon release, Songs from the Big Chair has accrued lasting praise and has been named one of the best albums of the 1980s, and was included in the book 1001 Albums You Must Hear Before You Die (2006).

== Background ==
The album was to be titled The Working Hour, but Roland Orzabal thought to change it to Songs from the Big Chair, a title derived from the 1976 American television film Sybil about a woman with multiple personality disorder who only feels safe when sitting in her analyst's "big chair." The title, according to Curt Smith, reflects both the distinct personalities of each song on the album, and the band's opinion that they were the targets of a hostile British music press at the time.

In an interview for the 2006 deluxe-version booklet, Smith noted: "We were very introverted on The Hurting; it was a very dark album. We found the need to be more outgoing on The Big Chair."

The band started to generate new material for their second album in 1983. The first songs written for the new album were "Mothers Talk", "Head over Heels", and "The Working Hour", which the band played live during their December 1983 tour, as captured on the In My Mind's Eye concert performance video.

== Writing and recording ==
The album was recorded at The Wool Hall (the band's own studio) in 1984. Conceptually and musically, it further developed the band's sound from the previous album The Hurting (1983), expanding the use of guitars in addition to their electronic sound and imparting a wider approach overall. "Mothers Talk", which was released months before the album as a single, was originally recorded in early 1984 with producer Jeremy Green, but was discarded as the record company disliked it, eventually bringing The Hurting co-producer Chris Hughes back into the fold. Hughes helped bring the band out of the “synthesizer rut” they found themselves in to develop a more guitar-oriented sound for the album. Recording officially began in April 1984, with the album taking eight months to complete, including a month of mixing at Union Studios in Munich. Both singles "Mothers Talk" and "Shout" would take the longest to complete, taking up to half the album's production time.

The album utilises many styles and influences, and progressive rock was cited as a primary influence on the album. "I Believe" was influenced by the songwriting of Robert Wyatt, and was originally intended for him to record but the band recorded it themselves. "Broken" is a reworking of the earlier "We Are Broken" and a studio version and a live reprise bookends the song "Head over Heels". The largely instrumental "Listen" has been described as a symphonic piece. Lyrically, the psychological themes on The Hurting were continued and extended to include a variety of themes such as politics, war, money, and love.

Near the end of the completion of the album, Roland Orzabal played two simple chords on his acoustic guitar that formed the foundation of the song "Everybody Wants to Rule the World". Although he was initially not interested in working on it, Orzabal was convinced to write a song based on the two chords and he added the chorus line. The song was completed in about a week and was the last track recorded for the album.

== Release ==
Songs from the Big Chair was released on 1 March 1985 with a black and white photograph of Orzabal and Smith on the record cover. LP copies retained a mixing error in which the left and right stereo channels were swapped; this was corrected for most CD editions. The sole exception was a 1998 reissue by Mobile Fidelity Sound Lab, which retained the LP stereo imaging.

The album reached number two on the UK Albums Chart and spawned several commercially successful singles, including two top 5 hits: "Mothers Talk" (UK No. 14), "Shout" (UK No. 4), "Everybody Wants to Rule the World" (UK No. 2), "Head over Heels" (UK No. 12), and "I Believe" (UK No. 23).

The radio-friendly "Everybody Wants to Rule the World" marked the band's breakthrough in the United States; both this single and its follow-up, "Shout", reached number one on the US Billboard Hot 100. Songs from the Big Chair also reached number one on the Billboard 200 and sold five million copies in the US alone. In the UK, it spent 79 consecutive weeks on the album chart, remaining on the chart for 18 months until September 1986.

To mark the album's 30th anniversary, Universal Music released Songs from the Big Chair in five different formats on 10 November 2014.

In November 2025, Songs from the Big Chair was released in a special edition to celebrate its 40th anniversary; this edition features the cover of the record that was originally planned but was ultimately not retained. This reissue reached the top 20 in the UK.

== Critical reception ==
=== Contemporary ===
Professional ratings
Review scores
Source	Rating
Los Angeles Times	2/4 stars
The Philadelphia Inquirer	2/4 stars
Record Mirror	3.5/5 stars
Smash Hits	8/10
Sounds	4.5/5 stars
The Village Voice	B

Songs from the Big Chair received generally positive reviews. Comparing it with The Hurting, Johnny Waller of Sounds said that "Tears for Fears have lovingly crafted a new masterpiece with softer, smoky vocals, more tempting melodies and less abrasive rhythms", concluding that "within accepted confines, Tears for Fears are stretching and growing, expanding both their imagination and their horizons." Smash Hits critic Ian Cranna found that the band's "looser, more exploratory" approach resulted in songs of "unflinching lyrical honesty" and "touching vulnerability", while in Melody Maker, Barry McIlheney called it "an album that fully justifies the rather sneering, told-you-so looks adopted by Curt Smith and Roland Orzabal on the sleeve". In NME, Danny Kelly praised Songs from the Big Chair as "a calculated and brilliant peak, a quintessence of polished pop putty ... perfect at its shimmering surface, worthless to its craven core." He described it as a descendant of 10cc's The Original Soundtrack (1975) and Pink Floyd's The Dark Side of the Moon (1973)–a "product of obsessional care and attention to (often unnecessary) detail".

Eleanor Levy was more ambivalent in Record Mirror, finding Songs from the Big Chair produced too "slickly" at points and stating that Tears for Fears "come up with the occasional classic, but they can't carry this through a whole album. Not yet". Don Shewey of Rolling Stone found the band derivative of acts such as U2, Echo & the Bunnymen, and XTC but complimented the album's "sparkling" production, ultimately deeming its songs "more interesting for their textures than for their melodies or lyrics." The Village Voice's Robert Christgau felt that while its music and lyrics showed "substance", the record is "not so much pretentious as portentous, promising a depth and drama English lads have been falling short on since the dawn of progressive rock."

=== Retrospective ===
Professional ratings
Review scores
Source	Rating
AllMusic	5/5 stars
The Encyclopedia of Popular Music	4/5 stars
The Great Rock Discography	7/10
Mojo	4/5 stars
MusicHound Rock	4.5/5 stars
Music Story	4/5 stars
Pitchfork	8.9/10
Q	4/5 stars
The Rolling Stone Album Guide	3/5 stars
Tom Hull – on the Web	B

Professional ratings
30th anniversary edition
Review scores
Source	Rating
Classic Rock	4/5 stars
Consequence	A+
The Guardian	3/5 stars
PopMatters	4/10
Record Collector	5/5 stars
Spectrum Culture	3.0/5
Spill Magazine	3/5 stars

Calling it "an artistic tour de force", AllMusic reviewer Stanton Swihart said that Songs from the Big Chair "heralded a dramatic maturation in the band's music, away from the synth-pop brand with which it was (unjustly) seared following the debut, and towards a complex, enveloping pop sophistication." He added that "Orzabal and Smith's penchant for theorizing with steely-eyed austerity was mistaken for harsh bombasticism in some quarters, but separated from its era, the album only seems earnestly passionate and immediate". In a 2006 piece for Stylus Magazine, Andrew Unterberger wrote that "even today, when all rock musicians seem to be able to do is be emotional and honest, the brutality and power of Songs from the Big Chair's catharsis is still quite shocking." Michael Roffman of Consequence credited Tears for Fears for managing to create an album that, although more commercial than their previous work, "actually feels more expansive and sprawling and adventurous".

In his review for Pitchfork, Tal Rosenberg reflected that "in the same way that Fleetwood Mac's Rumours conveys the lonely narcissism and hedonism of the '70s, or Love's Forever Changes captures both the bliss and the ominousness of the Summer of Love", Songs from the Big Chair "manages to exude the 1980s" with its "personal psychology, meticulous compositions, and world-sized choruses", which all "evoked the loss of control in an overwhelming era". Similarly, Mark Elliott from Record Collector commented that the album and its "high-gloss" sound "captured the mid-80s zeitgeist perfectly." Roffman noted its usage of novel production techniques for its time such as MIDI programming and sampling and argued that "such sonic tinkering pushed Tears for Fears ahead of their colleagues, elevating the outfit as a legitimate forerunner of pop music", while also observing that the album's songs had endured "far past the crazy '80s, instead becoming essential anthems for generations yet to come."

Songs from the Big Chair has appeared in several professional lists of the best albums of the 1980s. The album was ranked 95th by Slant Magazine, 87th by Pitchfork, and 47th by Paste. It was also included in the book 1001 Albums You Must Hear Before You Die. In February 2020, the album was the focus of an episode of the BBC's Classic Albums documentary series. The episode included new interviews with key personnel including Orzabal, Smith, Stanley, Hughes, engineer Dave Bascombe, Oleta Adams, John Grant, and A&R man David Bates.

== Track listing ==
Side one
No.	Title	Writer(s)	Length
1.	"Shout"	Roland Orzabal; Ian Stanley	6:32
2.	"The Working Hour"	Orzabal; Stanley; Manny Elias	6:30
3.	"Everybody Wants to Rule the World"	Orzabal; Stanley; Chris Hughes	4:10
4.	"Mothers Talk"	Orzabal; Stanley	5:09

Side two
No.	Title	Writer(s)	Length
5.	"I Believe"	Orzabal	4:53
6.	"Broken"	Orzabal	2:38
7.	"Head over Heels/Broken (Live)"	Orzabal; Curt Smith	5:00
8.	"Listen"	Stanley; Orzabal	6:48
Total length:			41:52

== Personnel ==
Tears for Fears

- Roland Orzabal – vocals, keyboards, guitars (all but 5), synth bass (1), LinnDrum programming (1), grand piano (5)
- Curt Smith – vocals, bass guitar (2, 4–8), synth bass (3)
- Ian Stanley – keyboards, LinnDrum programming, arrangements (9)
- Manny Elias – drums (2–7), drum arrangement (2)

Additional personnel

- "Shout": Chris Hughes – drums, Sandy McLelland – backing vocals
- "The Working Hour": Andy Davis – grand piano, Mel Collins – saxophone, Will Gregory – saxophone solos, Jerry Marotta – percussion and saxophone arrangements
- "Everybody Wants to Rule the World": Neil Taylor – second guitar solo, Chris Hughes – LinnDrum and MIDI programming
- "Mothers Talk": Stevie Lange – backing vocals
- "I Believe": Will Gregory – saxophone
- "Broken": Neil Taylor – guitar solo
- "Head Over Heels": Andy Davis – grand piano, Marilyn Davis – backing vocals, Annie McCaig – backing vocals, Sandy McLelland – backing vocals
- "Listen": Marilyn Davis – operatic vocal
- "The Big Chair": samples dialogue from the film Sybil (1976)

Production and artwork

- Chris Hughes – producer
- Dave Bascombe – engineer
- Tim O'Sullivan – cover photography

== Charts ==
=== Weekly charts ===
Weekly chart performance for Songs from the Big Chair
Chart (1985)	Peak position
Australian Albums (Kent Music Report)	5
Austrian Albums (Ö3 Austria)	22
Canada Top Albums/CDs (RPM)	1
Dutch Albums (Album Top 100)	1
European Albums (Music & Media)	5
Finnish Albums (Suomen virallinen lista)	11
German Albums (Offizielle Top 100)	1
Italian Albums (Musica e dischi)	6
Japanese Albums (Oricon)	13
New Zealand Albums (RMNZ)	2
Norwegian Albums (VG-lista)	17
Spanish Albums (AFYVE)	18
Swedish Albums (Sverigetopplistan)	25
Swiss Albums (Schweizer Hitparade)	5
UK Albums (Official Charts)	2
US Billboard 200	1

Weekly chart performance for Songs from the Big Chair (30th Anniversary Edition)
Chart (2014)	Peak position
German Albums (Offizielle Top 100)	79
UK Albums (Official Charts)	95

Weekly chart performance for Songs from the Big Chair (35th Anniversary Reissue)
Chart (2020–2021)	Peak position
Belgian Albums (Ultratop Flanders)	126
Scottish Albums (Official Charts)	14
UK Albums (Official Charts)	87

Weekly chart performance for Songs from the Big Chair (40th Anniversary Reissue)
Chart (2025)	Peak position
Scottish Albums (Official Charts)	5
UK Albums (Official Charts)	20

Weekly chart performance for Songs from the Big Chair (40th Anniversary Reissue)
Chart (2025)	Peak position
Belgian Albums (Ultratop Flanders)	95
Belgian Albums (Ultratop Wallonia)	63

=== Year-end charts ===
1985 year-end chart performance for Songs from the Big Chair
Chart (1985)	Position
Australian Albums (Kent Music Report)	6
Canada Top Albums/CDs (RPM)	2
Dutch Albums (Album Top 100)	8
European Albums (Music & Media)	7
German Albums (Offizielle Top 100)	24
New Zealand Albums (RMNZ)	8
Swiss Albums (Schweizer Hitparade)	25
UK Albums (Gallup)	5
US Billboard 200	10

1986 year-end chart performance for Songs from the Big Chair
Chart (1986)	Position
European Albums (Music & Media)	85
UK Albums (Gallup)	66
US Billboard 200	19

== Certifications and sales ==
Certifications for Songs from the Big Chair
Region	Certification	Certified units/sales
Australia	—	150,000
Brazil	—	200,000
Canada (Music Canada)	7× Platinum	700,000^{^}
France (SNEP)	Gold	100,000
Germany (BVMI)	Gold	250,000^{^}
Hong Kong (IFPI Hong Kong)	Platinum	20,000^{*}
Netherlands (NVPI)	Platinum	100,000^{^}
New Zealand (RMNZ)	2× Platinum	30,000^{‡}
United Kingdom (BPI)	3× Platinum	900,000^{^}
United States (RIAA)	5× Platinum	5,000,000^{^}
Summaries
Worldwide	—	9,000,000
^{*} Sales figures based on certification alone.^{^} Shipments figures based on certification alone.^{‡} Sales+streaming figures based on certification alone.
