= Tip =

Tip or TIP may refer to:

== Common meanings ==
- Tip (gambling)
- Tip (gratuity)
- Tip (law enforcement)

== Science and technology ==
- Tank-infantry phone, allowing communication with a tank's crew
- Targeted intervention program, a type of medication therapy management
- Telecom Infra Project, an industry collaborative community
- Tip, one of the conductors in a tip and ring telephone connector
- TIP, a terminal indecomposable past set in a causal structor
- Texas Instruments Power, a series of transistors
- Titanium(III) phosphide, a semiconductor
- Treatise on Invertebrate Paleontology
- TM Forum Integration Program, a framework of Frameworx

=== Computing ===
- tip (Unix utility), a software program for remote terminal sessions
- Terminal Interface Processor, a server used to provide computer terminal access to the ARPANET
- Tertiary Ideographic Plane, a range of ideographic characters in the Unicode standard
- Threat Intelligence Platform, technology used to consolidate computer security data
- TIP, now GNU nano, a text editor

== Music ==
- Tip (rapper) or T.I. (born 1980), American rapper
- Tip (album), 1997, by Finger Eleven
- T.I.P. (album), 2005 by Young Buck
- The Tip (album), 1995, by David Murray

== People ==
- Tippu Tip (1837–1905), Swahili-Zanzibari slave trader
- Tip Htila, 19th-20th century Burmese princess and businesswoman
- Princess Ozma or Tip, a character in The Marvelous Land of Oz by L. Frank Baum
- Tip (nickname)

== Places ==
- Pajinka, known in English as "The Tip," the northernmost point of Cape York, Queensland, Australia
- Tripoli International Airport, by IATA airport code
- Tianjin South railway station, China Railway telegraph code TIP

== Politics ==
- The Independent Party, a political party in Kenya
- Thurrock Independents Party, in the United Kingdom
- Tigray Independence Party, in Ethiopia
- Transition Integrity Project, a group concerned with the 2020 US presidential election
- Turkistan Islamic Party
- Türkiye İşçi Partisi or Workers Party of Turkey, any of several organizations

== Schools ==
- Textile Institute of Pakistan
- Technological Institute of the Philippines

== Sports ==
- Tip (ice hockey), the redirection of a shot on net
- The Tip (American football), an American football play
- Tip, of Tip and Tap, a 1974 FIFA World Cup mascot
- Team Impulse or TiP, a North American League of Legends esports team

== Other uses ==
- Tip (sculpture), in Milwaukee, Wisconsin
- The Tip (film), a 1918 Harold Lloyd silent comedy short
- Rubbish tip or landfill
- Square dance tip, a round of two dances in square dancing
- TIP Group, a transportation company
- Tip TV, an Albanian TV channel for children and teenagers
- Talent Identification Program, a gifted education program at Duke University
- Trafficking in Persons Report

== See also ==
- Tip of the iceberg (disambiguation)
- Hat tip, an expression of recognition or gratitude
- List of typhoons named Tip
- Tipped-in page (or tip-in), a separately-printed page added to a book
- Spoil tip, mining waste material
- Advice (opinion)
- Tipp (disambiguation)
- Tipping (disambiguation)
- Tipping point (disambiguation)
- Tips (disambiguation)
