= The Tipping Point World Tour =

2022–23 concert tour by Tears for Fears

- Tour by Tears for Fears
- Tour poster for North American dates
- Location: North America; Europe
- Associated album: The Tipping Point (2022)
- Start date: 20 May 2022
- End date: 2 August 2023
- Legs: 2
- No. of shows: 22 in North America; 6 in Europe; 28 in total
- Supporting acts: Garbage; Alison Moyet; Cold War Kids

Tears for Fears concert chronology
- Rule the World Tour (2018–2019); The Tipping Point World Tour (2022–2023); ...

The Tipping Point World Tour was a concert tour by English pop rock band Tears for Fears. The tour supported the group's seventh studio album The Tipping Point (2022). The tour began at the Riverbend Music Center in Cincinnati on 20 May 2022, and concluded at the Hollywood Bowl in Los Angeles on 2 August 2023. The tour was supported by American band Garbage and Cold War Kids in the United States, and English singer Alison Moyet of Yazoo in the United Kingdom.

The tour faced numerous cancelled dates starting from 9 July 2022, owing to Tears for Fears member Curt Smith sustaining a rib injury. All remaining dates of the 2022 tour were eventually cancelled on 15 July 2022.

On 3 April 2023, the band announced an additional North American leg with Cold War Kids on support, called the Tipping Point Tour Part II.

== Set list ==
This set list is representative of the 2 July 2022 show in Warminster. It does not represent all dates throughout the tour.

1. "No Small Thing"
2. "The Tipping Point"
3. "Everybody Wants to Rule the World"
4. "Secret World" (with elements of "Let 'Em In" by Wings)
5. "Sowing the Seeds of Love"
6. "Long, Long, Long Time"
7. "Break the Man"
8. "My Demons"
9. "Rivers of Mercy"
10. "Mad World"
11. "Suffer the Children"
12. "Woman in Chains"
13. "Badman's Song"
14. "Pale Shelter"
15. "Break It Down Again"
16. "Head over Heels" / "Broken"
  Encore
17. "End of Night"
18. "Change"
19. "Shout"

== Shows ==
List of concerts, showing date, city, country, venue, and opening acts
Date	City	Country	Venue	Opening act(s)
Leg 1 — North America
20 May 2022	Cincinnati	United States	Riverbend Music Center	Garbage
21 May 2022	Cuyahoga Falls	United States	Blossom Music Center	Garbage
24 May 2022	Irving	United States	The Pavilion at Toyota Music Factory	Garbage
25 May 2022	Sugar Land	United States	Smart Financial Centre	Garbage
27 May 2022	Phoenix	United States	Ak-Chin Pavilion	Garbage
29 May 2022	Denver	United States	Levitt Pavilion	Garbage
1 June 2022	Concord	United States	Concord Pavilion	Garbage
2 June 2022	Mountain View	United States	Shoreline Amphitheatre	Garbage
4 June 2022	Inglewood	United States	Kia Forum	Garbage
5 June 2022	Chula Vista	United States	North Island Credit Union Amphitheatre	Garbage
9 June 2022	West Palm Beach	United States	iTHINK Financial Amphitheatre	Garbage
10 June 2022	Tampa	United States	MidFlorida Credit Union Amphitheatre	Garbage
12 June 2022	Alpharetta	United States	Ameris Bank Amphitheatre	Garbage
13 June 2022	Charlotte	United States	PNC Music Pavilion	Garbage
15 June 2022	Clarkston	United States	Pine Knob Music Theatre	Garbage
16 June 2022	Tinley Park	United States	Hollywood Casino Amphitheatre	Garbage
17 June 2022	Noblesville	United States	Ruoff Music Center	Garbage
19 June 2022	Columbia	United States	Merriweather Post Pavilion	Garbage
21 June 2022	Philadelphia	United States	TD Pavilion at the Mann	Garbage
22 June 2022	Boston	United States	Leader Bank Pavilion	Garbage
24 June 2022	Holmdel	United States	PNC Bank Arts Center	Garbage
25 June 2022	Wantagh	United States	Northwell Health at Jones Beach Theater	Garbage
Leg 2 — Europe
1 July 2022	Telford	England	QE II Arena	Alison Moyet
2 July 2022 (Note: The show on 2 July 2022 was part of the "Live at Longleat" concert series.)	Warminster	England	Longleat House	Alison Moyet
4 July 2022 (Note: The show on 4 July 2022 was an extra date announced in February 2022, and did not feature Alison Moyet.)	London	England	O2 Shepherd's Bush Empire	—N/a
5 July 2022	Aylesbury	England	Waddesdon Manor	Alison Moyet
7 July 2022	Newcastle upon Tyne	England	Utilita Arena	Alison Moyet
8 July 2022	Kelso	Scotland	Floors Castle	Alison Moyet
Leg 3 — North America
23 June 2023	Atlantic City	United States	Estess Arena	Cold War Kids
24 June 2023	Uncasville	United States	Mohegan Sun Arena	Cold War Kids
26 June 2023	New York City	United States	Madison Square Garden	Cold War Kids
29 June 2023	Toronto	Canada	Budweiser Stage	Cold War Kids
30 June 2023	Laval	Canada	Place Bell	Cold War Kids
2 July 2023	Saratoga Springs	United States	Saratoga Performing Arts Center	Cold War Kids
5 July 2023	Bethel, NY	United States	Bethel Woods Center for the Arts	Cold War Kids
7 July 2023	Virginia Beach	United States	Veterans United Home Loans Amphitheater	Cold War Kids
8 July 2023	Raleigh	United States	Coastal Credit Union Music Park at Walnut Creek	Cold War Kids
11 July 2023	Franklin, TN	United States	FirstBank Amphitheater	Cold War Kids
13 July 2023	St. Louis	United States	Hollywood Casino Amphitheatre	Cold War Kids
14 July 2023	Kansas City	United States	Starlight Theatre	Cold War Kids
16 July 2023	Houston	United States	Cynthia Woods Mitchell Pavilion	Cold War Kids
17 July 2023	Austin	United States	Moody Center	Cold War Kids
20 July 2023	Denver	United States	Ball Arena	Cold War Kids
22 July 2023	Portland	United States	RV Inn Style Resorts Amphitheater	Cold War Kids
24 July 2023	Vancouver	Canada	Rogers Arena	Cold War Kids
26 July 2023	Bend	United States	Hayden Homes Amphitheater	Cold War Kids
27 July 2023	Seattle	United States	Climate Pledge Arena	Cold War Kids
29 July 2023	Sacramento	United States	Toyota Amphitheatre	Cold War Kids
1 August 2023	Palm Springs	United States	Acrisure Arena	Cold War Kids
2 August 2023	Los Angeles	United States	Hollywood Bowl	Cold War Kids

=== Cancelled shows ===
List of cancelled concerts, showing date, city, country, venue, reason for cancellation, and ref.
Date	City	Country	Venue	Reason	Ref.
9 July 2022 (Note: The cancelled show on 9 July 2022 was part of Lytham Festival. Additional act Natalie Imbruglia and "special guest" Alison Moyet still performed.)	Lytham St Annes	England	The Proms Arena	"Serious rib injury" sustained by Curt Smith	
12 July 2022	Derby	England	The Incora County Ground	"Serious rib injury" sustained by Curt Smith	
14 July 2022	Leeds	England	Millennium Square	"Serious rib injury" sustained by Curt Smith	
15 July 2022	Warwick	England	Warwick Castle	"Serious rib injury" sustained by Curt Smith	
16 July 2022	Scarborough	England	Scarborough Open Air Theatre	"Serious rib injury" sustained by Curt Smith	
19 July 2022	New Milton	England	Chewton Glen Hotel and Spa	Recovery from rib injury	
20 July 2022	Canterbury	England	The Spitfire Ground	Recovery from rib injury	
22 July 2022	Hove	England	The 1st Central County Ground	Recovery from rib injury	
23 July 2022	Cardiff	Wales	Cardiff Castle	Recovery from rib injury	
24 July 2022	Hatfield	England	Hatfield House	Recovery from rib injury	
26 July 2022	Exeter	England	Powderham Castle	Recovery from rib injury	
