= Songs for a Nervous Planet =

Live album by Tears for Fears
- Released: 25 October 2024
- Genre: Pop
- Length: 1:46:01 (standard edition); 1:51:06 (extra studio track edition)
- Label: Concord

Tears for Fears chronology
The Tipping Point (2022)	Songs for a Nervous Planet (2024)

Singles from Songs for a Nervous Planet
- 1. "The Girl That I Call Home" Released: 12 September 2024; 2. "Astronaut" Released: 4 October 2024; 3. "Say Goodbye to Mum and Dad" Released: 29 November 2024

Songs for a Nervous Planet is a live album (Note: Although Songs for a Nervous Planet is classified as a live album, it includes four (five on some special versions) new studio tracks, those being "Astronaut", "Emily Said", "Say Goodbye to Mum and Dad", "The Girl That I Call Home", and the bonus track, "Landlocked" on certain editions. (See earlier text in parentheses.)) by the English rock/pop band Tears for Fears. Released in October 2024, the album features live recording of the band's concert at the FirstBank Amphitheater in Franklin, Tennessee on 11 July 2023, one of the dates on their Tipping Point World Tour. In addition to the 18 live tracks, the album includes four new studio tracks (five on the deluxe edition).

Songs for a Nervous Planet peaked at number 6 on the UK Albums Chart, becoming the band's seventh UK top 10 album.

== Artwork ==
The album cover was generated using artificial intelligence (AI), for which the band received criticism. The band defended the use of AI, explaining:

The Songs for a Nervous Planet album artwork is a mixed media digital collage, with AI being just one of the many tools used in the creative process. We wanted vibrant artwork that evoked a sense of sci-fi, futuristic themes, and an escape from what is known. The sunflowers are a joyful nod to classic Tears For Fears imagery, while the juxtaposition of the astronaut is a link to our upcoming song, Astronaut, and a sense of alienation and not belonging. We have been fans of Surrealistly's work for a long time and knew he would be the perfect artist to bring our vision to life.

— Tears for Fears, Stereogum

== Formats ==
The album was released in a variety of formats including CD, digital, black vinyl, several coloured vinyl variations, and (in collaboration with SuperDeluxeEdition), a high-fidelity Blu-ray Audio disc. A deluxe edition of the album includes a bonus studio track ("Landlocked") in addition to the four new studio tracks on the regular edition of the album.

== Reception ==
Professional ratings
Aggregate scores
Source	Rating
Metacritic	76/100
Review scores
Source	Rating
AllMusic	3.5/5 stars
Clash	8/10
Classic Pop	4/5 stars
Classic Rock	7/10

In a review of Songs for a Nervous Planet, music critic Michael Gallucci states that "It's the history of Tears for Fears, up to now, in 22 songs." on Metacritic, the album has a aggregated review score of 76, which, according to Metacritic, means "Generally favorable" according to 4 critic reviews. In a review for Goldmine Magazine, music critic Lee Zimmerman called it a "consolidation of sorts." and that "For those fans and followers who may have been uncertain as to their current status, Songs for a Nervous Planet ought to assuage any doubt." In an AllMusic review, Timothy Monger writes that it "is essentially an EP of four new songs followed by 18 live tracks"

== Concert film ==
The album was released alongside a concert film titled Tears for Fears Live (A Tipping Point Film). The film was released in over 1100 cinemas worldwide on 24 and 26 October 2024.

== Track listing ==
Disc one
No.	Title	Writer(s)	Length
1.	"Say Goodbye to Mum and Dad" (studio track)	Roland Orzabal	3:45
2.	"The Girl That I Call Home" (studio track)	Roland Orzabal, John Shanks	3:44
3.	"Emily Said" (studio track)	Roland Orzabal	4:00
4.	"Astronaut" (studio track)	Roland Orzabal, Charlton Pettus	3:44
5.	"No Small Thing" (live in Franklin, Tennessee)	Roland Orzabal, Curt Smith	4:44
6.	"The Tipping Point" (live in Franklin, Tennessee)	Roland Orzabal, Charlton Pettus	4:14
7.	"Everybody Wants to Rule the World" (live in Franklin, Tennessee)	Roland Orzabal, Ian Stanley, Chris Hughes	4:24
8.	"Secret World" (live in Franklin, Tennessee)	Roland Orzabal	4:48
9.	"Sowing the Seeds of Love" (live in Franklin, Tennessee)	Roland Orzabal, Curt Smith	6:25
10.	"Long, Long, Long Time" (live in Franklin, Tennessee)	Roland Orzabal, Charlton Pettus, Curt Smith	4:17
11.	"Break the Man" (live in Franklin, Tennessee)	Charlton Pettus, Curt Smith	3:57

Disc two
No.	Title	Writer(s)	Length
1.	"My Demons" (live in Franklin, Tennessee)	Roland Orzabal, Florian Reutter, Sacha Skarbek	3:11
2.	"Rivers of Mercy" (live in Franklin, Tennessee)	Roland Orzabal, Charlton Pettus, Doug Petty	5:51
3.	"Mad World" (live in Franklin, Tennessee)	Roland Orzabal	3:34
4.	"Suffer the Children" (live in Franklin, Tennessee)	Roland Orzabal	3:26
5.	"Woman in Chains" (live in Franklin, Tennessee)	Roland Orzabal	6:27
6.	"Badman's Song" (live in Franklin, Tennessee)	Roland Orzabal, Nicky Holland	10:10
7.	"Pale Shelter" (live in Franklin, Tennessee)	Roland Orzabal, Curt Smith	4:37
8.	"Break It Down Again" (live in Franklin, Tennessee)	Roland Orzabal, Alan Griffiths	4:36
9.	"Head over Heels" (live in Franklin, Tennessee)	Roland Orzabal, Curt Smith	5:08
10.	"Change" (live in Franklin, Tennessee)	Roland Orzabal	4:32
11.	"Shout" (live in Franklin, Tennessee)	Roland Orzabal, Ian Stanley	6:32
Total length:			1:46:01

Bonus retail exclusive track (available on first disc)
No.	Title	Writer(s)	Length
5.	"Landlocked" (studio track)	Roland Orzabal, Curt Smith, Charlton Pettus	4:52
Total length:			1:51:06

== Personnel ==
=== Live tracks ===
- Roland Orzabal – vocals, guitar
- Curt Smith – vocals, bass guitar
- Doug Petty – keyboards
- Charlton Pettus – guitar, backing vocals
- Jamie Woolam – drums
- Lauren Evans – vocals on "Suffer The Children", co-lead vocals on "Woman in Chains" and "Badman's Song", backing vocals
- Janae Sims – backing vocals
- Jasmine Mullen – backing vocals

== Charts ==
Weekly chart performance for Songs for a Nervous Planet
Chart (2024)	Peak position
Austrian Albums (Ö3 Austria)	23
Belgian Albums (Ultratop Flanders)	145
Belgian Albums (Ultratop Wallonia)	14
Canadian Albums (Billboard)	20
Dutch Albums (Album Top 100)	58
French Albums (SNEP)	37
German Albums (Offizielle Top 100)	8
Italian Albums (FIMI)	72
Scottish Albums (Official Charts)	6
Spanish Albums (Promusicae)	66
Swiss Albums (Schweizer Hitparade)	12
UK Albums (Official Charts)	6
UK Album Downloads (Official Charts)	8
UK Albums Sales (OCC)	4
UK Physical Albums (OCC)	4
UK Record Store (OCC)	6
UK Vinyl Albums (OCC)	7
US Billboard 200	104
US Top Alternative Albums (Billboard)	12
US Independent Albums (Billboard)	17
US Top Rock Albums (Billboard)	14
US Top Rock & Alternative Albums (Billboard)	20
US Indie Store Album Sales (Billboard)	6
US Vinyl Albums (Billboard)	13
