= Tipping point =

Tipping point, TippingPoint or The Tipping Point may refer to:

== Science and technology ==
- Tipping point (physics), a threshold in a sharp hysteresis loop; once reached, the system rapidly changes its state
- Tipping point (sociology), an event when a previously rare phenomenon becomes rapidly and dramatically more common
- Tipping point, in catastrophe theory, the value of the parameter in which the set of equilibria abruptly changes
- Tipping points in the climate system, thresholds that, when exceeded, can lead to large changes in the state of the system

== As a proper name ==
=== Arts, entertainment, and media ===
==== Literature ====
- The Tipping Point, a 2000 book by Malcolm Gladwell

==== Music ====
- Tipping Point (band), an experimental contemporary jazz quartet from England, founded in 2013
- The Tipping Point (Authority Zero album), 2013
- The Tipping Point (The Roots album), 2004
- The Tipping Point (Tears for Fears album), 2022
  - The Tipping Point (song), 2021
- "Tipping Point" (song), by Megadeth, 2025

==== Television ====
- Tipping Point (game show), a British game show
- "Tipping Point" (CSI: Miami), an episode of CSI: Miami
- "Tipping Point" (Star Wars: The Bad Batch)
- "Tipping Points", a Star Wars: The Clone Wars episode
- "The Tipping Point" (The Outer Limits), a TV episode
- "The Tipping Point" (The Simpsons), an episode from The Simpsons season 35
- Tipping Point (The Morning Show), an episode of the American television series The Morning Show

== Other uses ==
- Tipping Point Community, a US philanthropic organization
- TippingPoint Technologies, a network security company
- Tipping-point state, in US presidential elections, the state that secures a candidate's victory, when all states are arranged in order of their vote margins

== See also ==
- Inflection point
- Tip (disambiguation)
- Tipping (disambiguation)
