= Rule the World: The Greatest Hits =

Greatest hits album by Tears for Fears
- Released: 10 November 2017
- Recorded: 1982–2017
- Genre: Pop rock
- Length: 74:14
- Labels: Virgin EMI; Mercury; UMe

Tears for Fears chronology
Ready Boy & Girls? (2014)	Rule the World: The Greatest Hits (2017)	The Tipping Point (2022)

Singles from Rule the World: The Greatest Hits
- 1. "I Love You but I'm Lost" Released: 13 October 2017

Professional ratings
Review scores
Source	Rating
Salon.com	positive

Rule the World: The Greatest Hits is a greatest hits album by the English pop rock band Tears for Fears, released in 2017 by Virgin EMI Records.

== Overview ==
The compilation is an updated version of 1992's Tears Roll Down (Greatest Hits 82–92), including almost every track from that album (with the sole exception of "Laid So Low (Tears Roll Down)"), plus additional singles from the three studio albums released after Tears Roll Down and two new songs: "Stay" and "I Love You but I'm Lost" (co-written by the band with Dan Smith of Bastille). The latter was released as a digital single on 13 October 2017.

The album peaked at No. 12 in the UK, becoming the band's sixth UK top 20 album, and has been certified Platinum by the British Phonographic Industry for combined units and sales in excess of 300,000 copies.

A UK and European tour called the Rule the World Live 2018 was scheduled to begin in April 2018, but was postponed to 2019 due to "unforeseen health concerns".

== Track listing ==
All tracks are written by Roland Orzabal, except where noted.

No.	Title	Writer(s)	Original album	Length
1.	"Everybody Wants to Rule the World"	Orzabal; Ian Stanley; Chris Hughes	Songs from the Big Chair, 1985	4:12
2.	"Shout" (7" edit)	Orzabal; Stanley	Songs from the Big Chair	4:45
3.	"I Love You but I'm Lost"	Orzabal; Curt Smith; Dan Smith; Mark Crew	Previously unreleased	4:21
4.	"Mad World"		The Hurting, 1983	3:33
5.	"Sowing the Seeds of Love"	Orzabal; C. Smith	The Seeds of Love, 1989	6:16
6.	"Advice for the Young at Heart"	Orzabal; Nicky Holland	The Seeds of Love	4:51
7.	"Head over Heels"	Orzabal; C. Smith	Songs from the Big Chair	4:14
8.	"Woman in Chains" (with Oleta Adams)		The Seeds of Love	6:30
9.	"Change" (radio edit)		The Hurting	3:56
10.	"Stay"	C. Smith; Charlton Pettus	Previously unreleased; later appeared on The Tipping Point, 2022	4:29
11.	"Pale Shelter (Note: Album version, incorrectly labeled as "2nd single version".)"		The Hurting	4:35
12.	"Mothers Talk" (U.S. remix)	Orzabal; Stanley	Songs from the Big Chair	4:12
13.	"Break It Down Again"	Orzabal; Alan Griffiths	Elemental, 1993	4:31
14.	"I Believe"		Songs from the Big Chair	4:54
15.	"Raoul and the Kings of Spain"	Orzabal; Griffiths	Raoul and the Kings of Spain, 1995	5:16
16.	"Closest Thing to Heaven"	Orzabal; C. Smith; Pettus	Everybody Loves a Happy Ending, 2004	3:35

== Charts ==
Chart performance for Rule the World: The Greatest Hits
Chart (2017–2022)	Peak position
Belgian Albums (Ultratop Flanders)	106
Belgian Albums (Ultratop Wallonia)	106
Greek Albums (IFPI)	7
Irish Albums (IRMA)	46
Scottish Albums (Official Charts)	12
Swiss Albums (Schweizer Hitparade)	87
UK Albums (Official Charts)	12

== Certifications ==
Certifications for Rule the World: The Greatest Hits
Region	Certification	Certified units/sales
France (SNEP)	Gold	50,000^{‡}
United Kingdom (BPI)	Platinum	300,000^{‡}
^{‡} Sales+streaming figures based on certification alone.
