= No Small Thing =

No Small Thing may refer to:

- No Small Thing (novel), a 2003 novel by Natale Ghent
- No Small Thing (song), a 2021 song by Tears for Fears
