= Tips =

Tips may refer to:

- Tips (Windows), a component of Microsoft Windows
- Ernest Oscar Tips, a Belgian aviation designer and entrepreneur
- "Tips", a song by Rodney Atkins from the album Take a Back Road

TIPS as an acronym may refer to:

- TARGET Instant Payment Settlement, an instant payment system of the euro area
- Operation TIPS, Terrorism Information and Prevention System
- Tether Physics and Survivability Experiment, a satellite to experiment with space tether
- Theory of Inventive Problem Solving, see TRIZ
- Thermally Induced Phase Separation, a common method used in scaffold design for tissue engineering
- Treatment Improvement Protocols (TIPs), a series of best-practice manuals for the treatment of substance use and other related disorders published by the US government
- Transjugular intrahepatic portosystemic shunt, an artificial channel within the liver
- Treasury Inflation-Protected Securities, a set of Bonds issued by the U.S. Treasury
- Trends in Pharmacological Sciences, a journal in the Trends series
- Trends in Plant Science, a journal in the Trends series
- Triisopropylsilyl, a type of silyl ether
- Triisopropylsilane, a hydrosilane
- Turkish Institute for Police Studies, University of North Texas

== See also ==
- Tip (disambiguation)
