= University of North Texas academic programs =

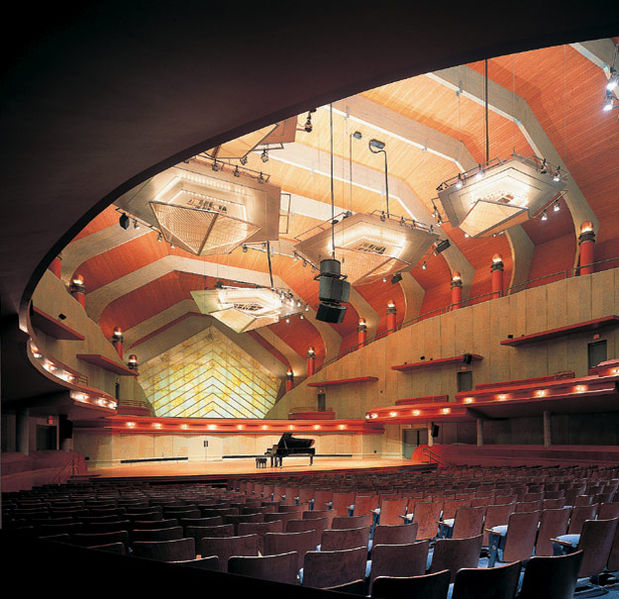
Winspear Hall, inside the Murchison Performing Arts Center

The University of North Texas (UNT) is a public research university in the Dallas–Fort Worth metroplex. UNT's main campus is in Denton, Texas, and it also has a satellite campus in Frisco, Texas. It offers 114 bachelor's, 97 master's, and 39 doctoral degree programs. UNT is the flagship member of the University of North Texas System, which includes additional universities in Dallas and Fort Worth.

UNT offers 112 bachelor's, 94 master's, and 38 doctorate degree programs as of 2024. These are organized into 14 colleges and schools. UNT has been accredited by the Southern Association of Colleges and Schools since 1924. As of 2020, the university was home to 37 research centers and institutes.

== Colleges and Schools ==
=== College of Liberal Arts and Social Sciences ===
The College of Liberal Arts and Social Sciences houses 22 academic departments and programs and five public services (including a psychology clinic and a speech and hearing clinic), and eight student services (of which seven are labs).

=== College of Science ===
UNT has been offering Bachelor of Science degrees for 108 years, Master of Science degrees (in biology, mathematics, chemistry, and economics) for 90 years, and Doctor of Philosophy degrees in several scientific disciplines—including chemistry, biology, and physics—for 61 years. UNT is a sponsoring institution member (Ph.D.-granting) of Oak Ridge Associated Universities (ORAU), a consortium of 105 major research universities that leverage scientific research through partnerships with national laboratories, government agencies, and private industry. It has been a member of the consortium since 1954.

=== G. Brint Ryan College of Business ===
The College of Business is host to five academic departments: (i) Accounting, (ii) Finance, Insurance, Real Estate and Law, (iii) Information Technology and Decision Sciences, (iv) Marketing, Logistics, and Operations Management (v) Management. It offers seven undergraduate programs, fourteen M.B.A. and master of science programs, and six Ph.D. programs. In Fall 2011, the college moved into a new state-of-the-art Gold LEED certified $70 million facility named the Business Leadership Building. The college is accredited in both business and accounting by the Association to Advance Collegiate Schools of Business—accreditation for the former stretches back sixty-four years (1961) and the latter, thirty-eight years (1987).

The college of business was renamed in 2019 to the G. Brint Ryan College of Business following a gift from alumnus G. Brint Ryan, alumnus and UNT System Board of Regents Chairman. The $30 million gift awarded by Ryan and his wife Amanda will create at least six endowed chairs and provide funding for academic program initiatives over seven years. Among the areas of focus are taxation and tax research, entrepreneurship, finance, logistics, information technology, cybersecurity and behavioral accounting.

In 2018, 5,093 students were enrolled as business majors at the undergraduate level.

In 2018, 691 students were working on graduate degrees. The college is host to two research centers (ii) the Institute of Petroleum Accounting and (iii) the Murphy Center for Entrepreneurship. U.S. News & World Report's "2021 Best Online Programs" ranked UNT 31st in the nation among the Best Online Graduate Business Programs.

=== College of Education ===
The College of Education is a legacy of the university's founding as a teachers college one hundred and thirty-five years ago. The college is organized as four departments and one center: (i) Counseling and Higher Education, (ii) Educational Psychology, (iii) Kinesiology, Health Promotion and Recreation, (iv) Teacher Education and Administration, and (v) The Kristin Farmer Autism Center. The college offers 12 bachelor's degrees, 19 master's degrees and 15 doctoral concentrations. As of the 2010–2011 school year, the college certified over 1,147 teachers, the second largest number in the state by a university. In 1979, the Texas Higher Education Coordinating Board approved renaming the "School of Education" to the "College of Education." At that time, the college was the largest in Texas and the Southwest, the largest doctoral program in the state, and the twenty-fifth largest producer of teacher certificates in the United States. Its prior name, "School of Education," dates back to 1946, when the teachers college outgrew itself and reorganized as six schools and colleges.

=== College of Engineering ===
The College of Engineering was founded in 2003, adapted from the previous UNT computer science and engineering technology programs, and is host to five distinct research centers; The Department of Mechanical Engineering, The Department of Biomedical Engineering, The Department of Computer Science and Engineering, The Department of Electrical Engineering and The Department of Materials Science and Engineering. The former of which (The Department of Mechanical Engineering) was formed in the merger of two previous departments: The Department of Mechanical and Energy Engineering and The Department of Engineering Technology.

=== College of Information ===
The College of Information was created in October 2008 by consolidating two existing academic units: Learning Technologies (formerly within the College of Education) and the School of Library and Information Sciences. The School of Library and Information Services was created in 1970 as an outgrowth of its former structure as the Department of Library Services. The college sponsors three research centers, one being The Texas Center for Digital Knowledge.

=== College of Merchandising, Hospitality and Tourism ===
The College of Merchandising, Hospitality and Tourism houses the largest merchandising program in the nation and one of the largest hospitality and tourism management programs. The college offers bachelor's degrees with majors in digital retailing, home furnishings merchandising, hospitality management, event design & experience management, and merchandising, and master's degrees in hospitality management, international sustainable tourism and merchandising. It has the nation's first bachelor's in digital retailing and master's in international sustainable tourism. The college was formerly known as the School of Merchandising and Hospitality Management.

=== College of Music ===
The College of Music is a comprehensive institution of international rank. Its heritage dates back one hundred and thirty-five years, when North Texas was founded. The college has the largest enrollment of any music institution accredited by the National Association of Schools of Music. It has been among the largest music institutions of higher learning in North America since the 1940s. The music library, founded in 1941, has one of the largest music collections in the United States, with over 300,000 volumes of books, periodicals, scores, and approximately 900,000 sound recordings. North Texas was first in the world to offer a degree in jazz studies. U.S. News & World Report ranked the jazz studies program as the best in the country every year from 1994, when it began ranking graduate jazz programs, to 1997, when it retired the category. The One O'Clock Lab Band has been nominated for 7 Grammy Awards.

=== College of Health and Public Service ===
Previously called the College of Public Affairs and Community Service (PACS) and before that the College of Community Service, the college adopted its current name in Fall 2017. The college is organized in seven departments: Audiology and Speech-Language Pathology; Behavior Analysis; Criminal Justice; Emergency Management and Disaster Science; Public Administration; Rehabilitation and Health Services; and Social Work.

The department of public administration is home of the nation's first comprehensive degree program in emergency and disaster management that launched in 1983. The degree incorporates interdisciplinary curricula from other colleges that include applied philosophy and environmental ethics. The degree is tailored for both management practitioners and researchers and is collaborative with the Federal Emergency Management Agency Region VI—based in Denton—which oversees Arkansas, Louisiana, New Mexico, Oklahoma, and Texas. Denton became home to FEMA when its predecessor, the Office of Civil Defense and Mobilization, constructed the nation's first Federal underground defense center in 1959.

The college is host to five research institutes, one being the Turkish Institute for Police Studies (TIPS). The institute has, since its founding in 1999, been based at North Texas. Its institution is a collaboration between the Turkish National Police (TNP) and U.S. universities in areas of terrorism, organized crime, narcotics, administration, intelligence, and investigation.

UNT and Texas Women's University began a joint Master of Social Work (M.S.W.) program in 2017.

=== College of Visual Arts and Design ===
The College of Visual Arts and Design has the 10th largest enrollment of any art and design school accredited by the National Association of Schools of Art and Design, and the second largest of any that awards doctorates. The college name changes reflect the curricular expansion of programs. In 1992, what then had been the "Department of Art" within the College of Arts and Sciences, became "School of Visual Arts;" and in 2007, it became the "College of Visual Arts and Design." Art classes began at UNT in 1894, four years after its founding. Master's degrees were initiated in the 1930s and the first Master of Science degree in art was awarded in 1937. Since 1972, the college has served as curator and custodian of the Texas Fashion Collection that was started by Stanley Marcus in 1938.

=== Honors College ===
The Honors College offers academic enrichments, including honors seminars and exclusive classes for high-achieving undergraduates. Its objective is to challenge exceptional students at higher levels and to promote leadership. The college is an autonomous collegiate unit on equal footing with the other collegiate units. Academically, it offers no degrees; but its courses are integrated with the baccalaureate programs of the other ten constituent colleges and the journalism school. Graduates are awarded a special medallion.

=== Mayborn School of Journalism ===
Curricular journalism at North Texas dates back to 1945. As a department, Journalism eventually became part of the College of Arts and Sciences. The Graduate Division of Journalism began in the fall of 1970 under the direction of Reginald Conway Westmorland. In 1999, twelve years after the death of Frank W. Mayborn, its graduate program was renamed the Frank W. Mayborn Graduate Institute of Journalism. On September 1, 2009, the entire program was elevated as its own collegiate unit and named the Frank W. and Sue Mayborn School of Journalism. Eight Pulitzer Prizes have been won by five of its alumni, among whom are Bill Moyers and Howard Swindle. Other notable alumni include Samir Husni and Cragg Hines. Since 1969, the news-editorial sequence has been accredited by the Accrediting Council on Education in Journalism and Mass Communications; and since 1986, the entire program has been accredited. The school is in its twenty-first year as founding host of the annual Mayborn Literary Nonfiction Conference.

Virginia Ellison (née Virginia Jones Paty; 1920–2009)—a North Texas alumna (BA, English, '41) who also taught English and journalism, sponsored the Student Press Club, and served as director of publicity at North Texas from 1942 to 1944—won a Pulitzer Traveling Fellowship in 1945, the year she earned a degree from the Columbia University Graduate School of Journalism.

=== Texas Academy of Mathematics and Science ===
TAMS is a two-year residential early college entrance program that has, since 1987, served exceptionally qualified Texas students who otherwise would be attending high school as juniors and seniors. It was the first of its kind in the nation and, as of 2012, the only in the state and one of five in the nation.

=== Toulouse Graduate School ===
The Toulouse Graduate School, founded seventy-nine years ago, is the academic custodian and administrator of all graduate programs offered by nine colleges and one school. It maintains records, administers admissions, and serves various roles in recruiting. It was renamed in 1990 in honor of Robert Bartell Toulouse, EdD (1918–2017), who joined in 1948 as a professor in the College of Education, then served dean of the Graduate School from 1954 to 1982. Toulouse, before retiring as professor emeritus, had served other roles at the university, including provost and vice president of academic affairs from 1982 to 1985.

== Libraries ==
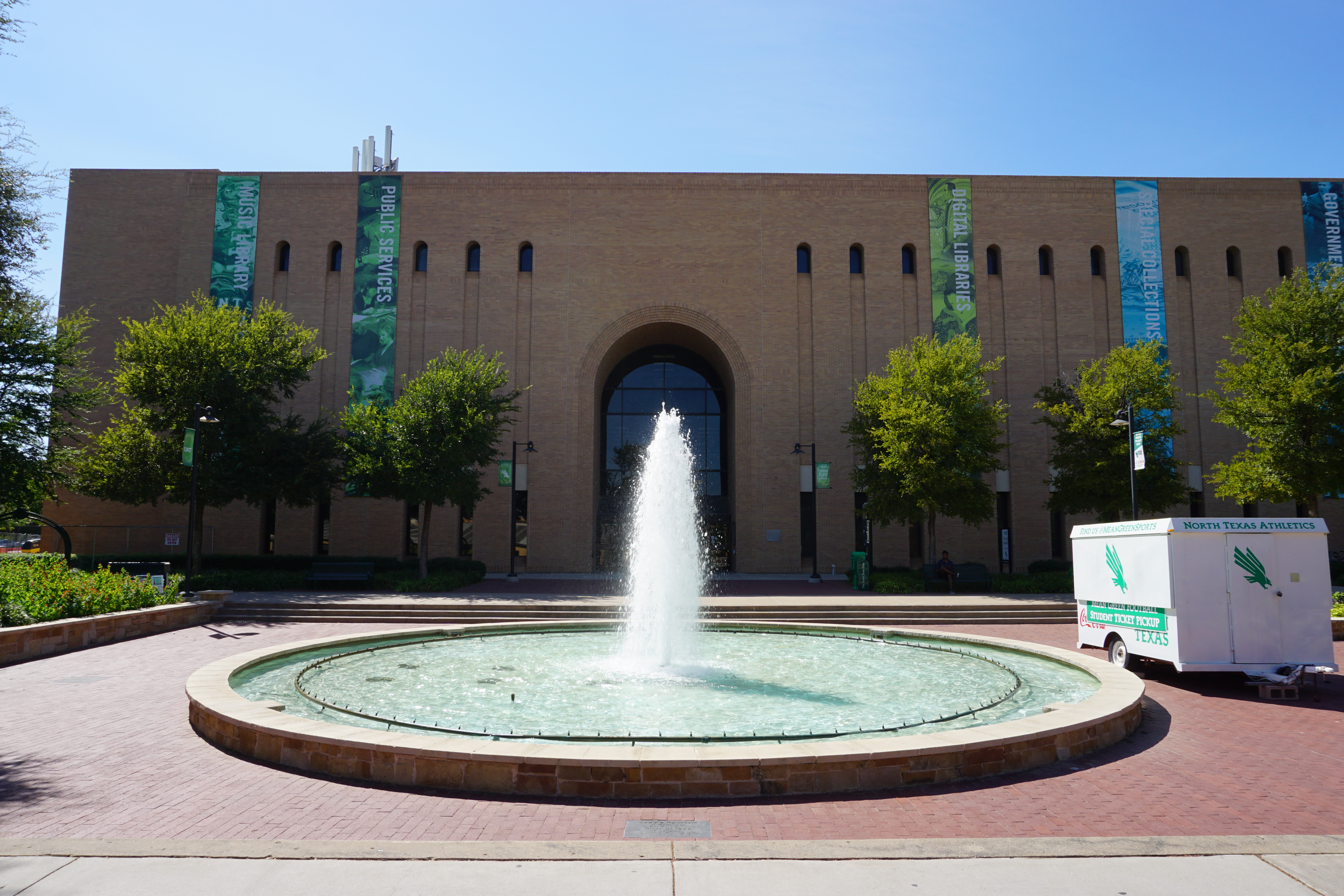
Willis Library, Onstead Plaza and Promenade, and Jody's Fountain

UNT Libraries are made up of four public service points and two remote storage facilities. Willis Library is the main library on campus, housing the business, economics, education, humanities and social sciences collections along with microforms and special areas such as the Music Library, Government Documents, the Digital Library Division, Archives, and the Rare Book and Texana collections. The Media Library in Chilton Hall houses a large collection of audiovisual materials, including films, audiobooks, and video games (see Game Design, above). Video recording equipment and gaming consoles are available for checkout. The Sycamore Library houses the government documents, law, political science, geography and business collections. It also houses the Collaboration and Learning Commons, a place to study in groups, create multi-media projects, and record presentations. The Discovery Park Library supports the College of Engineering and the College of Information, Library Science, and Technologies. It covers multiple areas of engineering, library and information science, and learning technology.

== The Intensive English Language Institute (IELI) ==
Established in 1977, IELI is the largest intensive English program (IEP) in North Texas, serving international students who wish to learn academic English in preparation for university studies in the United States. IELI is a constituent of UNT International Affairs, an interdisciplinary unit and exponent of globalization in higher education that provides leadership and support of international teaching, research, and study-abroad initiatives. As of July 2015, IELI has been located in Marquis Hall on the UNT Denton campus.
