= King of Spain (disambiguation) =

King of Spain may refer to:

== Kings ==
- Felipe VI, current King of Spain
- Past kings of Spain; see the full list of Spanish monarchs

== Music ==
- Future Kings of Spain, an Irish rock band
- "King of Spain", a song by the Canadian band Moxy Früvous
- "King of Spain", a song by the American indie rock band Galaxie 500
- "King of Spain", a song by Swedish indie folk artist The Tallest Man On Earth

== People ==
- A nickname for Ashley Giles, an English cricketer

== See also ==
- The monarchy of Spain, headed by the King or Queen of Spain
- Raoul and the Kings of Spain, an album by the English band Tears for Fears
