= Coalition for a Drug-Free Greater Cincinnati =

The Coalition for a Drug-Free Greater Cincinnati now called PreventionFIRST! (PF!) is anti-drug organization in Greater Cincinnati.

Rob Portman founded the Coalition for a Drug-Free Greater Cincinnati in 1996 before becoming a congressman. The organization advances "a comprehensive effort to address youth substance abuse".

PF! runs a number of programs, including the Ohio Rx Disposal initiative whereby Ohioans with limited or no access to prescription drug disposal sites can request a prescription drug disposal bag be mailed to them at no cost. This scheme was funded from 2016 to 2021 through the Strategic Prevention Framework for Prescription Drugs, managed by the Center for Substance Abuse Prevention, part of the Substance Abuse and Mental Health Services Administration. A further five years of fu nding was agreed in 2021.
