= Secrets (Tears for Fears song) =

Single by Tears for Fears

from the album Raoul and the Kings of Spain
- Released: January 1996 (US)
- Genre: Rock
- Length: 4:41
- Label: Epic
- Songwriters: Roland Orzabal; Alan Griffiths
- Producers: Roland Orzabal; Alan Griffiths; Tim Palmer

Tears for Fears singles chronology
"God's Mistake" (1995)	"Secrets" (1996)	"Falling Down" (1996)

"Secrets" is a song by the English pop rock band Tears for Fears, released in the US as a second single from their fifth album, Raoul and the Kings of Spain (1995). The song was also initially planned for release as a single in the UK, but was withdrawn.

== Critical reception ==
Steve Baltin from Cash Box wrote, "The latest release from the band's strong Raoul and the Kings of Spain CD is a lovely ballad that finds Roland Orzabal and musicians letting out a great deal of emotion. The result is a track that could fit in well at CHR, as well as Adult Contemporary. The band that once wanted to rule the world is growing up."

== Track listing ==
- USCD5/34K 78253-2
1. "Secrets" – 4:41
2. "Break It Down Again" (acoustic version) (Roland Orzabal, Alan Griffiths) – 3:42
- AUSTRALIACD5/663 061-1
1. "Secrets" – 4:41
2. "Break It Down Again" (acoustic version) (Orzabal, Griffiths) – 3:42
- EuropeCD5/662 731-1
1. "Secrets" – 4:42
2. "War of Attrition" (Orzabal, Griffiths) – 3:41
