= Tipping (disambiguation) =

Tipping is giving a gratuity to service sector workers.

Tipping may also refer to:

- Tipping (surname)
- Tipping baronets, a title in the Baronetage of England
- Norsk Tipping, the national lottery of Norway

== See also ==
- Cow tipping, a rumored activity involving pushing over a sleeping cow
- Fly-tipping, British term for illegally dumping waste
- Footy tipping, a competition involving picking winning sports teams over a given season
- Tipping fee, or gate fee, a charge levied based on quantity of waste
- Tipping point (disambiguation)
- Tip (disambiguation)
