= God's Mistake =

Single by Tears for Fears

from the album Raoul and the Kings of Spain
- B-side: "Until I Drown"; "War of Attrition"
- Released: October 1995 (US, Canada); 17 June 1996 (UK)
- Genre: Rock
- Length: 3:47
- Label: Epic
- Songwriters: Roland Orzabal; Alan Griffiths
- Producers: Roland Orzabal; Alan Griffiths; Tim Palmer

Tears for Fears singles chronology
| "Raoul and the Kings of Spain" (1995) | "God's Mistake" (1995) | "Secrets" (1996) |

"God's Mistake" is a song by the English pop rock band Tears for Fears, featured on their 1995 album Raoul and the Kings of Spain. The song was the first single taken from the album in the United States and Canada (where it was a minor hit), but the second to be taken from the album in the UK (following the release of the title track).

It reached #61 in the UK, #102 in the US, and #48 in Canada.

== Track listings ==
=== USCD5/34K 663418-2 ===
1. "God's Mistake" – 3:47
2. "Until I Drown" (Roland Orzabal, Alan Griffiths) – 3:23
3. "War of Attrition" (Orzabal, Griffiths) – 3:41

=== USCD5/34K 78064-2C ===
1. "God's Mistake" – 3:47
2. "Creep" (live in Birmingham) – 4:55

=== Austrian CD EPC 663117 2 ===
1. "God's Mistake" – 3:47
2. "Raoul and the Kings of Spain" (acoustic radio performance) (Orzabal, Griffiths) – 4:26
3. "Break It Down Again" (acoustic radio performance) (Orzabal, Griffiths) – 3:11

== Charts ==
| Chart (1995–1996) | Peak position |
|---|---|
| Canada Top Singles (RPM) | 48 |
| UK Singles (Official Charts) | 61 |
| US Bubbling Under Hot 100 (Billboard) | 2 |

== Release history ==
Release dates and formats for "God's Mistake"
| Region | Date | Format(s) | Label(s) | Ref. |
|---|---|---|---|---|
| United States | 24 April 1995 | Rock radio | Mercury | |
| United States | 26 June 1995 | Alternative radio; adult alternative radio | Mercury | |
| United Kingdom | 17 June 1996 | CD; cassette | Epic | |
