= Comprehensive Addiction and Recovery Act =

- Other short titles: Jason Simcakoski Memorial and Promise Act
- Long title: An Act to authorize the Attorney General and Secretary of Health and Human Services to award grants to address the prescription opioid and heroin use crises, and for other purposes.
- Acronyms (colloquial): CARA
- Nicknames: Comprehensive Addiction and Recovery Act of 2016
- Enacted by: the 114th United States Congress
- Effective: July 22, 2016

Citations
- Public law: 114-198
- Statutes at Large: 130 Stat. 695

Codification
- Titles amended: 42 U.S.C.: Public Health and Social Welfare; 21 U.S.C.: Food and Drugs
- U.S.C. sections amended: 42 U.S.C. §§ 10513, 10803, 1320a-7k, 1320a-7m, 1320d-2, 1395b-3, 1395ddd, 1395iii, 1395w-10, 1395w-101, 1395w-104, 1395w-152, 1395x, 1396, 1396a, 1396r, 1396w, 1397bb, 243, 280g-3, 290bb, 290bb-1, 290dd, 3711, 3793, 3797aa, 3797s, 5101, 5104, 5106a; 21 U.S.C. §§ 1521, 1903, 301, 321, 355, 355-1, 802, 812, 823, 829

Legislative history
- Introduced in the Senate as S. 524 by Sheldon Whitehouse (D–RI) on February 12, 2015; Committee consideration by Senate Judiciary; Passed the Senate on March 10, 2016 (94-1 Roll call vote 34, via Senate.gov); Passed the House on May 13, 2016 (400-5 Roll call vote 193, via Clerk.House.gov); Reported by the joint conference committee on July 6, 2016; agreed to by the House on July 8, 2016 (407-5 Roll call vote 399, via Clerk.House.gov) and by the Senate on July 13, 2016 (92-2 Roll call vote 129, via Senate.gov); Signed into law by President Barack Obama on July 22, 2016

The Comprehensive Addiction and Recovery Act (CARA) was signed into law by President Obama on July 22, 2016. The bill was introduced by Senator Sheldon Whitehouse and Representative Jim Sensenbrenner as the first major federal addiction act in 40 years.

CARA authorizes over $181 million to respond to the epidemic of opioid use disorder and is intended to greatly increase both prevention programs and the availability of treatment programs. While this bill authorized prevention and treatment programs, funding for its provisions had to come through Congress's appropriations process.

In May 2017, the Substance Abuse and Mental Health Services Administration (SAMHSA) announced grants totaling $2.6 million for recovery community organizations to build addiction recovery networks and engage in public education as authorized under CARA.
