= Tipp =

Tipp may refer to:

- Technometrica Institute of Policy and Politics, opinion polling division of Investor's Business Daily, United States
- "Tipp", a nickname of Thomas Agro (1931–1987), New York mobster
- Tipp FM, a radio station serving County Tipperary, Ireland
- County Tipperary, Ireland
  - Tipperary (town), a town in County Tipperary
- Tipp City, Ohio, United States

== See also ==
- Tom Tipps (1923–2013), American businessman and politician
- Tip (disambiguation)
- Transatlantic Trade and Investment Partnership (TTIP)
