= Falling Down (Tears for Fears song) =

Promotional single by Tears for Fears

from the album Raoul and the Kings of Spain
- Released: February 1996
- Genre: Rock
- Length: 4:55
- Label: Epic
- Songwriter(s): Roland Orzabal
- Producer(s): Roland Orzabal; Alan Griffiths; Tim Palmer

Tears for Fears singles chronology
"Secrets" (1996)	"Falling Down" (1996)	"Closest Thing to Heaven" (2005)

"Falling Down" is a song by English pop rock band Tears for Fears, released as a single from their fifth album, Raoul and the Kings of Spain (1995). It was released as a single in the US, Brazil, Mexico, and some European countries, but not the UK.

== Critical reception ==
Steve Baltin from Cash Box wrote, "The second single from the band's (Roland Orzabal and musicians) underrated new album, Raoul and the Kings of Spain is another impressively dark and haunting number. Backed by a medium-tempo beat, Orzabal sings in a sweet whisper throughout the song, raising the tone during the chorus. A sure bet at Triple A, let's hope radio programmers remember how good Tears for Fears have been to them in the past and take a chance on this excellent song."

== Track listing ==
1. "Falling Down" – 4:55
