= Türkiye İşçi Partisi =

Türkiye İşçi Partisi (Workers' Party of Turkey) may refer to two political parties:

- Türkiye İşçi Partisi (1961), 1961–1981, led by Mehmet Ali Aybar and Behice Boran
- Türkiye İşçi Partisi (2017), founded in 2017, led by Erkan Baş

== See also ==
- Workers' Party (Turkey), 1992–2015, led by Doğu Perinçek
