= Substance Abuse and Mental Health Services Administration =

Branch of the U.S. Department of Health and Human Services

United States Substance Abuse and Mental Health Services Administration

Agency overview
- Formed: July 1992; 34 years ago
- Jurisdiction: Federal government of the United States
- Headquarters: North Bethesda, Maryland (Rockville mailing address)
- Agency executive: Vacant, Assistant Secretary
- Parent department: Department of Health and Human Services
- Website: samhsa.gov

The Substance Abuse and Mental Health Services Administration (SAMHSA) is an agency within the United States Department of Health and Human Services (HHS). It supports mental health and substance use prevention, treatment, and recovery services through grants, technical assistance, and other programs. Its responsibilities include supporting community-based services, promoting the use of research findings in service delivery, and collecting and publishing behavioral health data. Its headquarters are at 5600 Fishers Lane in Rockville, Maryland.

== History ==
The front of the SAMHSA building outside of Rockville, MD

SAMHSA's predecessor, the Alcohol, Drug Abuse, and Mental Health Administration (ADAMHA), was established administratively in 1973 and authorized by legislation in 1974. It brought together the National Institute of Mental Health (NIMH), the National Institute on Alcohol Abuse and Alcoholism (NIAAA), and the National Institute on Drug Abuse (NIDA). The ADAMHA Reorganization Act of 1992 (Public Law 102–321), signed into law on July 10, 1992, established SAMHSA and reorganized federal responsibilities for mental health and substance use services and research. The research components of NIMH, NIAAA, and NIDA became part of the National Institutes of Health, while their service-related responsibilities were transferred to SAMHSA. The new agency assumed responsibilities for supporting community-based services, educating and training providers, and administering federal grants. Its original centers were the Center for Mental Health Services, the Center for Substance Abuse Prevention, and the Center for Substance Abuse Treatment. The Children's Health Act of 2000 reauthorized multiple SAMHSA programs, amended existing authorities, and established additional activities. Later legislation expanded particular areas of the agency's work. The Garrett Lee Smith Memorial Act of 2004 authorized youth suicide prevention programs, and the Comprehensive Addiction and Recovery Act of 2016 established or reauthorized activities concerning substance use treatment and recovery. The 21st Century Cures Act, enacted on December 13, 2016, reauthorized multiple SAMHSA programs and changed the agency's leadership structure. Section 6001 replaced the administrator position with the Assistant Secretary for Mental Health and Substance Use, appointed by the president with Senate confirmation. The assistant secretary reports to the Secretary of Health and Human Services. The SUPPORT for Patients and Communities Act of 2018 subsequently established or reauthorized additional SAMHSA activities related to substance use treatment. In 2022, the Consolidated Appropriations Act designated SAMHSA as the lead federal entity for behavioral health crisis services. On July 16 of that year, the National Suicide Prevention Lifeline transitioned to the three-digit 988 dialing code.

== Organization ==
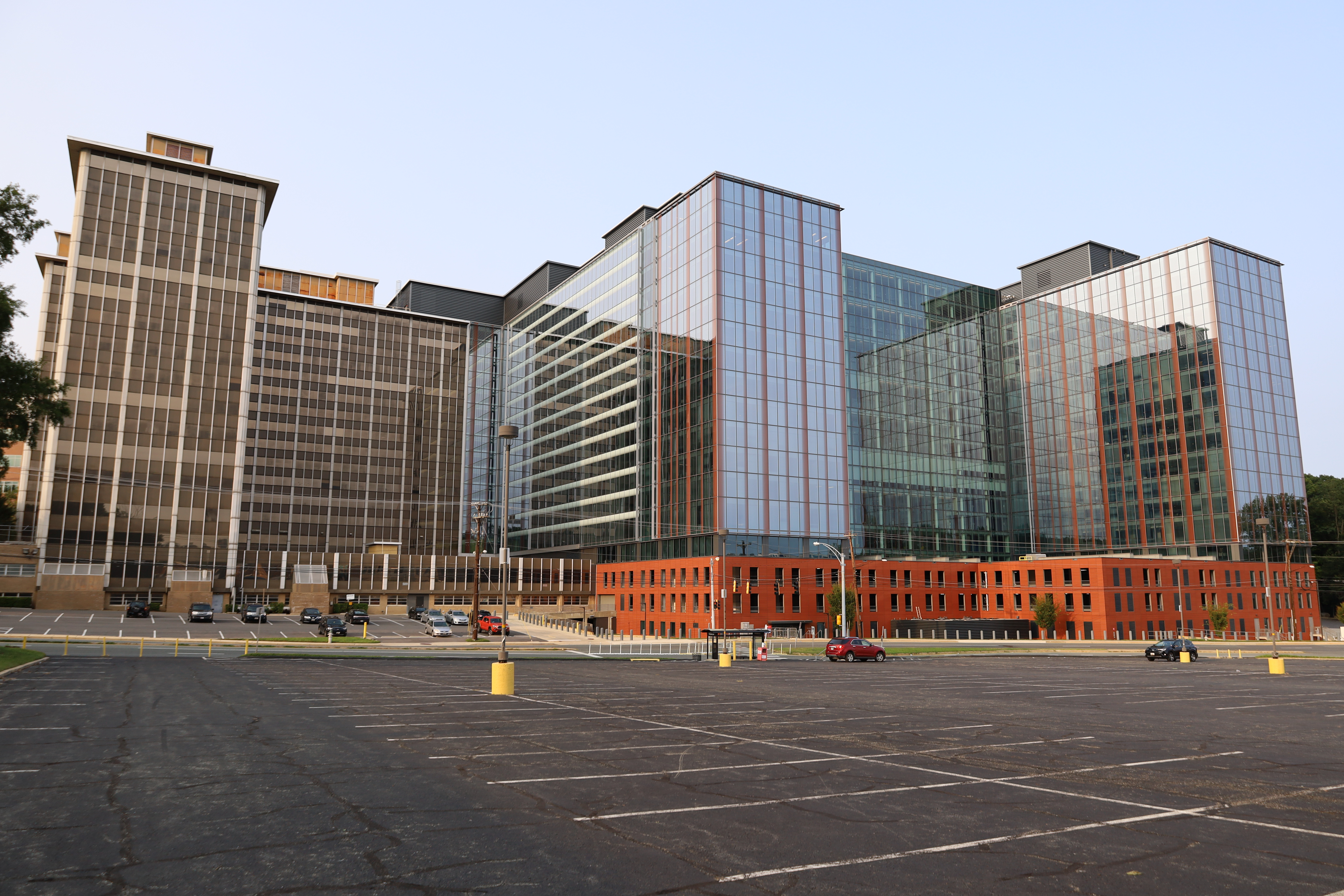
SAMHSA headquarters at 5600 Fishers Lane in Rockville, Maryland

SAMHSA supports states, territories, tribes, communities, and local organizations through grants and contracts. Its four centers have distinct responsibilities: * The Center for Mental Health Services (CMHS) supports mental illness prevention, treatment, and recovery services. * The Center for Substance Abuse Prevention (CSAP) supports substance use prevention programs and practices. * The Center for Substance Abuse Treatment (CSAT) supports community-based substance use treatment and recovery services. * The Center for Behavioral Health Statistics and Quality (CBHSQ) collects, analyzes, and publishes behavioral health data.

Several staff offices support the Centers:

- Office of Financial Resources
- Office of Management, Technology, and Operations
- Office of Communications
- Office of Recovery
- Office of Tribal Affairs and Policy

== Current leadership ==
As of February 2025, Christopher D. Carroll serves as principal deputy assistant secretary. His responsibilities include overall leadership of SAMHSA's policies, programs, operations, and budget.

=== Center for Mental Health Services ===
The Center for Mental Health Services (CMHS) is a component of the Substance Abuse and Mental Health Services Administration (SAMHSA), within the United States Department of Health and Human Services. It supports mental health promotion, prevention, treatment, and recovery through federal programs and assistance to states and communities. Its responsibilities include initiatives concerning serious mental illness, serious emotional disturbance in children and adolescents, early intervention, homelessness, suicide prevention, and crisis response. CMHS was established within SAMHSA under the Alcohol, Drug Abuse, and Mental Health Administration Reorganization Act of 1992 (Public Law 102–321). The legislation assigned the center responsibility for coordinating federal efforts concerning mental illness prevention and treatment and mental health promotion. CMHS supports service delivery through grants, training, and technical assistance. Its programs fund both mental health services and the development of state and community service systems. Supported activities extend into settings such as schools, primary care, child welfare, criminal and juvenile justice systems, and housing services.

As of April 2025, the director of CMHS is Dr. Tison Thomas.

=== Center for Substance Abuse Prevention ===
The Center for Substance Abuse Prevention (CSAP) is a component of SAMHSA that supports efforts to prevent the initiation and progression of substance use and reduce its associated consequences. Its activities include grant funding, technical assistance, public education, and support for the use of prevention research and data in community programs. CSAP was established as part of the 1992 reorganization that created SAMHSA. Its responsibilities include supporting substance use prevention programs and assisting states and communities in developing prevention systems. SAMHSA's Strategic Prevention Framework provides a planning approach for community prevention efforts. Its five steps are assessment, capacity building, planning, implementation, and evaluation. The framework emphasizes the use of local data and community participation to identify needs, select interventions, and assess results. CSAP provides guidance and technical assistance concerning compliance monitoring, inspection methods, and reporting.

As of January 2025, the director of CSAP is Rear Admiral Christopher Jones.

=== Center for Substance Abuse Treatment ===
The Center for Substance Abuse Treatment (CSAT) is a component of SAMHSA that supports community-based treatment and recovery services for people with substance use disorders and their families. Its responsibilities include expanding treatment capacity, supporting the adoption of evidence-based practices, and strengthening treatment organizations and service systems. CSAT was established as part of the 1992 reorganization that created SAMHSA. It administers grants and other activities supporting substance use treatment and recovery services.

As of October 2026, Karran A. Phillips serves as acting director of CSAT. She was appointed to that role in July 2025.

=== Center for Behavioral Health Statistics and Quality ===
The Center for Behavioral Health Statistics and Quality (CBHSQ) is SAMHSA's statistical center. It conducts national surveys, maintains behavioral health data systems, and provides statistical and analytical support to SAMHSA and HHS. Its work concerns mental health, substance use, treatment services, and related population trends. The 21st Century Cures Act of 2016 codified CBHSQ in federal law. Its activities include statistical methodology research, program evaluation, and participation in the development of national health statistics policy. CBHSQ publishes reports and makes data available for public use and analysis.

Rear Admiral Christopher Jones serves as acting director of CBHSQ.

== See also ==
- Alcohol, Drug Abuse, and Mental Health Services Block Grant
- Addiction recovery groups
- Self-help groups for mental health
- Treatment Improvement Protocols
- United States Department of Health and Human Services
