= No Small Thing (novel) =

2003 children's novel by Natale Ghent

- First edition
- Author: Natale Ghent
- Language: English
- Genre: Middle grade fiction
- Publisher: Candlewick Press
- Publication date: 2003
- Publication place: Canada
- ISBN: 9780763628611

No Small Thing is a 2003 Canadian coming-of-age middle grade fiction novel written by Natale Ghent, published by Candlewick Press and later by HarperTrophy. Set in 1970s rural Ontario, the book follows a teenage boy and his two sisters, who make the risky decision to buy a pony and keep it in a stranger's barn for themselves. No Small Thing was nominated for four Canadian book awards, and received positive reviews from critics and booksellers.

== Plot ==
Nathaniel, a twelve-year-old boy in 1970s Ontario, lives with his older sister Cid, his younger sister Queenie, and his single mother, who is the main breadwinner of the household. The children's father left them when they were younger, something that Nathaniel still secretly resents. He and Cid decide to take Queenie to adopt a free pony on the outskirts of town, and they hitchhike to the farm where the pony is being offered. Riding the pony back, Queenie falls and breaks her arm. A rude local curmudgeon agrees to let the children keep the pony at his own barn, on the grounds that the children make up for the cost by looking after his other horses. Nathaniel and Cid take Queenie home, and their mother, furious, fights with Nathaniel, causing him to flee the house and call his mother a "witch". The two later reconcile, an event that causes Nathaniel to reflect on his own maturity. The children name the pony Smokey (after its gray coat colouring), and spend much of their time after school at the local barn.

Nathaniel recalls seeing the release of Star Wars at the movie theatre, and also the rejection he faces from an older girl, Cheryl, whom he has a crush on. Cheryl is upper-class, and sees no viability of a long-term relationship with a working-class boy. When in the house one day, Nathaniel accidentally knocks over and crushes all of Cid's beloved ceramic animal figurine collection, causing her to cry, and feeling terrible, he seeks out a new animal figurine within his budget to give his sister for Christmas. He buys a tiny fawn in a basket, but the basket is squished. Cid adores it anyway, and the two siblings make up. Nathaniel realizes that the extra cost of the ceramic fawn would not be such an expense to him if his father had remained with the family, and angrily breaks down outside one day, believing that he's seen a man who looks just like his father living with another family, with a new wife and children.

The barn catches fire one day, and Smoky is saved, but the children no longer have anywhere else to keep the beloved pony. Nathaniel realizes that they may have to give Smoky up for the pony's own welfare, and he reflects on his own class status as a low-income Canadian, as well as his own impending teenage years.

== Reception ==
No Small Thing was praised by critics, called "a gift from a gifted writer" by The Globe and Mail, while Books in Canada reviewer Pat Barclay wrote that the book "brings the whole family a measure of the security for which they yearn and a better understanding of each other." Gwyneth Evans, in a Quill & Quire review, credited Ghent for creating a "lovable young hero" in an "absorbing story." No Small Thing was nominated for the CLA Book of the Year for Children award and the Silver Birch award (Honour Book), a Junior Library Guild selection in the United States and a Borders Original Voice notoriety. The book won the Hackmatack Children's Choice Book Award in 2006, and was added to the University of Central Florida "Diverse Families" collection as a result, owing to the book's exploration of working-class life in Canada.
