= Treatment Improvement Protocols =

Treatment Improvement Protocols (TIPs) are a series of best-practice manuals for the treatment of substance use and other related disorders. The TIP series is published by the Substance Abuse and Mental Health Services Administration (SAMHSA), an operational division of the U.S. Department of Health and Human Services.

SAMHSA convenes panels of clinical, research, and administrative experts to produce the content of TIPs, which are distributed to public and private substance abuse treatment facilities and individuals throughout the United States and its territories. TIPs deal with all aspects of substance abuse treatment, from intake procedures to screening and assessment to various treatment methodologies and referral to other avenues of care. TIPs also deal with administrative and programmatic issues such as funding, inter-agency collaboration, training, accreditation, and workforce development. Some TIPs also cover ancillary topics that tend to be associated with substance abuse treatment, such as co-occurring mental health problems, criminal justice issues, housing, and primary care. Once the content of a TIP has been finalized and approved by SAMHSA, the publications are printed through the U.S. Government Printing Office.

As of May 2024, 64 TIPs have been published (although the most recently published is numbered #65; see below). Most are available through the SAMHSA 'Store.' SAMHSA also makes newer TIPs available for download in Portable Document Format (PDF), or accessible online through the National Library of Medicine. Although TIPs frequently show up on internet auction sites and through used book sellers for varying costs, they are intended to be available for free to the public. SAMHSA does not charge for them.

== The TIP Series ==
- TIP 1: State Methadone Treatment Guidelines (replaced by TIP 43)
- TIP 2: Pregnant, Substance-Using Women (replaced by TIP 51)
- TIP 3: Screening and Assessment of Alcohol- and Other Drug-Abusing Adolescents (replaced by TIP 31)
- TIP 4: Guidelines for the Treatment of Alcohol- and Other Drug-Abusing Adolescents (replaced by TIP 32)
- TIP 5: Improving Treatment for Drug-Exposed Infants
- TIP 6: Screening for Infectious Diseases Among Substance Abusers
- TIP 7: Screening and Assessment for Alcohol and Other Drug Abuse Among Adults in the Criminal Justice System (replaced by TIP 44)
- TIP 8: Intensive Outpatient Treatment for Alcohol and Other Drug Abuse (replaced by TIPs 46 and 47)
- TIP 9: Assessment and Treatment of Patients with Coexisting Mental Illness and Alcohol and Other Drug Abuse
- TIP 10: Assessment and Treatment Planning for Cocaine-Abusing Methadone-Maintained Patients
- TIP 11: Simple Screening Instruments for Outreach for Alcohol and Other Drug Abuse and Infectious Diseases
- TIP 12: Combining Substance Abuse Treatment with Intermediate Sanctions for Adults in the Criminal Justice System (replaced by TIP 44)
- TIP 13: Role and Current Status of Patient Placement Criteria in the Treatment of Substance Use Disorders
- TIP 14: Developing State Outcomes Monitoring Systems for Alcohol and Other Drug Abuse Treatment
- TIP 15: Treatment for HIV-Infected Alcohol and Other Drug Abusers (replaced by TIP 37)
- TIP 16: Alcohol and Other Drug Screening of Hospitalized Trauma Patients
- TIP 17: Planning for Alcohol and Other Drug Abuse Treatment for Adults in the Criminal Justice System (replaced by TIP 44)
- TIP 18: The Tuberculosis Epidemic: Legal and Ethical Issues for Alcohol and Other Drug Treatment Providers
- TIP 19: Detoxification From Alcohol and Other Drugs (replaced by TIP 45)
- TIP 20: Matching Treatment to Patient Needs in Opioid Substitution Therapy (replaced by TIP 43)
- TIP 21: Combining Alcohol and Other Drug Abuse Treatment With Diversion for Juveniles in the Justice System
- TIP 22: LAAM in the Treatment of Opiate Addiction (replaced by TIP 43)
- TIP 23: Treatment Drug Courts: Integrating Substance Abuse Treatment With Legal Case Processing
- TIP 24: A Guide to Substance Abuse Services for Primary Care Clinicians
- TIP 25: Substance Abuse Treatment and Domestic Violence
- TIP 26: Substance Abuse Among Older Adults (updated 2020)
- TIP 27: Comprehensive Case Management for Substance Abuse Treatment
- TIP 28: Naltrexone and Alcoholism Treatment
- TIP 29: Substance Use Disorder Treatment For People With Physical and Cognitive Disabilities
- TIP 30: Continuity of Offender Treatment for Substance Use Disorders from Institution to Community
- TIP 31: Screening and Assessing Adolescents for Substance Use Disorders
- TIP 32: Treatment of Adolescents with Substance Use Disorders
- TIP 33: Treatment for Stimulant Use Disorders
- TIP 34: Brief Interventions and Brief Therapies for Substance Abuse
- TIP 35: Enhancing Motivation for Change in Substance Abuse Treatment (updated 2019)
- TIP 36: Substance Abuse Treatment for Persons with Child Abuse and Neglect Issues
- TIP 37: Substance Abuse Treatment for Persons with HIV/AIDS
- TIP 38: Integrating Substance Abuse Treatment and Vocational Services
- TIP 39: Substance Abuse Treatment and Family Therapy (updated 2020)
- TIP 40: Clinical Guidelines for the Use of Buprenorphine in the Treatment of Opioid Addiction
- TIP 41: Substance Abuse Treatment: Group Therapy
- TIP 42: Substance Abuse Treatment for Persons With Co-Occurring Disorders (updated 2020)
- TIP 43: Medication-Assisted Treatment for Opioid Addiction in Opioid Treatment Programs
- TIP 44: Substance Abuse Treatment for Adults in the Criminal Justice System
- TIP 45: Detoxification and Substance Abuse Treatment
- TIP 46: Substance Abuse: Administrative Issues in Outpatient Treatment
- TIP 47: Substance Abuse: Clinical Issues in Intensive Outpatient Treatment
- TIP 48: Managing Depressive Symptoms in Substance Abuse Clients During Early Recovery
- TIP 49: Incorporating Alcohol Pharmacotherapies Into Medical Practice
- TIP 50: Addressing Suicidal Thoughts and Behaviors in Substance Abuse Treatment
- TIP 51: Substance Abuse Treatment: Addressing the Specific Needs of Women
- TIP 52: Clinical Supervision and Professional Development of the Substance Abuse Counselor
- TIP 53: Addressing Viral Hepatitis in People With Substance Use Disorders
- TIP 54: Managing Chronic Pain in Adults With or in Recovery From Substance Use Disorders
- TIP 55: Behavioral Health Services for People Who Are Homeless
- TIP 56: Addressing the Specific Behavioral Health Needs of Men
- TIP 57: Trauma-Informed Care in Behavioral Health Services
- TIP 58: Addressing Fetal Alcohol Spectrum Disorders (FASD)
- TIP 59: Improving Cultural Competence
- TIP 60: Using Technology-Based Therapeutic Tools in Behavioral Health Services
- TIP 61: Behavioral Health Services for American Indians and Alaska Natives
- TIP 63: Medications for Opioid Use Disorders (updated 2021)
- TIP 64: Incorporating Peer Support into Substance Use Disorder Treatment Services
- TIP 65: Counseling Approaches to Promote Recovery From Problematic Substance Use and Related Issues

== See also ==
- Substance dependence
- Substance abuse
