= Raoul and the Kings of Spain (song) =

1995 single by Tears for Fears

Single by Tears for Fears

from the album Raoul and the Kings of Spain
- B-side: "Queen of Compromise"; "All of the Angels"; "Creep" (live); "The Madness of Roland"
- Written: August–December 1993
- Released: 25 September 1995
- Genre: Rock
- Length: 5:15
- Label: Epic
- Songwriters: Roland Orzabal; Alan Griffiths
- Producers: Roland Orzabal; Tim Palmer; Alan Griffiths

Tears for Fears singles chronology
"Elemental" (1994)	"Raoul and the Kings of Spain" (1995)	"God's Mistake" (1995)

"Raoul and the Kings of Spain" is a song by the English pop rock band Tears for Fears, released as the first single from their 1995 album of the same name. Upon its release, the single reached number 31 in the United Kingdom and would be the band's last top-40 hit there for 10 years, until 2005's "Closest Thing to Heaven". The song also reached number 39 in the Wallonia region of Belgium.

== Background ==
The track was written two years prior to its release during the band's 1993 Elemental tour. In a TV interview in 1995, Roland Orzabal explained that "Raoul is a name that has been in my family for many generations, [...] I was actually born Raoul, and my mother [...] decided that after two weeks she would change it to Roland to make it easier for English people to pronounce. So it became my nickname, and then when I had my first son [...] we decided to hand it on to him."

Orzabal further explained that "the Kings of Spain" is a reference to his family history and lineage from his father's side (his father was of Spanish-Basque descent, and his grandfather was Argentinian). Orzabal stated that, in particular, his father told him "that my great great grandmother was the cousin of the president of Argentina, so really the album should have been called Raoul and the Presidents of Argentina, but not a lot of things rhyme with Argentina."

During a playlist meeting hosted by Metro Radio Group, one of the music organizers reported that attendees "were quite impressed with the single". They also expressed their belief that the song "marks a return to the band's rather aggressive old style".

== Music video ==
The video for the song was filmed at the Mission Inn Hotel & Spa in Riverside, California. The Inn is a listed historic landmark, and was where Bette Davis married in 1945. The video features Orzabal with his full supporting band including guitarist Alan Griffiths (who co-wrote and co-produced the song) and bass player Gail Ann Dorsey.

== Track listings ==
UK CD1

1. "Raoul and the Kings of Spain" – 5:15
2. "Queen of Compromise" (Roland Orzabal, Alan Griffiths, Brian Macleod, Jebin Bruni, Gail Ann Dorsey, Jeffrey Trott) – 3:52
3. "All of the Angels" (Orzabal, Griffiths) – 4:25

UK CD2

1. "Raoul and the Kings of Spain" – 5:15
2. "Creep" (live in Birmingham) – 4:55 (Radiohead cover)
3. "The Madness of Roland" (Orzabal, Griffiths) – 5:09

== Charts ==
Chart (1995)	Peak position
Belgium (Ultratop 50 Wallonia)	39
Europe (European Hit Radio)	19
Italy Airplay (Music & Media)	2
Scottish Singles Sales (Official Charts)	32
UK Singles (Official Charts)	31
