= Tip (nickname) =

List of people with the same nickname

Tip is the nickname of:

- R. E. Foster (1878-1914), English cricketer and footballer
- Tip Logan (1927-2007), Canadian football player
- Tip Marugg (1923-2006), Dutch-Curaçaoan writer and poet
- Aaron S. Merrill (1890-1961), American vice admiral
- Tip O'Neill (1912-1994), American politician
- Tip O'Neill (baseball) (1858-1915), Canadian Major League Baseball player
- Tip Snooke (1881-1966), South African cricketer
- Tip Tipping (1958-1993), English film and television stuntman and actor
- Tip Williams (1900-1974), Welsh cricketer

== See also ==
- Tipper Gore (born 1948), American author, photographer, and social issues advocate, wife of former Vice President Al Gore
