= I Love You but I'm Lost =

Single by Tears for Fears

from the album Rule the World: The Greatest Hits
- Released: 13 October 2017
- Recorded: 2017
- Genre: Alternative rock
- Length: 4:21
- Label: Virgin EMI
- Songwriters: Roland Orzabal; Curt Smith; Dan Smith; Mark Crew
- Producer: Mark Crew

Tears for Fears singles chronology
"Secret World" (2006)	"I Love You but I'm Lost" (2017)	"The Tipping Point" (2021)

Music video
- "I Love You but I'm Lost" on YouTube

"I Love You but I'm Lost" is a song by the English pop rock band Tears for Fears, released as a single in October 2017. It was the band's first new original release in eleven years, and was one of two new tracks included on the band's greatest hits collection, Rule the World: The Greatest Hits, which was released on 10 November 2017. A video for the song, filmed at Dirty Laundry bar in Los Angeles, was released online in December 2017.

The song was written by Tears for Fears members Roland Orzabal and Curt Smith, with Bastille's Dan Smith and producer Mark Crew. Dan Smith’s vocals are used in the song but he wasn’t given official credit. Orzabal said “I don't think he realizes it but we kept it. We may have to pay him.”

Speaking about the track in a press release, Orzabal said: "This song is about the haziness, the blurred lines within a relationship, the sense of having someone and losing someone in the same instant; like putting your arms around that person only for them to instantly disappear into vapours, the idea or ideal of someone who is impossible to pin down or own."
