= The Tipping Point (Tears for Fears album) =

Studio album by Tears for Fears
- Released: 25 February 2022
- Recorded: 2013–2021
- Genres: Pop rock; electropop; art pop
- Length: 42:25
- Label: Concord
- Producers: Tears for Fears; Charlton Pettus; Florian Reutter; Sacha Skarbek

Tears for Fears chronology
Rule the World: The Greatest Hits (2017)	The Tipping Point (2022)	Songs for a Nervous Planet (2024)

Singles from The Tipping Point
- 1. "The Tipping Point" Released: 7 October 2021; 2. "No Small Thing" Released: 3 December 2021; 3. "Break the Man" Released: 13 January 2022; 4. "My Demons" Released: 1 June 2022; 5. "Long, Long, Long Time" Released: 18 August 2022; 6. "Rivers of Mercy" Released: 23 June 2023

The Tipping Point is the seventh studio album by the English pop rock band Tears for Fears, released on 25 February 2022 through Concord Records. It is the band's first studio album since Everybody Loves a Happy Ending, released almost 18 years prior. Work on the album commenced in 2013, but the project endured numerous delays and setbacks between touring; disagreements that bandleaders Roland Orzabal and Curt Smith had with their record label and management; and the death of Orzabal's wife, which influenced many of the songs on the album. The bulk of the album was completed in 2020 and 2021.

It reached the Top 10 in numerous other countries including the US, Australia, France, Germany, Ireland, Switzerland, Belgium and The Netherlands. It became the band's third US top-ten album on the chart and their first release to achieve this since their 1989 album The Seeds of Love. The tracks "The Tipping Point", "No Small Thing", "Break the Man", "My Demons", "Long, Long, Long Time", and "Rivers of Mercy" were released as singles to promote the album.

== Background ==
Work on the album began in 2013, but the process proved difficult for band members Roland Orzabal and Curt Smith. The band were asked by their (then) management company to collaborate with various younger artists in an attempt to create a more contemporary- and commercial-sounding album. However, these sessions (which the band themselves likened to "speed dating") were not entirely successful, resulting in an album which, as Orzabal later put it, sounded "less like a Tears For Fears album". The band originally signed to the Warner Music label to release the album, but once it was completed in 2016, Universal Music (who own the bulk of the band's back catalogue from the 1980s and 90s) then showed interest in the project. Universal opted to first release a new compilation album, Rule the World: The Greatest Hits, in 2017 in order to pave the way for the new album. This included two of the new tracks, including "I Love You but I'm Lost" which was co-written by the band along with members of Bastille. Earlier that year (on April 7), Orzabal uploaded a demo version of "Please Be Happy", sung by him (as opposed to Smith on the final release, which is also sped up so it is now a half-step higher), on SoundCloud. It was only later revealed that the lyrics were about his wife's struggles with depression, alcoholism and ensuing medical problems.

However, Universal then delayed releasing The Tipping Point as planned, at which point Orzabal and Smith began to have second thoughts about the finished product. The duo lost focus on the project for a while as Orzabal struggled with health problems following the death of his wife, and Smith even contemplated walking away from the band altogether. However, after a successful tour in 2019, they reconvened in early 2020 and "plotted a path forward of how we could finish an album that we were both happy with". The duo signed with a new management company, decided to rework the album (keeping some tracks and replacing others with new material), and then signed a new contract with Concord Records. Many lyrics were inspired by the death of Orzabal's wife in 2017. Of the various songs recorded with other artists and producers, many of the band's collaborations with Sacha Skarbek remained on the album. The track "Stay", which was the other new track to appear on the Rule the World compilation album in 2017, was also included in a slightly remixed form.

== Promotion ==
"The Tipping Point" was released as the album's lead single on 7 October 2021. The music video for the track was directed by Matt Mahurin.

The second single was "No Small Thing", released 3 December 2021, and accompanied by a collage music video directed by Vern Moen. The song was described as a restarting point after the band had been unhappy with the first version of the album, which was dominated by tracks that had been created with younger producers.

The third single, "Break the Man", was released on 13 January 2022. The song is about patriarchy and marks the first time Tears for Fears have released an original song as a single not written or co-written by Roland Orzabal. Smith had tweeted a snippet of the song in 2018, though the chorus lyric had originally been "kill the man" instead of "break the man". An animated video (directed by WeAreMonkeys, with animation by Mihai Wilson) was premiered on 10 February 2022.

A music video for "My Demons" was released on 1 June 2022, directed by Heather Gildroy and featuring the dancer Ed Monroe. Earlier, Orzabal had joked that the song sounded as if it was written for Depeche Mode.

On 18 August 2022 the band released a fifth single and video - this time for the song "Long, Long, Long Time". In an interview with RetroPop Magazine Curt Smith explained that the song is basically about how he and Roland learned to solve disagreements through honest and open dialogue. Once again Heather Gildroy directed the video, though this time with Justin Daashuur Hopkins.

A sixth single from the album, "Rivers of Mercy", was announced in June 2023. Inspired by the ordeal of the 2020 lockdowns, Orzabal declared the track as "probably my favourite song on the whole album."

== Release ==
The album release featured multiple deluxe editions with three bonus tracks in different variations. The only release containing all three bonus tracks on one disc is the Super Deluxe Edition (SDE) CD edition, which was limited to 2000 units.

"Let It All Evolve" and "Shame (Cry Heaven)" are also available on vinyl, as a 7" that is part of the limited Target vinyl edition.

Steven Wilson mixed the album (without bonus tracks) to 5.1 surround and Dolby Atmos. The Atmos version was also released on streaming services, but the 5.1 is only available on the SDE blu-ray disc, again initially limited to 2000 units, but later re-pressed due to demand, the second pressing surpassing the first with 2500 manufactured units.

== Critical reception ==
Professional ratings
Aggregate scores
Source	Rating
AnyDecentMusic?	7.9/10
Metacritic	83/100
Review scores
Source	Rating
AllMusic	4/5 stars
Clash	8/10
Classic Rock	4.5/5 stars
The Guardian	3/5 stars
The Independent	5/5 stars
musicOMH	3.5/5 stars
The Observer	3/5 stars
Pitchfork	7.5/10
PopMatters	8/10
Record Collector	5/5 stars
Uncut	8/10

The Tipping Point received an average score of 83 out of 100 based on 15 reviews according to Metacritic, indicating "universal acclaim". Some reviewers hailed it as one of the finest albums in Tears for Fears career.

In Record Collector Charles Waring wrote that The Tipping Point is "quite possibly the duo's most impressive musical offering in a mostly glorious 40-year career. It features all the familiar elements we long associate with classic Tears For Fears – big, sing-along choruses and deeply thoughtful lyrics married to dramatic arrangements – but without the bombastic production values that defined their synth-heavy 80s records", praising it "an album blazing with a refulgent light that illuminates the darkness. Ultimately, it's a cathartic celebration of life co-created by someone who's survived a traumatic experience. More importantly, it shows how heartbreak, suffering and tragedy can be refashioned into transcendent art."

"Across the next nine tracks they deliver pounding pop thrills and arena-sized catharsis, in a style that refines their distinctive sound instead of pimping it up", Helen Brown of The Independent wrote, also giving the album a full five star rating.

Reviewing the album for Pitchfork, Stephen Thomas Erlewine said that The Tipping Point is an "album that feels like the most fully realized record Tears for Fears have ever made, a culmination of the musical and emotional themes they've held dear since their inception."

Classic Rock Magazine deemed it "tip-top art-pop." Less positive, The Observer's Phil Mongredien found that "while it all sounds impeccably polished, it lacks the sort of killer hook that used to consistently elevate them above their mid-80s peers. The end result finds elegance trumping excitement."

== Track listing ==
The Tipping Point track listing
No.	Title	Writer(s)	Producer(s)	Length
1.	"No Small Thing"	Orzabal; Smith	Tears for Fears; Charlton Pettus	4:42
2.	"The Tipping Point"	Orzabal; Pettus	Tears for Fears; Sacha Skarbek; Florian Reutter^{[a]}	4:13
3.	"Long, Long, Long Time"	Smith; Orzabal; Pettus	Tears for Fears; Pettus	4:31
4.	"Break the Man"	Smith; Pettus	Tears for Fears; Pettus	3:55
5.	"My Demons"	Orzabal; Skarbek; Reutter	Tears for Fears; Skarbek; Reutter^{[a]}	3:08
6.	"Rivers of Mercy"	Orzabal; Pettus; Doug Petty	Tears for Fears; Pettus	6:08
7.	"Please Be Happy"	Orzabal; Skarbek	Tears for Fears; Pettus	3:05
8.	"Master Plan"	Orzabal	Tears for Fears; Pettus	4:37
9.	"End of Night"	Orzabal	Tears for Fears; Skarbek; Reutter^{[a]}	3:23
10.	"Stay"	Smith; Pettus	Tears for Fears; Skarbek; Pettus^{[a]}; Reutter^{[a]}	4:36
Total length:				42:25

Bonus track on Deluxe CD edition
No.	Title	Writer(s)	Producer(s)	Length
11.	"Secret Location" (UK and European deluxe edition bonus track)	Smith; Skarbek; Orzabal; Jacknife Lee	Tears for Fears; Skarbek; Florian Reutter^{[a]}	4:04
Total length:				46:29

Additional bonus tracks on UK Deluxe CD edition
No.	Title	Writer(s)	Producer(s)	Length
12.	"Let It All Evolve"	Smith; Orzabal; Pettus	Tears for Fears; Pettus; Skarbek; Reutter^{[a]}	4:26
13.	"Shame (Cry Heaven)"	Smith; Skarbek; Pettus; Reutter; Orzabal	Tears for Fears; Skarbek; Florian Reutter^{[a]}	5:31
Total length:				56:26

Bonus tracks on US Target & Japanese editions
No.	Title	Writer(s)	Producer(s)	Length
11.	"Let It All Evolve"	Smith; Orzabal; Pettus	Tears for Fears; Pettus; Skarbek; Reutter^{[a]}	4:26
12.	"Shame (Cry Heaven)"	Smith; Skarbek; Pettus; Reutter; Orzabal	Tears for Fears; Skarbek; Florian Reutter^{[a]}	5:31
Total length:				52:20

Note

- ^{^[a]} indicates an additional producer

== Personnel ==
Tears for Fears

- Roland Orzabal – vocals (lead on 1, 2, 5, 6, 8, 9, 11 & 12), keyboards, programming, guitars, mixing (5, 9)
- Curt Smith – vocals (lead on 2, 3, 4, 7, 10 & 13; backing on 1, 5 & 11), keyboards, bass guitars, mixing (5, 9)

Additional musicians

- Charlton Pettus – keyboards, programming, guitars, mixing (1, 3, 4, 6–8, 10, 11)
- Sacha Skarbek – acoustic piano (7), vocal production (3)
- Florian Reutter – programming, vocal production (3)
- Doug Petty – accordion, Hammond organ (1), acoustic piano (6), string arrangements (7)
- Max von Ameln – guitars (5)
- Aaron Sterling – drums (1, 4, 6)
- Jamie Wollam – drums (1)
- Carina Round – backing vocals (1, 3, 5, 6)
- Jason Joseph – vocal arrangements, choir (6)
- Charles Jones – choir (6)
- Jessi Collins – choir (6)
- Lauren Evans – choir (6)

Technical

- Ted Jensen – mastering (1–10)
- Justin Shturtz – mastering (11–13)
- Tim Palmer – mixing (2)
- Craig Silvey – mixing (12)
- Tony Maserati – mixing (13)
- Max von Ameln – engineering assistance
- Steven Wilson – surround mixing (Blu-ray and Atmos streaming)

Artwork

- Tommy Steele – design, art direction
- Carrie Smith – art direction
- Cinta Vidal – cover art
- Frank Ockenfels 3 – photography

== Charts ==
=== Weekly charts ===
Weekly chart performance for The Tipping Point
Chart (2022)	Peak position
Australian Albums (ARIA)	7
Austrian Albums (Ö3 Austria)	16
Belgian Albums (Ultratop Flanders)	8
Belgian Albums (Ultratop Wallonia)	2
Canadian Albums (Billboard)	20
Danish Albums (Hitlisten)	36
Dutch Albums (Album Top 100)	5
French Albums (SNEP)	10
German Albums (Offizielle Top 100)	3
Hungarian Albums (MAHASZ)	30
Irish Albums (Official Charts)	10
Italian Albums (FIMI)	14
Japanese Albums (Oricon)	51
Japanese Hot Albums (Billboard Japan)	80
Polish Albums (ZPAV)	30
Portuguese Albums (AFP)	27
Scottish Albums (Official Charts)	1
Spanish Albums (Promusicae)	23
Swiss Albums (Schweizer Hitparade)	4
UK Albums (Official Charts)	2
US Billboard 200	8
US Top Alternative Albums (Billboard)	1
US Top Rock Albums (Billboard)	1
US Top Album Sales (Billboard)	1

=== Year-end charts ===
2022 year-end chart performance for The Tipping Point
Chart (2022)	Position
Belgian Albums (Ultratop Wallonia)	195
