= Texas Instruments Power =

Texas Instruments Power, known more popularly by its acronym TIP, is a series of bipolar junction transistors manufactured by Texas Instruments. The series was introduced in the 1960s, and still sees some use today due to their simplicity, their durability, and their ease of use. A Texas Instruments catalog in 1966 lists the TIP04 and TIP14 part numbers.

== Specific models ==
=== TIP29 and TIP30 ===
The TIP29 and TIP30 are complementary transistors, used in medium power linear switching applications. The TIP29 is NPN, while the TIP30 is PNP. One of their uses was in general purpose amplifiers.

=== TIP31 and TIP32 ===
A TIP31 an NPN bipolar transistor and TIP32 is the complementary PNP transistor. TIP31 transistors are designated as TIP31A, TIP31B, TIP31 to indicate increasing collector-base and collector-emitter breakdown voltage ratings. The TIP31 is packaged in a TO-220 case. TIP stands for Texas Instruments (Plastic) Power transistor. 31 is an arbitrary identifier.

These ratings are for the Fairchild TIP31 series. Other manufacturers may have other ratings for this part. These are absolute maximum ratings and should not be exceeded.

Model	V_{cb}	V_{ce}	I_{ce}	Power (T_{c} = 25 °C)
TIP31	40	40	3A	40W
TIP31A	60	60	3A	40W
TIP31B	80	80	3A	40W
TIP31C	100	100	3A	40W

These characteristics apply to all types of TIP31 transistors (A, B, C). The characteristics are very similar between models, however differences may apply depending on temperature and/or manufacturing process.

Parameter	Manufacturer		
	Fairchild	Samsung Semi.	Micro Electronics
V_{ce} saturation	1.2V	1.2V	1.2V
V_{be} saturation	1.8V	1.8V	1.8V
Small signal DC current gain (H_{fe})	25	25	20
H_{fe} bandwidth product	3.0 MHz	3.0 MHz	3.0 MHz

=== TIP33 and TIP34 ===
Complementary silicon transistors for use in high power general purpose amplifier and switching applications. The TIP33 is NPN and the TIP34 is PNP. Both are rated for 10 A continuous collector current.

=== TIP35 and TIP36 ===
The two transistors are complementary silicon transistors, the TIP35 being NPN configured, while the TIP36 is PNP. Both are rated for 25 A continuous collector current.
