= Tip of the iceberg =

Tip of the iceberg may refer to:

- Tip of the iceberg, the top tenth portion of an iceberg, which floats above the water's surface
- The idiom, "Tip of the iceberg", meaning the portion of something that is immediately apparent, which obscures the complexity (i.e. the underwater portion of the iceberg) of the subject being discussed.
- "The Tip of the Iceberg", alternative name for Al Jazeera show "The Hidden is More Immense".

== Music ==
- Tip of the Iceberg (album), an album by Tom Principato
- Tip of the Iceberg (EP), an EP by New Found Glory
- Tip of the Iceberg, an album by MC Juice
- Tip of the Iceberg, a 1993 album by Greater Than One
- "The Tip of the Iceberg", a song from the 2009 Owl City album Ocean Eyes
