= Break the Man =

Single by Tears for Fears

from the album The Tipping Point
- Released: 13 January 2022
- Genre: Pop
- Length: 3:55
- Label: Concord
- Songwriters: Curt Smith; Charlton Pettus
- Producers: Tears for Fears; Charlton Pettus

Tears for Fears singles chronology
"No Small Thing" (2021)	"Break the Man" (2022)	"My Demons" (2022)

Music video
- "Break the Man" on YouTube

"Break the Man" is a song by the English pop rock band Tears for Fears from their 2022 album The Tipping Point. It was released as the third single from the album on 13 January 2022.

== Background ==
In 2020, Curt Smith and Roland Orzabal began writing new songs for a new album, which included "No Small Thing", "The Tipping Point" and "Long, Long, Long Time". "Break the Man" is not written or co-written by Orzabal, with writing credits being given to Smith and Charlton Pettus.

== Composition and lyrics ==
According to Smith, "Break the Man" is a song about patriarchy and strong women. According to Smith:

It's really a song about a strong female, but it's more about trying to break the patriarchy, I felt like a lot of the problems we were having here as a country even worldwide to a certain degree came obviously from male dominance, and its a song about a female who is strong enough to break the man.

— Curt Smith on the meaning of the song's lyrics.

== Reception ==
Rock Cellar Magazine described It as having a "particularly specific thematic element".

== Music video ==
The music video for the song was directed by WeWereMonkeys, an animation studio, and animated by Mihai Wilson with production work by Marcella Moser.
