= Turkish Institute for Police Studies =

The Turkish Institute for Police Studies (TIPS) has been functionally housed at the University of North Texas for over five years. The aim of TIPS is to combine the practical experience of the Turkish National Police in policing areas (especially terrorism, organized crime, narcotics, administration, intelligence, and investigation) with the academic and theoretical foundation represented by masters and doctoral education in the United States universities. Its ultimate goal is to explore new practical and functional approaches to the global crime problem by using its members’ extensive experience throughout their academic journey as professionals.

Activities:

- Istanbul Democracy and Global Security Konference

== See also ==
- Education in Turkey
- Law Enforcement in Turkey
