= Raoul and the Kings of Spain =

Studio album by Tears for Fears
- Released: 16 October 1995
- Recorded: Summer 1993 – 1995
- Studios: Neptune's Kitchen (England); Record Plant (Los Angeles)
- Genres: Pop rock; alternative rock; progressive pop
- Length: 50:16
- Label: Epic
- Producers: Tim Palmer; Roland Orzabal; Alan Griffiths

Tears for Fears chronology
Elemental (1993)	Raoul and the Kings of Spain (1995)	Saturnine Martial & Lunatic (1996)

Singles from Raoul and the Kings of Spain
- 1. "Raoul and the Kings of Spain" Released: 25 September 1995 (UK); 2. "God's Mistake" Released: October 1995 (US, Canada); 3. "Secrets" Released: January 1996 (US)

Professional ratings
Review scores
Source	Rating
AllMusic	2/5 stars
Entertainment Weekly	B
Select	3/5 medals

Raoul and the Kings of Spain is the fifth studio album by the English pop rock band Tears for Fears, released on 16 October 1995 by Epic Records. It is the second and final album made without the involvement of Curt Smith following Elemental (1993), with Roland Orzabal once again employing outside musicians.

Orzabal's primary musical collaborator for Raoul and the Kings of Spain was Alan Griffiths, who acted in the same role for Elemental, co-writing most of the album with Orzabal. Raoul and the Kings of Spain also retained producer Tim Palmer from Elemental. Raoul was a commercial disappointment for the band, becoming their lowest charting album in both the UK and US up to that point and receiving mixed reviews.

== Background ==
Raoul and the Kings of Spain was recorded between Summer 1993 and 1995 by Roland Orzabal, Alan Griffiths, and the band they toured with during the Elemental tour of August–December 1993 (Gail Ann Dorsey, Brian MacLeod, Jeffrey Trott, and Jebin Bruni). Recording sessions for the album took place in Neptune's Kitchen (Orzabal's home studio in Dyrham, England, where Elemental was recorded) and in the Record Plant in Los Angeles.

The album, according to Orzabal, has a recurring theme of familiar relationships and delves into his own Spanish heritage. The album's title was mooted as far back as the 1980s as a possible contender for the band's third album (which ultimately became The Seeds of Love). Raoul was originally Orzabal's first name given at birth before being anglicized by his parents to Roland (Orzabal later gave the name Raoul to his first son, born in 1991).

The album features a reunion with Oleta Adams, who had recorded and toured extensively with the band for The Seeds of Love album and here duets with Orzabal on the track "Me and My Big Ideas".

The front cover photo, titled Running Them In at Pamplona, is by Jose Galle and is a depiction of the annual "Running of the Bulls" festival held in Pamplona in Spain. Several inner sleeve photographs were by David Tack, taken from his book Impressions of Spain published by Quartet (the Bullfighter on Horseback on page 4 is Rafael Peralta, a renowned Spanish Rejoneador bullfighter). Inner sleeve photos of Orzabal were taken by Pamela Springsteen, shot at the historic Mission Inn in Riverside, California, where the promo video for "Raoul and the Kings of Spain" was filmed.

== Release and reception ==
The album was originally scheduled to be released by Mercury Records but the release was postponed after Tears for Fears left the label to sign with Sony/Epic Records. The promitional copies of the album by Mercury were circulating with a different cover art and track listing: the future B-side "Queen of Compromise" was featured instead of tracks "Humdrum and Humble" and "I Choose You".

The album was eventually released by Sony in October 1995 and peaked at number 41 in the United Kingdom and number 79 in the United States, but was more successful in continental Europe, reaching number 13 in Belgium (Wallonia) and number five in France.

Raoul and the Kings of Spain was re-released in August 2009 by Cherry Pop Records, complete with seven bonus tracks: "All of the Angels", "Queen of Compromise", and "The Madness of Roland" originally appeared as B-sides in the UK 2-disc single release of "Raoul and the Kings of Spain"; "Raoul and the Kings of Spain (acoustic)" was originally released as a UK promo single and as a B-side in the single release of "God's Mistake; "Until I Drown" and "War of Attrition" originally appeared as B-sides in the UK and US single release of "Secrets"; "Break It Down Again (acoustic)" originally appeared as a B-side in the European single release of "God's Mistake" and the US single release of "Secrets".

In 2020 the album was reissued digitally with slightly reordered bonus tracks from 2009 edition and the addition of the cover version of Radiohead's "Creep" recorded live in Birmingham during the Elemental tour on 14 December 1993. This track was originally a B-side of UK single of "Raoul and the Kings of Spain" and the US single of "God's Mistake".

== Track listing ==
No.	Title	Writer(s)	Length
1.	"Raoul and the Kings of Spain"	Roland Orzabal; Alan Griffiths	5:16
2.	"Falling Down"	Orzabal	4:56
3.	"Secrets"	Orzabal; Griffiths	4:42
4.	"God's Mistake"	Orzabal; Griffiths	3:47
5.	"Sketches of Pain"	Orzabal	4:21
6.	"Los Reyes Católicos"	Orzabal; Griffiths	1:44
7.	"Sorry"	Orzabal; Griffiths	4:48
8.	"Humdrum and Humble"	Orzabal; Griffiths	4:11
9.	"I Choose You"	Orzabal	3:26
10.	"Don't Drink the Water"	Orzabal; Griffiths	4:51
11.	"Me and My Big Ideas"	Orzabal; Griffiths	4:33
12.	"Los Reyes Católicos (Reprise)"	Orzabal; Griffiths	3:43

Bonus tracks on the 2009 Cherry Red Records reissue
No.	Title	Writer(s)	Length
13.	"All of the Angels"	Orzabal; Griffiths	4:31
14.	"The Madness of Roland"	Orzabal; Griffiths	5:10
15.	"Queen of Compromise"	Orzabal; Griffiths; MacLeod; Bruni; Dorsey	3:57
16.	"Until I Drown"	Orzabal; Griffiths	3:23
17.	"War of Attrition"	Orzabal; Griffiths	3:45
18.	"Raoul and the Kings of Spain" (acoustic)	Orzabal; Griffiths	4:29
19.	"Break It Down Again" (acoustic)	Orzabal; Griffiths	3:14

Additional bonus track on the 2020 reissue
No.	Title	Writer(s)	Length
20.	"Creep" (live)	Radiohead	4:53

== Personnel ==
=== Tears for Fears ===
- Roland Orzabal – lead vocals, keyboards, guitars

=== Additional musicians ===
- Alan Griffiths – keyboards, guitars
- Jebin Bruni – Hammond organ
- Jeffrey Trott – guitars
- Gail Ann Dorsey – bass
- Brian MacLeod – drums, percussion
- Oleta Adams – guest vocalist on "Me and My Big Ideas"
- Mark O'Donoughue – backing vocals

=== Technical ===
- Producers – Tim Palmer (tracks 1–7, 10–12); Roland Orzabal and Alan Griffiths (tracks 8, 9).
- Engineer – Mark O'Donoughue
- Mastered by Bob Ludwig at Gateway Mastering (Portland, Maine).
- Album Coordinators – Jason Geake and Philippa Sprigg
- Design – Gail Marowitz
- Front Cover Photo – Jose Galle
- Inner Sleeve Photos – David Tack and Pamela Springsteen

== Charts ==
Chart performance for Raoul and the Kings of Spain
Chart (1995)	Peak position
Belgian Albums (Ultratop Wallonia)	13
Canada Top Albums/CDs (RPM)	62
Dutch Albums (Album Top 100)	70
European Albums (Music & Media)	16
French Albums (IFOP)	5
German Albums (Offizielle Top 100)	88
Swiss Albums (Schweizer Hitparade)	42
UK Albums (Official Charts)	41
US Billboard 200	79
