= No Small Thing (song) =

Single by Tears for Fears

from the album The Tipping Point
- Released: 3 December 2021
- Genre: Folk; country; pop
- Length: 4:42
- Label: Concord
- Songwriters: Roland Orzabal; Curt Smith
- Producers: Tears for Fears; Charlton Pettus

Tears for Fears singles chronology
"The Tipping Point" (2021)	"No Small Thing" (2021)	"Break the Man" (2022)

Music video
- "No Small Thing" on YouTube

"No Small Thing" is a song by the English pop band Tears for Fears from their 2022 album The Tipping Point. It was released as a single ahead of the album on 3 December 2021.

== Background ==
According to Roland Orzabal in an interview with Rolling Stone, Curt Smith and Orzabal began writing the track in early 2020, when Smith and Orzabal got together with two acoustic guitars, at which Orzabal claimed that they were having "a meeting of minds", Smith wrote an acoustic guitar riff that sounded like Johnny Cash or Bob Dylan, according to Orzabal. According to Orzabal they were doing the "complete opposite of what we had been trying to do for many years – searching for the elusive, modern hit single."

== Composition and lyrics ==
The lyrics of "No Small Thing" talk about looking at the misconceptions and inconsistencies of freedom. American Songwriter describes it as being a "constant chug, and thug, at resetting the collective mindset". Smith believed it "could have been a song from a seventies or sixties acoustic folk album with how the track starts. The fact that we felt confident enough to go from there to the end of the song to where it’s just absolute mayhem speaks to that sense of freedom, and that’s our comfort zone musically."

== Music video ==
A collage music video directed by Vern Moen was uploaded on 2 December 2021.

== Personnel ==
According to the Tipping Point liner notes, except where noted:

- Roland Orzabal – lead vocal, guitars
- Curt Smith – harmony vocal, bass
- Doug Petty – organ
- Aaron Sterling – drums
- Jamie Wollam – drums
- Carina Round – backing vocals
