= The Tipping Point (song) =

2021 single by Tears for Fears

Single by Tears for Fears

from the album The Tipping Point
- Released: 7 October 2021
- Genre: Synth-pop
- Length: 4:13
- Label: Concord
- Songwriters: Roland Orzabal; Charlton Pettus
- Producers: Florian Reutter; Sacha Skarbek; Tears for Fears

Tears for Fears singles chronology
"I Love You but I'm Lost" (2017)	"The Tipping Point" (2021)	"No Small Thing" (2021)

Music video
- "The Tipping Point" on YouTube

"The Tipping Point" is a song by the English pop rock band Tears for Fears, released as a single in October 2021. It was the band's first new original release in four years, and is the first single to be taken from the album of the same name which was released on 25 February 2022. A video for the song, directed by Matt Mahurin, was released online on 6 October 2021, and is the first promo video featuring the band themselves since 2005. The song was added to BBC Radio 2's playlist in November 2021.

== Composition ==
The song was written by Tears for Fears founder member Roland Orzabal with long-term collaborator Charlton Pettus, and was inspired by Orzabal's struggles with grief and the loss of his wife. In an interview with Rolling Stone, Orzabal stated that "The song itself was built out of a 'haunting backing track idea' created by the band's co-producer and longtime touring member Charlton Pettus. "He blended a couple of trademark themes, twisted the time signature and left me to sort out the rest."

Regarding the lyrics, Orzabal commented "It came at a time when my (late) wife was very ill. I was watching her become a ghost of her former self. So the song's narrator is in a hospital ward looking at people about to cross the threshold that we call death....The line in the song says, 'Will you ever know when it's the Tipping Point?' meaning, will you ever know when a person has crossed that threshold from life to death when you cannot even perceive that 'vague and distant void' as it's described in the lyric. I have to admit that even in March 2016 when I was read the riot act by doctors about Caroline possibly not making it through the weekend, I was still in denial. I think that when you've been close to someone for decades, they are living within you as well as without. And consciously I did not believe she would die, though subconsciously I was, without doubt, preparing for the inevitable, arming myself against the future shock."

== Charts ==
Chart (2021)	Peak position
UK Singles Downloads Chart	36
UK Singles Sales Chart	37
US Adult Alternative Airplay (Billboard)	17
US Alternative Digital Song Sales	17
US Rock Digital Song Sales	19
