= 1985 in music =

This is a list of notable events in music that took place in the year 1985.

== Specific locations ==
- 1985 in British music
- 1985 in Japanese music
- 1985 in Norwegian music
- 1985 in Scandinavian music

== Specific genres ==
- 1985 in country music
- 1985 in heavy metal music
- 1985 in hip-hop music
- 1985 in jazz
- 1985 in progressive rock

== Events ==
=== January–March ===
- January 1 – The newest music video channel, VH-1, begins broadcasting on American cable. It is aimed at an older demographic than its sister station, MTV. The first video played is Marvin Gaye's rendition of "The Star-Spangled Banner".
- January 11
  - One of the biggest music festivals in the world begins in Rio de Janeiro, Brazil. Rock in Rio had an audience of 1.5 million people, and featured Iron Maiden, Nina Hagen, The B52's, Go Go's, Queen, Rod Stewart, James Taylor and AC/DC, along with Brazilian artists such as Gilberto Gil, Elba Ramalho, Barão Vermelho and Paralamas do Sucesso.
  - Willie Dixon sues Led Zeppelin over the song "Whole Lotta Love", on the grounds that it contains too many similarities to his own song "You Need Love". The lawsuit is settled out of court.
- January 28 – Various artists, under the group name USA For Africa, including Ray Charles, Bob Dylan, Michael Jackson, Billy Joel, Cyndi Lauper, Steve Perry, Kenny Loggins, Willie Nelson, Lionel Richie, Smokey Robinson, Kenny Rogers, Diana Ross, Paul Simon, Bruce Springsteen, Huey Lewis, Tina Turner, Sheila E., Harry Belafonte, Lindsey Buckingham, Kim Carnes, Dionne Warwick, Waylon Jennings, Bob Geldof and Stevie Wonder, record the song "We Are the World", written by Jackson and Ritchie.
- February – Just months after the compact disc release of his sixteenth and most recent studio album, Tonight, and nearly two years after the initial CD release of its predecessor, Let's Dance, RCA Records reissues David Bowie's previous fourteen studio albums plus four greatest hits albums on the format. Consequently, Bowie becomes the first major artist to have his entire catalog converted to CD.
- February 14
  - Whitney Houston releases her debut album.
- February 22
  - The "One Night with Blue Note" concert, celebrating the relaunch of Blue Note Records and featuring over 30 jazz greats, is held at The Town Hall in New York. Freddie Hubbard, Herbie Hancock, Jack DeJohnette, McCoy Tyner and Grover Washington, Jr. are just a few of the performers.
- February 26 – The 27th Annual Grammy Awards are presented in Los Angeles, hosted by John Denver. Lionel Richie's Can't Slow Down wins Album of the Year, while Tina Turner's "What's Love Got to Do with It" wins both Record of the Year and Song of the Year. Cyndi Lauper wins Best New Artist.
- March 9 – Tears for Fears album Songs from the Big Chair debuts at number two on the UK Albums Chart. Enjoying massive sales, it spends 29 consecutive weeks on the top 10 and remain on the chart for another 50 weeks until September 1986.
- March 27 – The South African Broadcasting Corporation bans Stevie Wonder's music in response to Wonder dedicating the Oscar he had won the night before to Nelson Mandela.
- March 28 – A wax likeness of Michael Jackson is unveiled at Madame Tussaud's in London, UK.

=== April–June ===
- April 1 – After months of squabbling, David Lee Roth leaves Van Halen to begin a solo career.
- April 7 – Wham! becomes the first Western pop group to perform in China when they play a concert in Beijing's Workers Stadium during an historic 10-day visit.
- April 10 – Madonna begins her very first tour, The Virgin Tour (named after her Like a Virgin album) in Seattle, Washington, USA.
- April 20 – Tears for Fears single "Everybody Wants to Rule the World" becomes their highest-charting single in the UK as it reach number two on the singles chart, held off the top position for two consecutive weeks by "We are the World".
- May – Russian singer Valery Leontiev starts his 10-date tour "Alone with all" and it becomes an instant hit. Queues for tickets blocked the traffic on a few central streets of Leningrad.
- May 4 – With "La det swinge" by Bobbysocks!, Norway scores its first win at the Eurovision Song Contest, in Gothenburg, Sweden.
- May 13 – Dire Straits release their fifth studio album, Brothers in Arms. The album becomes highly successful in part because of its unusually high sound quality, the result of it being recorded entirely digitally as opposed to with standard analog magnetic tape. The album additionally serves as a killer app for the compact disc format, becoming the first album to sell more copies on CD than on phonograph record, and goes on to become the highest selling album of the 1980s in the UK.
- June 11 – Madonna ends The Virgin Tour at Madison Square Garden in New York, USA.

=== July–September ===
- July 13 – The Live Aid concert takes place in Wembley Stadium, London, UK, and JFK Stadium in Philadelphia, USA. The headlining acts at the latter venue included a Led Zeppelin reunion, the first since their 1980 disbandment. The former venue, however, becomes the more notable of the two over the years, in part due to the high acclaim of Queen's performance of "Radio Ga Ga", which serves as the band's comeback in the United Kingdom (Queen would still remain a pariah in the United States in the wake of Hot Space until after Freddie Mercury's death six years later). With a little help from the British Concorde jet, singer Phil Collins manages to perform at both venues. This would be the last time Duran Duran would perform together with the original line up until they reunited to record their 2004 album Astronaut. On this day they would also have the number 1 song on the US Billboard charts with their James Bond theme to the film A View to a Kill.
- September 6 – Michael Jackson purchases the publishing rights for most of the Beatles' music for $47 million, much to the dismay of Paul McCartney, against whom he is bidding.
- September 19 – The Parents Music Resource Center's (P.M.R.C.) United States Senate hearing on rock censorship begin in Washington, D.C. Heavy metal singer Dee Snider of Twisted Sister, rock star Frank Zappa and country singer John Denver testify against the P.M.R.C.
- September 21 – The 14th OTI Festival, held at the Teatro Lope de Vega in Seville, Spain, is won by the song "El fandango aquí", written by Marcial Alejandro, and performed by Eugenia León representing Mexico.
- September 22
  - The Farm Aid concert is held in Champaign, Illinois, USA.
  - Massimo Bogianckino, general manager of the Paris Opera and former head of both the Maggio Musicale Fiorentino and La Scala, is elected mayor of Florence.

=== October–December ===
- October 26 – "Saving All My Love for You" by Whitney Houston tops the Billboard Hot 100. It was her first of seven consecutive number-one singles through 1988.
- December 5 – The first fully digital reggae single, Wayne Smith's "(Under Me) Sleng Teng", is recorded at Prince Jammy's studio; it is the beginning of ragga style reggae.
- December 23 – Two young fans of Judas Priest in Sparks, Nevada shoot themselves, one fatally, after listening to the band's records. A lawsuit is brought against the group in 1986 claiming that they were compelled by backwards subliminal messages hidden in their music.
- December 31 – The fourteenth annual New Year's Rockin' Eve special is aired on ABC television, with appearances by Four Tops, The Judds, Barry Manilow, The Motels, Tears for Fears and The Temptations.

=== Also in 1985 ===
- Several hundreds of thousands of US dollars in publishing royalties are released to the surviving members, and families of the deceased members, of the British music group, Badfinger.
- Metal Edge magazine is launched.
- Roger Waters announces his intention to leave Pink Floyd; describing the band as "a spent force creatively", he would spend the next two years in a legal battle with his now-former bandmates over the rights to the "Pink Floyd" name and other associated assets.

== Bands formed ==
- See Musical groups established in 1985

== Bands disbanded ==
- See Musical groups disestablished in 1985

== Albums released ==
=== January ===
Day	Album	Artist	Notes
10	Silvertone	Chris Isaak	-
14	New Day Rising	Hüsker Dü	-
15	Centerfield	John Fogerty	-
15	Nightshift	Commodores	-
21	King of Rock	Run-D.M.C.	-
21	Real Love	Dolly Parton	-
21	Thunder in the East	Loudness	Japan
24	Finder of Lost Loves	Dionne Warwick	-
25	Maverick	George Thorogood and the Destroyers	-
28	Crazy from the Heat	David Lee Roth	Covers EP
29	Stella	Yello	-
?	40-Hour Week	Alabama	-
?	Bring Me the Head of Yuri Gagarin	Hawkwind	Live 1973
?	Night Rocker	David Hasselhoff	-
?	One Clear Moment	Linda Thompson	-
?	Strange Animal	Gowan	-
?	Tales of the New West	The Beat Farmers	-
?	Warming Up to the Ice Age	John Hiatt	-

=== February ===
Day	Album	Artist	Notes
2	VU	The Velvet Underground	-
4	Secret Secrets	Joan Armatrading	-
11	Meat Is Murder	The Smiths	-
11	The Firm	The Firm	Debut
12	Vision Quest	Various Artists	Soundtrack
14	Only Four You	Mary Jane Girls	-
14	Rhythm of the Night	DeBarge	-
14	Whitney Houston	Whitney Houston	Debut
15	Vulture Culture	Alan Parsons Project	-
18	No Jacket Required	Phil Collins	-
19	The Breakfast Club	Various Artists	Soundtrack
25	The Ballad of Sally Rose	Emmylou Harris	-
25	Songs from the Big Chair	Tears for Fears	-
25	Night Time	Killing Joke	-
26	Disturbing the Peace	Alcatrazz	-
28	Ready to Strike	King Kobra	Debut
?	2WO	Strange Advance	-
?	Air Supply	Air Supply	-
?	Armed and Dangerous	Anthrax	EP
?	Beyond Appearances	Santana	-
?	Heads and Hearts	The Sound	-
?	Love Bomb	The Tubes	-
?	Tough All Over	John Cafferty and the Beaver Brown Band	-

=== March ===
Day	Album	Artist	Notes
4	Aikea-Guinea	Cocteau Twins	EP
4	Metal Heart	Accept	-
4	She's the Boss	Mick Jagger	US Release Feb. 19, 1985
8	Mars Needs Guitars!	Hoodoo Gurus	-
8	The Night I Fell in Love	Luther Vandross	-
11	Behind the Sun	Eric Clapton	-
11	Dream into Action	Howard Jones	-
11	First and Last and Always	The Sisters of Mercy	-
15	Everybody's Crazy	Michael Bolton	-
18	Birdy	Peter Gabriel	Soundtrack
21	Up on the Sun	Meat Puppets	-
22	Katrina and the Waves	Katrina and the Waves	-
22	Scream for Help	John Paul Jones	Soundtrack
25	The Power Station	The Power Station	Debut
25	The Secret of Association	Paul Young	-
26	Southern Accents	Tom Petty and the Heartbreakers	-
26	The Right to Rock	Keel	-
27	7800° Fahrenheit	Bon Jovi	-
27	Tao	Rick Springfield	-
29	Bad Moon Rising	Sonic Youth	-
29	Rogues Gallery	Slade	-
?	Equator	Uriah Heep	-
?	Lost & Found	Jason & the Scorchers	-
?	Vox Humana	Kenny Loggins	-

=== April ===
Day	Album	Artist	Notes
1	We Are the World	USA for Africa and Various Artists	-
3	Some People	Belouis Some	Debut
5	Strawberry Switchblade	Strawberry Switchblade	Debut
8	Hell Awaits	Slayer	-
15	As the Band Turns	Atlantic Starr	-
15	Horror Epics	The Exploited	-
15	Lone Justice	Lone Justice	Debut
15	Love Not Money	Everything but the Girl	-
20	Voices Carry	'Til Tuesday	Debut
22	Around the World in a Day	Prince and the Revolution	-
22	Backwaxed	Anvil	Compilation
23	Two Hearts	Men at Work	-
25	Bonded by Blood	Exodus	Debut
28	Rock Me Tonight	Freddie Jackson	Debut
29	Be Yourself Tonight	Eurythmics	-
29	Mr. Bad Guy	Freddie Mercury	-
29	Flaunt the Imperfection	China Crisis	-
?	Across a Crowded Room	Richard Thompson	-
?	Go West	Go West	Debut
?	Nature of the Beast	Maureen Steele	Debut
?	Only the Strong	Thor	-
?	The Ups and Downs	Stephen Duffy	Debut

=== May ===
Day	Album	Artist	Notes
1	Suzanne Vega	Suzanne Vega	Debut
3	Youthquake	Dead or Alive	-
6	Nervous Night	The Hooters	-
13	Brother Where You Bound	Supertramp	-
13	Low-Life	New Order	-
13	On a Storyteller's Night	Magnum	-
14	Loose Nut	Black Flag	-
15	Dangerous	Natalie Cole	-
15	I Don't Want to Grow Up	Descendents	-
15	Soldiers Under Command	Stryper	-
15	Unguarded	Amy Grant	-
17	Brothers in Arms	Dire Straits	-
20	7 Wishes	Night Ranger	-
20	Power of the Night	Savatage	-
20	Shaken 'n' Stirred	Robert Plant	-
20	What Does Anything Mean? Basically	The Chameleons	-
20	Wide Awake in America	U2	EP
21	Glow	Rick James	-
21	The Confessor	Joe Walsh	-
25	Watching You, Watching Me	Bill Withers	-
27	The Return......	Bathory	-
29	Barking at Airplanes	Kim Carnes	-
29	Hellbound	Warlock	-
30	Fear No Evil	Grim Reaper	US
?	Do You Wanna Get Away	Shannon	-
?	Gravity	Kenny G	-
?	Le Parc	Tangerine Dream	-
?	More Places Forever	David Thomas	-
?	Music for "The Knee Plays"	David Byrne	Soundtrack
?	Space Ritual	Hawkwind	Live 1972
?	Theodore and Friends	The Adventures	-

=== June ===
Day	Album	Artist	Notes
1	The Fat Boys Are Back	The Fat Boys	-
1	Hunting High and Low	a-ha	-
3	Boys and Girls	Bryan Ferry	-
3	The Firstborn Is Dead	Nick Cave and the Bad Seeds	-
6	Long Way to Heaven	Helix	-
8	Our Favourite Shop	The Style Council	titled Internationalists in US
10	Another Place	Hiroshima	-
10	Cupid & Psyche 85	Scritti Politti	-
10	Empire Burlesque	Bob Dylan	-
10	Fables of the Reconstruction	R.E.M.	-
10	Little Creatures	Talking Heads	-
10	The Beach Boys	The Beach Boys	-
12	Killing Is My Business... and Business Is Good!	Megadeth	Debut
13	Invasion of Your Privacy	Ratt	-
14	Boy in the Box	Corey Hart	-
15	Alternating Currents	Spyro Gyra	-
17	Crush	Orchestral Manoeuvres in the Dark	-
17	Misplaced Childhood	Marillion	-
17	Single Life	Cameo	-
17	The Dream of the Blue Turtles	Sting	Solo Debut
18	Dare to Be Stupid	"Weird Al" Yankovic	-
20	Welcome to the Real World	Mr. Mister	-
20	World Wide Live	Scorpions	Live Album
21	Despite Straight Lines	Marilyn	-
21	Heart	Heart	First album for Capitol
21	Theatre of Pain	Mötley Crüe	-
22	Steve McQueen	Prefab Sprout	-
24	Open Fire	Y&T	-
27	Call of the Wild	Lee Aaron	-
?	B-Movie Matinee	Nile Rodgers	-
?	Big Lizard in My Backyard	The Dead Milkmen	-
?	Rites of Spring	Rites of Spring	-
?	Telephone Free Landslide Victory	Camper Van Beethoven	-
?	Spoiled Girl	Carly Simon	-

=== July ===
Day	Album	Artist	Notes
1	Clan of Xymox	Clan of Xymox	-
1	Extractions	Dif Juz	-
1	Fly on the Wall	AC/DC	-
1	Greatest Hits Volume I & II	Billy Joel	Compilation
1	Return to Waterloo	Ray Davies	-
3	Patti	Patti LaBelle	-
8	Back to the Future	Various Artists	Soundtrack
8	Flash	Jeff Beck	-
9	Who's Zoomin' Who?	Aretha Franklin	-
12	Camera Obscura	Nico + the Faction	-
12	Love You to Pieces	Lizzy Borden	-
15	Phantasmagoria	The Damned	-
22	Luxury of Life	Five Star	-
22	Standing on the Edge	Cheap Trick	-
26	Hybrid	Michael Brook with Brian Eno and Daniel Lanois	-
26	Mask of Smiles	John Waite	-
29	Profiles	Nick Mason and Rick Fenn	-
30	No Lookin' Back	Michael McDonald	-
?	Ain't Love Grand!	X	-
?	Contact	Pointer Sisters	-
?	Hold Me	Laura Branigan	-
?	In Concert	America	Live
?	Salad Days	Minor Threat	EP
?	St. Elmo's Fire	Various Artists	Soundtrack
?	The Fire Still Burns	Russ Ballard	-

=== August ===
Day	Album	Artist	Notes
2	Lisa Lisa & Cult Jam with Full Force	Lisa Lisa and Cult Jam	-
4	World Class	World Class Wreckin' Cru	-
5	Now That's What I Call Music 5	Various Artists	Compilation
5	Rum Sodomy & the Lash	The Pogues	-
8	Midnite Dynamite	Kix	-
12	Old Ways	Neil Young	-
12	Running Wild	Girlschool	-
12	Sacred Heart	Dio	-
16	Freaky Styley	Red Hot Chili Peppers	-
19	Marching Out	Yngwie Malmsteen	-
19	Scarecrow	John Cougar Mellencamp	-
19	The Family	The Family	-
26	Romance 1600	Sheila E.	-
26	Geisha	Geisha	Debut
29	Alibi	Vandenberg	-
30	The Head on the Door	The Cure	-
?	Cosi Fan Tutti Frutti	Squeeze	-
?	Lovin' Every Minute of It	Loverboy	-
?	Primitive Love	Miami Sound Machine	-
?	Screamin' 'n' Bleedin'	Angel Witch	-
?	The Rose of England	Nick Lowe	-
?	World Service	Spear of Destiny	-

=== September ===
Day	Album	Artist	Notes
2	Baggariddim	UB40	-
2	Innocence Is No Excuse	Saxon	-
2	Run for Cover	Gary Moore	-
4	Living in the Background	Baltimora	-
9	A Cappella	Todd Rundgren	-
9	You're Under Arrest	Miles Davis	-
10	Knee Deep in the Hoopla	Starship	-
13	In Square Circle	Stevie Wonder	-
13	Don't Stand Me Down	Dexys Midnight Runners	-
16	Alabama Christmas	Alabama	Christmas
16	Asylum	Kiss	-
16	Hounds of Love	Kate Bush	-
16	The Dream Academy	The Dream Academy	-
16	The Fury	Gary Numan	-
16	This Is the Sea	The Waterboys	-
17	Here's to Future Days	Thompson Twins	-
17	Ready for the World	Ready for the World	-
18	Tim	The Replacements	-
20	Ignite the Seven Cannons	Felt	-
23	In Mysterious Ways	John Foxx	-
23	The Wishing Chair	10,000 Maniacs	-
23	This Nation's Saving Grace	The Fall	-
24	Eaten Alive	Diana Ross	-
29	Snake Boy	Killdozer	-
30	Crazy Peoples Right to Speak	Kaja	-
30	The Heart of the Matter	Kenny Rogers	-
30	Mad Not Mad	Madness	-
30	Rain Dogs	Tom Waits	-
30	Soul to Soul	Stevie Ray Vaughan	-
30	To Live and Die in L.A.	Wang Chung	Soundtrack
?	Flip Your Wig	Hüsker Dü	-
?	How Could It Be	Eddie Murphy	-
?	Pokkeherrie	The Ex	-
?	The Process of Weeding Out	Black Flag	EP
?	The Small Price of a Bicycle	The Icicle Works	-
?	Under a Raging Moon	Roger Daltrey	-

=== October ===
Day	Album	Artist	Notes
4	How to Be a ... Zillionaire!	ABC	-
4	Giants EP	The Bolshoi	-
5	Esperanto	Ryuichi Sakamoto	-
7	The Gift	Midge Ure	solo debut
11	Believe You Me	Blancmange	-
11	Picture Book	Simply Red	-
11	Power Windows	Rush	Canada
11	Seventh Dream of Teenage Heaven	Love and Rockets	-
14	Listen Like Thieves	INXS	-
14	Live After Death	Iron Maiden	Live
14	The Covenant, the Sword, and the Arm of the Lord	Cabaret Voltaire	-
14	The Jets	The Jets	-
14	The Singles 81→85	Depeche Mode	Compilation
15	Blue	Double	-
15	Falco 3	Falco	-
15	Feel the Fire	Overkill	Debut
16	Seven Churches	Possessed	Debut
17	The Blasting Concept Vol. 2	Various Artists	-
18	Love	The Cult	-
18	World Machine	Level 42	-
21	Mike + The Mechanics	Mike + the Mechanics	Debut
21	Once Upon a Time	Simple Minds	-
22	Twitch	Aldo Nova	-
24	Don't Stop Rappin'	Too Short	LP, Debut
24	Krush Groove	Various Artists	Soundtrack
25	Animosity	Corrosion of Conformity	Debut
25	Greatest Hits	The Cars	Compilation
25	Sun City	Artists United Against Apartheid	-
25	The Last Command	W.A.S.P.	-
28	Afterburner	ZZ Top	-
28	Dead Man's Party	Oingo Boingo	-
28	Slave to the Rhythm	Grace Jones	-
28	What a Life!	Divinyls	-
30	Spreading the Disease	Anthrax	-
?	America	Kurtis Blow	-
?	Love An Adventure	Pseudo Echo	-
?	Cream Corn from the Socket of Davis	Butthole Surfers	UK; EP
?	Dog Eat Dog	Joni Mitchell	-
?	Endless Pain	Kreator	-
?	Eye Dance	Boney M.	-
?	Frankenchrist	Dead Kennedys	-
?	High Priority	Cherrelle	-
?	I Am the Night	Pantera	-
?	In My Head	Black Flag	-
?	Jane Wiedlin	Jane Wiedlin	-
?	Me and the Boys	Charlie Daniels	-
?	Movin'	Jennifer Rush	-
?	Original Masters	Jethro Tull	Compilation
?	Soul Kiss	Olivia Newton-John	-
?	That's Why I'm Here	James Taylor	-
?	The Spectre Within	Fates Warning	-
?	To Mega Therion	Celtic Frost	-

=== November ===
Day	Album	Artist	Notes
1	This Is Big Audio Dynamite	Big Audio Dynamite	-
4	Cut the Crap	The Clash	-
4	Delirious Nomad	Armored Saint	-
4	Every Turn of the World	Christopher Cross	-
4	Down for the Count	Y&T	-
4	Hawkwind Anthology	Hawkwind	Compilation
4	Ice on Fire	Elton John	-
4	Misdemeanor	UFO	-
4	Promise	Sade	UK
4	Riptide	Robert Palmer	-
4	The Singles Collection	Spandau Ballet	Compilation
4	The Broadway Album	Barbra Streisand	-
7	9012Live: The Solos	Yes	US/Live
7	Biograph	Bob Dylan	Box Set
8	All for Love	New Edition	-
11	Astra	Asia	-
11	Bitter Sweet	King	-
11	Catching Up with Depeche Mode	Depeche Mode	US; Compilation
11	Songs to Learn & Sing	Echo & the Bunnymen	Compilation
11	The Chronicle of the Black Sword	Hawkwind	-
11	White City: A Novel	Pete Townshend	-
12	Play Deep	The Outfield	-
13	Seven the Hard Way	Pat Benatar	-
13	Folksinger	Phranc	-
15	Tiny Dynamine	Cocteau Twins	EP
18	3 Ships	Jon Anderson	-
18	Crackers: The Christmas Party Album	Slade	-
18	Psychocandy	The Jesus and Mary Chain	-
18	Radio	LL Cool J	-
18	Rock a Little	Stevie Nicks	-
18	So Red the Rose	Arcadia	-
18	Starpeace	Yoko Ono	-
18	Walls of Jericho	Helloween	-
21	Frank Zappa Meets the Mothers of Prevention	Frank Zappa	-
22	Come Out and Play	Twisted Sister	-
22	Easy Pieces	Lloyd Cole and the Commotions	-
22	Under Lock and Key	Dokken	-
25	Friends	Dionne Warwick	-
25	Now That's What I Call Music 6	Various Artists	Compilation
26	Pack Up the Plantation: Live!	Tom Petty and the Heartbreakers	Live
26	Species Deceases	Midnight Oil	EP
29	Ancient Artifacts	D.I.	Debut
29	Echoes in a Shallow Bay	Cocteau Twins	EP
30	We Care a Lot	Faith No More	-
?	Carnivore	Carnivore	Debut
?	Come On Down	Green River	Debut EP
?	Double Trouble Live	Molly Hatchet	Live
?	Heyday	The Church	-
?	Night of the Crime	Icon	-
?	Old Rottenhat	Robert Wyatt	-
?	Raging Violence	Hirax	-
?	The Wrestling Album	World Wrestling Federation	Soundtrack
?	Who's Missing	The Who	Compilation

=== December ===
Day	Album	Artist	Notes
9	Club Ninja	Blue Öyster Cult	-
9	Fine Young Cannibals	Fine Young Cannibals	-
9	The Long Play	Sandra	-
31	A Classic Case	London Symphony Orchestra	music of Jethro Tull
?	Stereotomy	The Alan Parsons Project	-
?	10 from 6	Bad Company	Compilation
?	3-Way Tie (For Last)	Minutemen	-
?	Friends	Dionne Warwick	-
?	Geek!	My Bloody Valentine	EP
?	Island Life	Grace Jones	Compilation

=== Release date unknown ===
- ...Undone – The Lucy Show
- 7 Day Weekend – The Comsat Angels
- A View to a Kill: Original Motion Picture Soundtrack – John Barry
- Alan Merrill – Alan Merrill
- Another World – The Roches
- Back in the DHSS – Half Man Half Biscuit
- Beat Happening – Beat Happening
- Beat the System – Petra
- Begegnungen II – Eno Moebius Roedelius Plank
- Behaviour – Saga
- Better Off Dead: Original A&M Soundcrack – Various Artists
- Between Heaven 'n Hell – Resurrection Band
- Bites – Skinny Puppy
- Bo Diddley & Co. – Live – Bo Diddley
- Boy Meets Girl - Boy Meets Girl
- Branded and Exiled – Running Wild
- Change No Change – Elliot Easton
- Christmas Time – Chris Stamey
- City Slicker - James Young
- Cock Robin – Cock Robin
- Color of Success – Morris Day
- Commander Sozo and the Charge of the Light Brigade – DeGarmo and Key
- Company of Justice – Play Dead
- Copacabana: The Original Motion Picture Soundtrack Album – Barry Manilow
- Cuori agitati – Eros Ramazzotti
- A Diamond Hidden in the Mouth of a Corpse – Giorno Poetry Systems
- Dinosaur – Dinosaur Jr.
- Do You – Sheena Easton
- Downtown – Marshall Crenshaw
- Every Turn of the World – Christopher Cross
- False Accusations – The Robert Cray Band
- Fear and Whiskey – Mekons
- Feargal Sharkey – Feargal Sharkey (solo debut)
- Flame – Real Life
- For the Working Class Man – Jimmy Barnes
- Forever Running – B-Movie
- Futile Combat – Skeletal Family
- Gas Food Lodging – Green on Red
- The Goonies: Original Motion Picture Soundtrack – Various Artists
- Have Yourself Committed – Bryan Duncan
- Here's the World for Ya - Paul Hyde and the Payolas
- Hero – Clarence Clemons
- The History Mix Volume 1 – Godley & Creme
- Hotline – White Heart
- Immigrant – Gene Loves Jezebel
- In the House – Images in Vogue
- Into the Fire Live – Play Dead
- Just Like Real Life – Prodigal
- Kingdom in the Streets – Dion DiMucci
- Life – Gladys Knight & the Pips
- Little Baggariddim EP – UB40
- Live in Carré – The Dubliners
- Looking at You – Chaz Jankel
- Love Beyond Reason – Randy Stonehill
- Love Hurts – Elaine Paige
- Machine Age Voodoo – SPK
- Manilow – Barry Manilow
- Mayhem – Toyah (compilation)
- Mental Notes – Bad Manners
- Menudo - Menudo
- Minx – Toyah Willcox (solo debut)
- Mistral gagnant – Renaud
- Mud Will Be Flung Tonight – Bette Midler
- My Toot Toot - Jean Knight
- Mystery – RAH Band
- No Muss...No Fuss – Donnie Iris
- Now – The Christmas Album – Various Artists
- Off the Board – Ludichrist
- Oil & Gold – Shriekback
- Old Flame – Juice Newton
- Old Land – Cluster & Brian Eno
- On the Fritz – Steve Taylor
- One for the Road – April Wine
- Once in a Very Blue Moon – Nanci Griffith
- Our Garden Needs Its Flowers – Jess Sah Bi and Peter One
- Partners, Brothers and Friends – Nitty Gritty Dirt Band
- Paul Hardcastle - Paul Hardcastle
- Promesas – José José
- Racer-X – Big Black
- Rescue You – Joe Lynn Turner
- Resistance – Burning Spear
- Rhythm Romance – The Romantics
- Roger Miller - Roger Miller
- Romance – David Cassidy
- Say You Love Me – Jennifer Holliday
- A Secret Wish – Propaganda
- A Sense of Wonder – Van Morrison
- Shamrock Diaries – Chris Rea
- Skin Dive – Michael Franks
- So Many Rivers – Bobby Womack
- Some of My Best Jokes Are Friends – George Clinton
- Stages – Triumph
- Stay Hard – Raven
- Steady Nerves – Graham Parker and The Shot
- Stop! - The Chesterfield Kings
- Syirin Farthat – Elvy Sukaesih
- Talk about the Weather – Red Lorry Yellow Lorry
- Through a Window – Patrick Sky
- Thursday Afternoon – Brian Eno
- The UB40 File – UB40
- U.T.F.O. – UTFO
- Vassar Clements, John Hartford, Dave Holland – Vassar Clements, John Hartford, Dave Holland
- What If - Tommy Shaw
- Walking Through Fire - April Wine
- Whatever Happened to Jugula? – Roy Harper
- Without Love – Black N' Blue
- Wonderful – Circle Jerks
- Zaman – Ebiet G. Ade

== Biggest hit singles ==
The following songs achieved the highest in the charts of 1985.

#	Artist	Title	Year	Country	Chart Entries
1	USA for Africa	"We Are the World"	1985	(United States)	UK 1 - Apr 1985 (10 weeks), US Billboard 1 - Mar 1985 (18 weeks), US CashBox 1 of 1985, Canada 1 - Apr 1985 (8 weeks), Holland 1 - Mar 1985 (16 weeks), Sweden 1 - Mar 1985 (7 weeks), Sweden (alt) 1 - Apr 1985 (22 weeks), Brazil 1 of 1985, Switzerland 1 - Apr 1985 (26 weeks), Norway 1 - Mar 1985 (17 weeks), Poland 1 - Mar 1983 (17 weeks), Belgium 1 - Mar 1985 (18 weeks), Australia 1 of 1985, Italy 1 of 1985, Italy 1 for 11 weeks - Apr 1985, Eire 1 for 4 weeks - Apr 1985, Canada RPM 1 for 3 weeks - May 1985, New Zealand 1 for 7 weeks - Apr 1985, Australia 1 for 9 weeks - Apr 1985, Springbok 1 - May 1985 (23 weeks), Europe 1 for 9 weeks - Apr 1985, Grammy in 1985, US 4 X Platinum (certified by RIAA in Apr 1985), Austria 2 - Apr 1985 (5 months), Germany 2 - Apr 1985 (3 months), ODK Germany 2 - Apr 1985 (21 weeks) (7 weeks in top 10), MTV Video of the year 1985 (Nominated), Switzerland 4 of 1985, US Radio 6 of 1985 (peak 1 9 weeks), South Africa 8 of 1985, ARC 13 of 1985 (peak 1 12 weeks), US BB 20 of 1985, Canada 23 of 1985, nuTsie 37 of 1980s, POP 71 of 1985, DMDB 86 (1985), RIAA 121, France (InfoDisc) 131 of the 1980s (peak 1, 25 weeks, 965k sales estimated, 1985), Germany 263 of the 1980s (peak 2 10 weeks), OzNet 418, Acclaimed 1371 (1985), UK Silver (certified by BPI in Apr 1985), Global 4 (20 M sold) - 1985
2	a-ha	"Take On Me"	1984	(Norway)	US Billboard 1 - Jul 1985 (26 weeks), Canada 1 - Aug 1985 (11 weeks), Holland 1 - Oct 1985 (12 weeks), Sweden (alt) 1 - Oct 1985 (11 weeks), France 1 - May 1985 (3 weeks), Switzerland 1 - Nov 1985 (14 weeks), Norway 1 - Nov 1984 (29 weeks), Poland 1 - Dec 1985 (24 weeks), Belgium 1 - Nov 1985 (14 weeks), Italy 1 for 4 weeks - Jan 1986, Germany 1 - Jan 1986 (4 months), ODK Germany 1 - Oct 1985 (21 weeks) (5 weeks at number 1) (12 weeks in top 10), Australia 1 for 2 weeks - Nov 1985, Europe 1 for 9 weeks - Nov 1985, Germany 1 for 5 weeks - Nov 1985, Scrobulate 1 of 80s, UK 2 - Sep 1985 (19 weeks), MTV Video of the year 1986 (Nominated), Sweden 4 - Aug 1985 (6 weeks), Austria 4 - Dec 1985 (3 months), UK Gold (certified by BPI in Nov 1985), Germany Gold (certified by BMieV in 1985), Italy 7 of 1986, Springbok 7 - Dec 1985 (12 weeks), KROQ 7 of 1985, US BB 10 of 1985, Australia 12 of 1985, US CashBox 15 of 1985, Brazil 18 of 1985, ARC 20 of 1985 (peak 1 14 weeks), Europe 20 of the 1980s (1985), US Radio 21 of 1985 (peak 1 10 weeks), Canada 29 of 1985, POP 31 of 1985, Vinyl Surrender 71 (1985), Germany 81 of the 1980s (peak 1 13 weeks), UK Songs 2013-23 peak 85 - Nov 2023 (1 week), nuTsie 93 of 1980s, France (InfoDisc) 235 of the 1980s (peak 2, 29 weeks, 736k sales estimated, 1985), UKMIX 514, OzNet 795, Acclaimed 2396 (1985), RYM 8 of 1984, NY Daily Love list 66, Global 33 (5 M sold) - 1985, Party 133 of 2007
3	Foreigner	"I Want to Know What Love Is"	1984	(United Kingdom) (United States)	UK 1 - Dec 1984 (17 weeks), US Billboard 1 - Dec 1984 (20 weeks), Canada 1 - Dec 1984 (18 weeks), Sweden 1 - Dec 1984 (9 weeks), Sweden (alt) 1 - Dec 1984 (19 weeks), Norway 1 - Jan 1985 (16 weeks), Poland 1 - Mar 1983 (22 weeks), Eire 1 for 2 weeks - Jan 1985, Canada RPM 1 for 3 weeks - Feb 1985, New Zealand 1 for 3 weeks - Feb 1985, Australia 1 for 5 weeks - Feb 1985, Switzerland 2 - Jan 1985 (17 weeks), Springbok 2 - Feb 1985 (17 weeks), ARC 3 of 1985 (peak 1 16 weeks), ODK Germany 3 - Dec 1984 (22 weeks) (8 weeks in top 10), Canada 3 of 1985, US BB 4 of 1985, US Radio 4 of 1985 (peak 1 11 weeks), Germany 4 - Jan 1985 (4 months), US Gold (certified by RIAA in Mar 1985), UK Gold (certified by BPI in Jan 1985), Australia 5 of 1985, Holland 6 - Dec 1984 (15 weeks), Austria 7 - Feb 1985 (4 months), Belgium 7 - Dec 1984 (14 weeks), US CashBox 8 of 1985, Brazil 12 of 1985, Switzerland 12 of 1985, South Africa 12 of 1985, POP 17 of 1985, Europe 38 of the 1980s (1984), Holland free40 74 of 1985, OzNet 180, Germany 255 of the 1980s (peak 3 12 weeks), Rolling Stone 476, Acclaimed 659 (1984), UKMIX 876, RYM 186 of 1984
4	Tears for Fears	"Shout"	1984	(United Kingdom)	US BB 1 – Jun 1985, Canada 1 – Feb 1985, Netherlands 1 – Jan 1985, Switzerland 1 – Feb 1985, Germany 1 – Jan 1985, New Zealand 1 for 3 weeks Mar 1985, Australia 1 for 1 weeks Nov 1985, France 3 – Dec 1984, Poland 3 – Mar 1985, UK 4 – Dec 1984, Sweden 5 – Dec 1984, Norway 5 – Mar 1985, KROQ 5 of 1985, Austria 6 – Mar 1985, US CashBox 13 of 1985, Australia 14 of 1985, Sweden (alt) 16 – Feb 1985, South Africa 16 of 1985, Italy 20 of 1985, RYM 27 of 1984, Scrobulate 36 of 80s, Germany 104 of the 1980s, Acclaimed 974
5	Lionel Richie	"Say You, Say Me"	1985	(United States)	US Billboard 1 - Nov 1985 (19 weeks), Canada 1 - Nov 1985 (11 weeks), Switzerland 1 - Dec 1985 (16 weeks), Norway 1 - Nov 1985 (15 weeks), Canada RPM 1 for 4 weeks - Dec 1985, Springbok 1 - Nov 1985 (26 weeks), South Africa 1 of 1986, Oscar in 1985 (film ' '), Golden Globe in 1985 (film 'White Nights'), US BB 2 of 1986, Holland 2 - Nov 1985 (13 weeks), Sweden 2 - Nov 1985 (6 weeks), Belgium 2 - Nov 1985 (15 weeks), US Radio 3 of 1985 (peak 1 11 weeks), US Gold (certified by RIAA in Jan 1986), Sweden (alt) 6 - Nov 1985 (5 weeks), Austria 6 - Jan 1986 (4 months), Poland 7 - Nov 1985 (6 weeks), UK 8 - Nov 1985 (13 weeks), Switzerland 8 of 1986, ARC 9 of 1985 (peak 1 14 weeks), ODK Germany 12 - Dec 1985 (19 weeks), Germany 14 - Jan 1986 (3 months), Brazil 15 of 1986, US CashBox 23 of 1986, Italy 28 of 1986, POP 33 of 1985, Canada 40 of 1986, Billboard 50th song 74, 55th Billboard 100 84 (1985), Billboard100 89

== Top 41 Chart hit singles ==
Song title	Artist(s)	Release date(s)	US	UK	Highest chart position	Other Chart Performance(s)
"19"	Paul Hardcastle	April 1985	15	1	(12 countries)	See chart performance entry
"Alive and Kicking"	Simple Minds	September 1985	3	7	1 (Italy)	See chart performance entry
"All I Need"	Jack Wagner	January 1985	2	n/a	2 (United States)	1 (Canada RPM Adult Contemporary) – 1 (U.S. Billboard Adult Contemporary) – 2 (U.S. Cash Box Top 100) – 3 (Canada) – 93 (Australia)
"And We Danced"	The Hooters	August 1985	21	n/a	6 (Australia)	9 (New Zealand) – 72 (West Germany)
"Angel"	Madonna	April 1985	5	5	1 (Australia)	See chart performance entry

=== Other chart hit singles ===
- "A View to a Kill" – Duran Duran
- "Better Be Good To Me" (1984) – Tina Turner
- "Body & Soul" – Mai Tai
- "Body Rock" (1984) – Maria Vidal
- "Born in the U.S.A." (1984) – Bruce Springsteen (released in 1984)
- "The Boy with the Thorn in His Side" – The Smiths
- "The Boys of Summer" (1984) – Don Henley
- "Broken Wings" – Mr. Mister
- "Brothers in Arms" – Dire Straits
- "Borderline" (1983) – Madonna (UK release)
- "Call Me" – Go West
- "Cannonball" – Supertramp
- "Can't Fight This Feeling" (1984) – REO Speedwagon
- "Careless Whisper" (1984) – Wham!
- "Centerfield" – John Fogerty
- "C'était mon ami" – Dalida
- "Chain Reaction" – Diana Ross
- "Change Your Mind" – Sharpe & Numan
- "Cheri, Cheri Lady" – Modern Talking
- "Cherish" – Kool & the Gang
- "Close to Me" – The Cure
- "Cloudbusting" – Kate Bush
- "Color My Love" – Fun Fun (Released in 1984)
- "Could It Be I'm Falling in Love" – David Grant and Jaki Graham
- "Crazy for You" – Madonna
- "Dancing in the Street" – David Bowie and Mick Jagger
- "Devuélveme a mi chica" – Hombres G
- "Dirty Old Town" – The Pogues
- "Don't Come Around Here No More" – Tom Petty and the Heartbreakers
- "Don't You (Forget About Me)" – Simple Minds
- "Dress You Up" – Madonna
- "Duel" – Propaganda
- "Eaten Alive" – Diana Ross
- "E=MC²" – Big Audio Dynamite
- "Election Day" – Arcadia
- "Éthiopie" – Chanteurs sans Frontières
- "Everybody Wants to Rule the World" (1984) – Tears for Fears
- "Everything She Wants" (1984) – Wham!
- "Everytime You Go Away" – Paul Young
- "Faron Young" – Prefab Sprout
- "Find A Way" – Amy Grant
- "Fortress Around Your Heart" – Sting
- "Frankie" – Sister Sledge
- "Freak A Ristic" – Atlantic Starr
- "Freaks Come Out at Night" (1984) – Whodini
- "Fresh" (1984) – Kool & the Gang
- "Freeway of Love" – Aretha Franklin
- "Gambler" – Madonna
- "Get It On" – The Power Station
- "Gimme, Gimme, Gimme" – Narada Michael Walden and Patti Austin
- "Glory Days" (1984) – Bruce Springsteen
- "Goodbye Is Forever" – Arcadia
- "The Goonies 'R' Good Enough" – Cyndi Lauper
- "(Gotta Be) Wrong Way To Love" – Dynamic Hepnotics
- "Head Over Heels" (1984) – Tears for Fears
- "Heart User" – Cliff Richard
- "The Heat Is On" – Glenn Frey
- "Heaven" – Bryan Adams
- "History" – Mai Tai
- "Hold Me" – Menudo
- "Holding Back The Years" – Simply Red (charted in 1986 in the U.S.)
- "Home Sweet Home" – Mötley Crüe
- "Hounds of Love" – Kate Bush
- "How Soon Is Now?" – The Smiths (originally released in 1984 as a B-side)
- "How Will I Know" – Whitney Houston
- "Hurt" – Juice Newton
- "I Don't Think I'm Ready for You" – Anne Murray
- "I Miss You" – Klymaxx
- "I Want to Know What Love Is" (1984) – Foreigner
- "I Was Born to Love You" – Freddie Mercury
- "If Ever You're in My Arms Again" – Peabo Bryson
- "If You Love Somebody Set Them Free" – Sting
- "(I'll Never Be) Maria Magdalena" – Sandra
- "I'm On Fire" (1984) – Bruce Springsteen
- "In Between Days" – The Cure
- "In My House" – Mary Jane Girls
- "In The Heat Of The Night" – Sandra
- "Innocent" – Alexander O'Neal
- "Into the Groove" – Madonna
- "Invincible" – Pat Benatar
- "It's Alright (Baby's Coming Back)" – Eurythmics
- "Je te donne" – Jean-Jacques Goldman and Michael Jones
- "Johnny Come Home" – Fine Young Cannibals
- "Johnny, Johnny" – Jeanne Mas
- "Just Like Honey" – The Jesus and Mary Chain
- "Kayleigh" – Marillion
- "Kiss the Dirt (Falling Down the Mountain)" – INXS
- "Lay Your Hands on Me" – Thompson Twins
- "Le temps d'aimer" – Dalida
- "Le Vénitien de Levallois" – Dalida
- "Lean on Me (ah-li-ayo)" – Red Box
- "Let's Go Crazy/Take Me With U" – Prince and the Revolution (released in 1984)
- "Listen Like Thieves" – INXS
- "Life in a Northern Town" – The Dream Academy
- "Live Is Life" – Opus
- "Living on My Own" – Freddie Mercury
- "Love Like Blood" – Killing Joke
- "Lovergirl" – Teena Marie
- "Lover Why" – Century
- "Loverboy" – Billy Ocean
- "Lovin' Every Minute of It" – Loverboy
- "Madhouse" – Anthrax
- "Manhattan Project" – Rush
- "Marcia baila" – Rita Mitsouko
- "Material Girl" – Madonna
- "Miami Vice Theme" – Jan Hammer
- "Merry Christmas Everyone" – Shakin' Stevens
- "Method of Modern Love" – Hall & Oates (released in 1984)
- "Money Changes Everything" – Cyndi Lauper
- "Money for Nothing" – Dire Straits
- "Mothers Talk" – Tears For Fears (released in 1984)
- "Move Closer" – Phyllis Nelson
- "Mystic Rhythms" – Rush
- "Neutron Dance" – The Pointer Sisters (released in 1984)
- "Never" – Heart
- "Never Surrender" – Corey Hart
- "A New England" – Kirsty MacColl
- "Ni tú ni nadie" – Alaska y Dinarama
- "Nightshift" – The Commodores
- "Nikita" – Elton John
- "Obsession" – Animotion
- "Oh Sheila" – Ready for the World
- "The Old Man Down The Road" – John Fogerty
- "One More Night" – Phil Collins
- "One Night in Bangkok" – Murray Head
- "One Of The Living" – Tina Turner
- "One Vision" – Queen
- "Only the Young" (recorded 1983) – Journey
- "Out Of Mind Out Of Sight" – Models
- "Part-Time Lover" – Stevie Wonder
- "Party All the Time" – Eddie Murphy
- "Point of No Return" – Exposé
- "The Power of Love" – Huey Lewis and the News
- "The Power of Love (You Are My Lady)" – Air Supply
- "Private Dancer" – Tina Turner
- "Rage to Love" – Kim Wilde
- "Raspberry Beret" – Prince and the Revolution
- "Reviens-moi" – Dalida
- "Running Up that Hill" – Kate Bush
- "Russians" – Sting
- "Samurai" – Michael Cretu
- "Saving All My Love for You" – Whitney Houston
- "Say I'm Your Number One" – Princess
- "Say You, Say Me" – Lionel Richie
- "Secret Lovers" – Atlantic Starr
- "See the Day" – Dee C. Lee
- "Separate Lives" – Phil Collins with Marilyn Martin
- "Shake the Disease" – Depeche Mode
- "Shout" – Tears for Fears
- "So Far Away" – Dire Straits
- "So In Love" – Orchestral Manoeuvres in the Dark
- "Some Heads Are Gonna Roll" (1984) – Judas Priest
- "Some Like It Hot" – The Power Station
- "Somebody" (1984) – Bryan Adams
- "Something About You" – Level 42 (charted in 1986 in the U.S.)
- "Square Rooms" – Al Corley
- "St. Elmo's Fire (Man in Motion)" – John Parr
- "Suddenly" – Billy Ocean
- "Summer of '69" (1984) – Bryan Adams
- "The Sun Always Shines on TV" – a-ha
- "The Super Bowl Shuffle" – 1985 Chicago Bears
- "Sussudio" – Phil Collins
- "Take On Me" (1985 version) – a-ha
- "Tarzan Boy" – Baltimora
- "That Joke Isn't Funny Anymore" – The Smiths
- "That's What Friends Are For" – Dionne Warwick (duets with Elton John, Gladys Knight & Stevie Wonder) (#1 in Australia, UK, PQ)
- "There Must Be an Angel (Playing with My Heart)" – Eurythmics feat. Stevie Wonder
- "Things Can Only Get Better" – Howard Jones
- "This Is England" – The Clash
- "This Time" – INXS
- "Time Don't Run Out on Me" – Anne Murray
- "Too Late For Goodbyes" – Julian Lennon
- "Venezia" – Hombres G
- "Walk of Life" – Dire Straits
- "Walls Come Tumbling Down" – The Style Council
- "We Are the World" – USA for Africa
- "We Built This City" – Starship
- "We Belong" – Pat Benatar (released in 1984)
- "We Close Our Eyes" – Go West
- "We Don't Need Another Hero" – Tina Turner
- "West End Girls" (second release) – Pet Shop Boys
- "What You Need" – INXS
- "Who's Zoomin' Who?" – Aretha Franklin
- "The Whole Of The Moon" – The Waterboys
- "Working Class Man" – Jimmy Barnes
- "Would I Lie To You?" – Eurythmics
- "Wrap Her Up" – Elton John
- "You Belong to the City" – Glenn Frey
- "You Give Good Love" – Whitney Houston
- "You Make Me Want to Make You Mine" – Juice Newton
- "You Spin Me Round (Like a Record)" – Dead or Alive
- "Your Personal Touch" – Evelyn "Champagne" King
- "You're My Heart, You're My Soul" – Modern Talking
- "You're Only Human (Second Wind)" – Billy Joel
- "You're the Inspiration" – Chicago (released in 1984)

== Notable singles ==
Song title	Artist(s)	Release date(s)	Other Chart Performance(s)
"Love Like Blood"	Killing Joke	September 1985	See chart performance entry
"The Boy with the Thorn in His Side"	The Smiths	September 1985	15 (Ireland) – 23 (UK Singles Chart)
"You Don't Miss Your Water"	The Triffids	August 1985	n/a
" King of Rock"	Run-DMC	January 1985	8 (US Billboard Bubbling Under Hot 100 Singles) – 14 (US Billboard Hot Black Singles) – 40 (US Billboard Dance Music/Club Play Singles) – 80 (UK Singles Charts)
"Makes No Sense at All"	Hüsker Dü	August 1985	2 (UK Indie Chart)
"Oh Yeah"	Yello	July 1985	8 (Australia) – 36 (US Billboard Dance Club Songs) – 47 (Germany) – 51 (US Billboard Hot 100 Charts)
"Vicious Games"	Yello	February 1985	5 (Switzerland) – 8 (US Billboard Dance Club Singles) – 15 (Germany) – 60 (Australia)

=== Other Notable singles ===
- "Man Overboard" – Do-Re-Mi
- "Yummer Yummer Man" – Danielle Dax

== Classical music ==
- John Adams
  - The Chairman Dances
  - Harmonielehre
- Kalevi Aho
  - Oboe Sonata
  - Solo II, for piano
- Pierre Boulez
  - Dialogue de l'ombre double for clarinet and electronics
  - Memoriale (... explosante fixe... Originel) for flute and ensemble
- Mario Davidovsky – Capriccio for two pianos
- Peter Maxwell Davies – An Orkney Wedding, with Sunrise
- James Dillon – Windows and Canopies, small orchestra (20 players)
- Henri Dutilleux – L'arbre des Songes (violin concerto)
- Roland Dyens – Tango en Skaï, for guitar
- Morton Feldman
  - Coptic Light, for orchestra
  - For Bunita Marcus, for piano
  - Violin and String Quartet
  - Piano and String Quartet
- Brian Ferneyhough – Etudes Transcendantales for soprano and chamber ensemble
- Lorenzo Ferrero
  - Canzoni d'amore (song cycle)
  - Empty Stage
  - My Rock
- Beat Furrer – String Quartet No. 1
- Karel Goeyvaerts
  - Pas à pas, for solo piano
  - Les Voix de Verseau, for soprano, flute, clarinet, violin, cello, and piano
- Henryk Górecki
  - O Domina Nostra, Op. 55, soprano and organ
  - Five Marian Songs, Op. 54, chorus a cappella
- Gérard Grisey – Les espaces acoustiques – VI – Epilogue, for 4 solo horns and large orchestra
- Jacques Hétu – Missa pro trecentisimo anno
- Hans Werner Henze – Selbst- und Zwiegespräche
- Heinz Holliger – Präludium, Arioso and Passacaglia, for two guitars
- Nicholas Jackson – Organ Sonata
- Tristan Keuris
  - String Quartet No. 2
  - Variations for Strings
  - Aria for flute and piano
- György Ligeti – Études pour piano, Book 1, six etudes
- Andrew Lloyd Webber – Requiem
- Witold Lutosławski – Chain 2 for violin and orchestra
- Tristan Murail – Time and Again, for orchestra
- Arvo Pärt – Stabat Mater for 3 voices and string trio
- Einojuhani Rautavaara – Symphony No. 5 Monologue with Angels
- John Rutter – Requiem
- Giacinto Scelsi – String Quartet No. 5
- Alfred Schnittke
  - Concerto for mixed chorus
  - Concerto Grosso No. 3 for two violins, harpsichord, celesta, piano and 14 strings
  - String Trio
  - Concerto for viola and orchestra
- Salvatore Sciarrino
  - Allegoria della notte, symphonic work
  - Canzona di ringraziamento
  - Lo spazio inverso
- Isabel Soveral – Fragmentos
- Karlheinz Stockhausen – Ave, for basset horn and alto flute
- Tōru Takemitsu – Dream/Window, for orchestra
- Joan Tower – Piano Concerto
- Manfred Trojahn
  - Requiem
  - Symphony No. 3
- Erkki-Sven Tüür – String Quartet "In memoriam Urmas Kibuspuu"
- Robert Ward – Raleigh Divertimento

== Opera ==
- Dominick Argento – Casanova's Homecoming
- Lorenzo Ferrero
  - Mare nostro
  - Night
- Philip Glass and Robert Moran – The Juniper Tree
- Hans Werner Henze – The English Cat (first English language production)
- Dorothy Rudd Moore – Frederick Douglass
- Salvatore Sciarrino – La perfezione di uno spirito sottile

== Ballet ==
- Lorenzo Ferrero
  - Lotus Eaters
  - The Miracle

== Musical theater ==
- Big River – Broadway production opened at the Eugene O'Neill Theatre and ran for 1005 performances
- Dames at Sea – off Broadway revival
- The King and I (Rodgers & Hammerstein) – Broadway revival
- Leader of the Pack – Broadway production opened at the Ambassador Theatre and ran for 120 performances
- Me and My Girl (Noel Gay) – London revival
- Les Misérables – London production opened in October and has been continuously running since, becoming the longest running musical in West End history.
- The Mystery of Edwin Drood – Broadway production opened at the Imperial Theatre and ran for 108 performances
- Seven Brides for Seven Brothers (Saul Chaplin, Gene de Paul and Johnny Mercer) – London production
- Singin' in the Rain – Broadway production (based on 1952 film of the same name)
- Song and Dance – Broadway production opened at the Royale Theatre and ran for 474 performances

== Musical films ==
- A Chorus Line
- Alag Alag
- Donga
- Hum Dono
- Kathodu Kathoram
- Krush Groove
- Naná
- Rappin'
- That's Dancing!

== Births ==
- January 2 – Luis Beza, American trumpet player (Suburban Legends)
- January 3 – Justin Paul, American singer, composer and lyricist (Pasek and Paul )
- January 6 – Amalie Bruun, Danish multi instrumentalist, singer and actress.
- January 8 – Rachael Lampa, American contemporary Christian singer, songwriter and record producer.
- January 16 – Gintaras Janusevicius, Lithuanian classical pianist
- January 18 – Simone Simons, Dutch symphonic metal singer/songwriter
- January 19 – Rika Ishikawa, Japanese singer, actress, model and dancer (Morning Musume)
- January 22 – Orianthi, Australian musician, singer and songwriter
- January 23 – Donnie Klang, American R&B singer
- January 24
  - Frankie J. Galasso, American singer and actor (Dream Street)
  - Josie Gibson, English television personality
- January 28
  - András Kállay-Saunders, Hungarian-born American recording artist, songwriter and record producer
  - J. Cole, German-American hip-hop recording artist and record producer
- January 29
  - Mikey Hachey, American bass player
  - Giovanna Fletcher, British author, stage actress, singer, and internet personality (wife of Tom Fletcher of Mcfly, sister in law of Carrie Hope Fletcher)
- January 31 – Kalomira, American-Greek singer
- February 1 – Shellback (record producer), Swedish record producer, songwriter and multi-instrumentalist
- February 5 – Lindsey Cardinale, American singer
- February 8 – Jeremy Davis, American bass player and songwriter (Paramore)
- February 11 – William Beckett, American singer-songwriter and guitarist (The Academy Is...)
- February 14 – Havana Brown, Australian DJ, recording artist, record producer and dancer
- February 14 – Lee Hae-ri, South Korean singer (Davichi)
- February 17 – Anne Curtis, Filipina actress, recording artist, entertainer, sister of Jasmine Curtis-Smith, and married to Erwan Heussaff, brother of Solenn Heussaff
- February 19 – Haylie Duff, American actress, singer-songwriter, television host, writer and fashion designer (sister of Hilary Duff)
- February 20 – Yulia Volkova, Russian singer, (t.A.T.u.)
- February 21 – Emelie Norenberg, Swedish singer (Play)
- February 26 – Miki Fujimoto, Japanese singer, actress, dancer and model (Morning Musume)
- February 27 – Seo Hyun-jin, South Korean actress and singer (Milk)
- February 27 – Heléne Yorke, Canadian-American actress, writer, singer, and dancer.
- February 28 – Fefe Dobson, Canadian songwriter
- March 4 – Scott Michael Foster, American actor and singer (Crazy Ex Girlfriend)
- March 8 – Ewa Sonnet, Polish model and singer
- March 12 – Stromae, Belgian musician, rapper, singer and songwriter
- March 17 – Anne Ross, German singer
- March 18 – Theodora Richards, American model daughter of Keith Richards and Patti Hansen
- March 18 – Marvin Humes, English singer (JLS)
- March 24 – Amanda, French-Swedish pop singer
- March 25 – Carmen Rasmusen, Canadian-American singer
- March 26 – Kim Jung-mo, South Korean musician (TRAX)
- March 29
  - Mirusia Louwerse, Dutch-Australian lyric soprano
  - Emil Nava, British music video director
- April 3 – Leona Lewis, British singer, songwriter, actress, model and activist.
- April 7 – Saad Lamjarred, Moroccan singer-songwriter, multi-instrumentalist, dancer, record producer and actor
- April 9
  - Tim Bendzko, German singer-songwriter
  - Tomohisa Yamashita, Japanese singer and actor
  - Senidah, Slovenian singer-songwriter
- April 10 – Incredible Polo (Paul Malburet), French musician and game developer (Incredibox)
- April 12
  - Hitomi Yoshizawa, Japanese singer and actress (Morning Musume)
  - Olga Seryabkina, Russian singer-songwriter (Serebro)
- April 18 – Elena Temnikova, Russian singer and television personality (Serebro)
- April 20 – Jadyn Douglas, Puerto Rican-American singer-songwriter and actress
- April 21 – Jessica Clark, English model and actress
- April 24 – Courtnee Draper, American actress and singer
- April 25 – Morgan Evans, Australian country music singer and songwriter (Kelsea Ballerini)
- May 2 – Lily Allen, English singer-songwriter
- May 3
  - Louis Cato, American drummer, bassist, guitarist, singer, and composer
  - Greg Raposo, American singer and actor (Dream Street)
- May 4
  - Jidenna, Nigerian-American rapper, singer-songwriter and record producer
  - Jme, British grime MC, songwriter, record producer and DJ
  - Anthony Fedorov, American singer
- May 7 – J Balvin, Colombian reggaeton singer
- May 10 – Ashley Poole, American singer (Dream)
- May 11 – Matt Giraud, American singer-songwriter and pianist
- May 17 – Derek Hough, American Latin and ballroom dancer, choreographer, actor and singer
- May 18 – Francesca Battistelli, American singer-songwriter
- May 21
  - Kano, British rapper, songwriter
  - Mutya Buena, English R&B singer (Sugababes)
- May 22 – Vangie Tang, Hong Kong singer
- May 25 – Kim Isak, American-South Korean singer and actress (Isak N Jiyeon)
- May 28
  - Colbie Caillat, American singer/songwriter/musician
  - Carey Mulligan, English actress and singer
  - J. R. Writer, American rapper (The Diplomats)
- May 30
  - Clarence Clarity, English singer, songwriter, producer, and musician
  - Katie Stelmanis, Canadian musician and producer
  - Miriam Cani, Albanian singer
- June 4 – Alicja Janosz, Polish singer
- June 7 – Charlie Simpson, English singer, songwriter and musician (Busted)
- June 9 – Benj Pasek, American singer-songwriter and composer (Pasek and Paul)
- June 9 – Jon Nørgaard, Danish singer
- June 11 – Chris Trousdale, American singer, dancer and actor (Dream Street) (d. 2020)
- June 12 – Phil Lam, Canadian-born Hong Kong singer-songwriter
- June 13 – Raz-B, American singer, rapper and actor (B2K)
- June 15 – Nadine Coyle, Irish pop singer-songwriter, actress and model (Girls Aloud)
- June 17 – Andrea Demirović, Montenegrin pop singer
- June 18 – Jimmie Allen, American singer
- June 20
  - Caroline Polachek, American musician, singer-songwriter, activist and record producer known as the vocalist for Chairlift
  - Julian Corrie, English keyboardist and singer (Franz Ferdinand)
- June 21
  - Kris Allen, American singer
  - Lana Del Rey, American singer-songwriter, director, model, poet and activist
- June 22 – Scott MacIntyre, American singer-songwriter and pianist
- June 23 – Kavka Shishido, Japanese drummer and vocalist
- June 24 – Aste, Finnish rapper
- June 30
  - K.Flay, born Kristine Flaherty, American singer-songwriter and rapper
  - Hugh Sheridan, Australian actor, singer, musician, activist and television presenter
- July 2
  - Ashley Tisdale, American singer, actress, producer, songwriter and YouTuber (High School Musical, Phineas and Ferb, Vanessa Hudgens)
  - Zach Dawes, American musician, producer, engineer, and technician (Frequently works with: Lana Del Rey, Sharon Van Etten)
  - Sindy Auvity, French singer
- July 4
  - Mariana Rios, Brazilian actress and singer
  - Lartiste, Moroccan-French singer and rapper
- July 5 – Alle Farben, German DJ and producer
- July 6
  - Diamond Rings, Canadian singer-songwriter, guitarist and producer (Matters)
  - D. Woods, American singer, dancer and actress (Danity Kane)
  - Andrea Myrander, Swedish pop singer (Basic Element)
- July 9 – Lee Hee-ah, South Korean handicapped pianist
- July 10 – Emily King, American singer-songwriter
- July 11 – Tobias Jesso Jr., Canadian musician
- July 12 – Luiz Ejlli, Albanian singer
- July 15 – Nathaniel Willemse, South African-born Australian singer and songwriter
- July 17
  - Tom Fletcher British singer/songwriter/musician (member of McFLY, brother of Carrie Hope Fletcher)
  - Taylor Goldsmith, American singer-songwriter and guitarist, (lead singer and chief songwriter of the American folk rock band Dawes) (Married and worked with Mandy Moore)
- July 18
  - Hopsin, American rapper, producer and actor
  - Christine Milton, Danish actress, singer and songwriter
- July 19 – Amy Pearson, English singer-songwriter
- July 20 – Solenn Heussaff, Filipina singer, entertainer, and sister-in-law of Anne Curtis
- July 24 – Grace Petrie, English folk singer-songwriter and guitarist
- July 31
  - Alissa White-Gluz, Canadian singer-songwriter (The Agonist, Arch Enemy)
  - Allie X, Canadian singer-songwriter
  - Goldie Boutilier, Singer, songwriter, DJ, and model
- August 1 – Dina, Norwegian singer
- August 2 – Britt Nicole, American vocalist, songwriter and recording artist.
- August 3
  - Holly Blake-Arnstein, American singer (Dream)
  - Brent Kutzle, American musician (OneRepublic)
- August 4
  - Crystal Bowersox, American singer
  - Kina Grannis, American singer-songwriter, guitarist and YouTuber
- August 5 – Annalisa, Italian singer-songwriter and musician
- August 6 – AMES, American singer-songwriter and musician
- August 9
  - Anna Kendrick, American actress/singer
  - Hong Jin-young, South Korean trot singer, actress, and entertainer
- August 11 – Asher Roth, American rapper
- August 11 – J-Boog, American singer (B2K)
- August 13 – Lacey Brown, American singer-songwriter
- August 15
  - Nipsey Hussle, American rapper, singer and businessman (d. 2019)
  - Emily Kinney, American actress, singer, and songwriter
- August 16
  - Cristin Milioti, American actress, singer and musician
  - Taylor Goldsmith, American singer-songwriter, guitarist, and record producer (Member of band Dawes, Husband and musical collaborator of Mandy Moore)
  - Arden Cho, American actress, singer and model
- August 19 – David A. Gregory, American actor and writer
- August 25 – Andien, Indonesian jazz singer
- August 27 – Hannah Peel, Northern Ireland composer
- August 29 – Achilles Liarmakopoulos, Greek trombonist (Canadian Brass)
- August 31 – Sarah Jones, English musician and drummer
- September 1 – Camile Velasco, Filipino-American singer
- September 4 – Sukrit Wisetkaew, Thai actor and singer
- September 17 – Jon Walker, American musician, singer, songwriter and record producer (Panic! at the Disco)
- September 18 – Megan Joy, American singer
- September 23 – Diana Ortiz, American singer (Dream)
- September 23 – Maki Goto, Japanese singer and actress (Morning Musume)
- September 24 – Paige Miles, American singer
- September 26 – M. Pokora, French pop, crunk, R&B singer and musician (Christina Millian)
- September 28 – Alina Ibragimova, Russian British violinist
- September 28 – Shindong, South Korean rapper (Super Junior)
- October 1 – Porcelain Black, American industrial indie pop singer-songwriter
- October 2 – Vogue Williams, Irish DJ, radio host, model and dancer
- October 4 – Shontelle, Barbadian singer and songwriter
- October 5 – Nicola Roberts, English recording artist, fashion designer and songwriter
- October 8
  - Bruno Mars, American singer-songwriter and dancer
  - Elliphant, Swedish singer-songwriter and rapper
- October 10 – Marina Diamandis, Welsh singer/songwriter
- October 18 – Andrew Garcia, American singer
- October 22 – Zac Hanson, American singer-songwriter (Hanson)
- October 23
  - Miguel, American singer-songwriter, producer
  - Lachlan Gillespie, Australian singer, musician, and actor
- October 25
  - Ciara, American singer, actress and dancer
  - Ayahi Takagaki, Japanese voice actress and singer
  - Vlad Topalov, Russian singer and dancer
- October 26 – Soko, French singer-songwriter, musician and actress.
- October 28
  - Anthony Fantano, American online music critic and YouTuber (Cal Chuchesta)
  - Tina Guo, Chinese-American cellist and erhuist
  - Nomcebo Zikode, South African singer and songwriter
- October 29 – Ximena Sariñana, Mexican singer-songwriter and actress
- November 4 – Vanessa Struhler, German singer-songwriter
- November 5 – Kate DeAraugo, Australian singer-songwriter, Australian Idol 3 winner
- November 8 – Jack Osbourne, British media personality son of Ozzy Osbourne and Sharon Osbourne
- November 11
  - Jessica Sierra, American singer
  - Sanne Karlsson, Swedish singer (Play)
- November 14 – Louise Burns, Canadian rock singer and songwriter (Lillix)
- November 15 – Nick Fradiani, American singer
- November 19 – Ricki-Lee Coulter, New Zealand-born Australian singer-songwriter, Australian Idol contestant
- November 21
  - Carly Rae Jepsen, Canadian singer, songwriter and musician
  - Ruelle, American EDM pop singer/songwriter
- November 22 – Austin Brown, American producer, singer, songwriter and musician
- November 23 – Troy Ave, American rapper
- November 26
  - Lil' Fizz, American boy band (B2K)
  - Revalina S. Temat, Indonesian actress
- November 28 – Magdi Rúzsa, Hungarian singer
- November 30 – Hikari Mitsushima, Japanese actress, singer and model (Folder 5)
- December 1 – Janelle Monae, American recording artist, record producer, singer-songwriter, model, actor, businesswomen and activist
- December 3 – Amanda Seyfried, American singer, musical star, actor
- December 6 – Dulce María, Mexican singer
- December 10
  - Raven-Symoné, American actress and singer
  - Grace Chatto, English musician and singer, member of Clean Bandit
- December 12 – Erika Van Pelt, American singer
- December 17 – Jeremy McKinnon, American singer, record producer and songwriter (A Day to Remember)
- December 22 – Kae Tempest, English poet, spoken-word artist, rapper and playwright
- December 23
  - Arcángel, American rapper, singer and songwriter
  - Dev Hynes, British singer, songwriter, composer, producer and author
- December 23 – Harry Judd, British pop drummer (McFly)
- December 29 – Alexa Ray Joel, American singer-songwriter and pianist

== Deaths ==
- January 3 – Lucien Cailliet, clarinetist, conductor, arranger and composer, 87
- January 4 – Lovro von Matačić, Croatian conductor, 85
- January 10 – Anton Karas, Austrian zither player and composer, 78
- January 25 – Paul Smith, American film and television composer, 78
- January 30 – Ivar Haglund, folk singer and restaurateur, 79 (heart attack)
- February 7 – Matt Monro, English singer, 54 (liver cancer)
- February 11 – Heinz Eric Roemheld, American composer, 83
- February 12 – Leslie Sarony, English singer, comedian and songwriter, 87
- February 18
  - Willy Alberti, Dutch singer, 58 (liver cancer)
  - Gábor Darvas, composer and musicologist, 74
- February 22 – Delores Marie "D'Marie" Warren, founding member of Alton McClain & Destiny, 32 (car crash)
  - Efrem Zimbalist, violinist, 94
- February 28 – David Byron, vocalist of Uriah Heep, 38 (alcohol-related)
- March 1 – Eugene List, American classical pianist, 66
- March 15 – Alan A. Freeman, English record producer, 64
- March 16 – Roger Sessions, American composer, 88
- March 23 – Zoot Sims, jazz saxophonist, 59
- March 31 – Jeanine Deckers, known as The Singing Nun, 51 (suicide)
- May 2
  - Bridget D'Oyly Carte, opera impresario, 77
  - Leonard Falcone, baritone/euphonium virtuosos and director of bands at Michigan State, 86
- May 8 – Karl Marx, composer and conductor, 87
- May 12 – Rodolfo Arizaga, Argentinian composer
- May 19 – Hilding Rosenberg, composer, 92
- July 23 – Kay Kyser, US bandleader, 80
- July 30 – Peter Knight, conductor, arranger and composer, 68
- August 11 – Nick Ceroli, jazz drummer, 45
- August 12 – Kyu Sakamoto, Japanese singer, 43 (plane crash)
- August 13 – Jimmy Stokley (Exile), American singer, 41
- August 24 – Paul Creston, American composer, 78
- September 6 – Little Brother Montgomery, jazz and blues pianist and singer, 79
- September 8 – Frederick May, Irish composer, 74
- September 11 – William Alwyn, English composer, 79
- September 13 – Winifred Cecil, American operatic soprano, 78
- September 18 – Ed Lewis, jazz trumpeter, 76
- September 19 – Rockdrigo González, folk & rock singer-songwriter, 34 (1985 Mexico City earthquake)
- October 6
  - Lola Gjoka, Albanian pianist, 75
  - Nelson Riddle, American conductor, composer and arranger, 64
- October 11 – Tex Williams, American country singer, 68
- October 12 – Ricky Wilson, American guitarist (The B-52's), 32 (AIDS Related)
- October 14 – Emil Gilels, Soviet pianist, 68
- October 18 – Stefan Askenase, Polish-born Belgian pianist, 94
- October 20 – Boris Lisanevich, dancer, 80
- October 22 – Viorica Ursuleac, Romanian operatic soprano, 91
- November 15 – Seán Ryan, Irish fiddler and whistler
- November 18 – Stephan Henrik Barratt-Due, Norwegian violinist and music teacher, 66
- November 24 – Big Joe Turner, blues singer, 74
- December 12 – Ian Stewart (The Rolling Stones), 42 (heart attack)
- December 22 – D. Boon, lead singer of Minutemen, 27 (car accident)
- December 30 – Bob Pearson, pianist and singer (Bob and Alf Pearson), 78
- December 31 – Ricky Nelson, singer, former teen idol, 45 (plane crash)

== Awards ==
- Eurovision Song Contest 1985
- 27th Annual Grammy Awards
- 1985 Country Music Association Awards
- 27th Japan Record Awards

== Charts ==
- List of Billboard Hot 100 number ones of 1985
- 1985 in British music#Charts
- List of Oricon number-one singles of 1985

== See also ==
- Record labels established in 1985
