= List of number-one singles of 1985 (France) =

This is a list of the French SNEP Top 50 Singles number-ones of 1985.

== Summary ==
=== Singles chart ===
Week	Issue date	Artist	Single	Country
1	6 January	Peter and Sloane	"Besoin de rien, envie de toi"	France
2	13 January	Peter and Sloane	"Besoin de rien, envie de toi"	France
3	20 January	Ray Parker Jr	"Ghostbusters"	U.S.
4	27 January	Ray Parker Jr	"Ghostbusters"	U.S.
5	3 February	Pia Zadora and Jermaine Jackson	"When the Rain Begins to Fall"	U.S.
6	10 February	Pia Zadora and Jermaine Jackson	"When the Rain Begins to Fall"	U.S.
7	17 February	Ray Parker Jr	"Ghostbusters"	U.S.
8	24 February	Pia Zadora and Jermaine Jackson	"When the Rain Begins to Fall"	U.S.
9	3 March	Ray Parker Jr	"Ghostbusters"	U.S.
10	10 March	Al Corley	"Square Rooms"	U.S.
11	17 March	Al Corley	"Square Rooms"	U.S.
12	24 March	Al Corley	"Square Rooms"	U.S.
13	31 March	Jeanne Mas	"Johnny, Johnny"	France
14	7 April	Jeanne Mas	"Johnny, Johnny"	France
15	14 April	Al Corley	"Square Rooms"	U.S.
16	21 April	Jeanne Mas	"Johnny, Johnny"	France
17	28 April	Jeanne Mas	"Johnny, Johnny"	France
18	5 May	USA for Africa	"We Are the World"	U.S.
19	12 May	USA for Africa	"We Are the World"	U.S.
20	19 May	USA for Africa	"We Are the World"	U.S.
21	26 May	Chanteurs sans Frontières	"Éthiopie"	France
22	2 June	Chanteurs sans Frontières	"Éthiopie"	France
23	9 June	Chanteurs sans Frontières	"Éthiopie"	France
24	16 June	Chanteurs sans Frontières	"Éthiopie"	France
25	23 June	Chanteurs sans Frontières	"Éthiopie"	France
26	30 June	Chanteurs sans Frontières	"Éthiopie"	France
27	7 July	Chanteurs sans Frontières	"Éthiopie"	France
28	14 July	Chanteurs sans Frontières	"Éthiopie"	France
29	21 July	Opus	"Live Is Life"	Austria
30	28 July	Opus	"Live Is Life"	Austria
31	4 August	Opus	"Live Is Life"	Austria
32	11 August	Opus	"Live Is Life"	Austria
33	18 August	Opus	"Live Is Life"	Austria
34	25 August	Opus	"Live Is Life"	Austria
35	1 September	Opus	"Live Is Life"	Austria
36	8 September	Baltimora	"Tarzan Boy"	Italy
37	15 September	Baltimora	"Tarzan Boy"	Italy
38	22 September	Baltimora	"Tarzan Boy"	Italy
39	29 September	Baltimora	"Tarzan Boy"	Italy
40	6 October	Baltimora	"Tarzan Boy"	Italy
41	13 October	Century	"Lover Why"	France
42	20 October	Century	"Lover Why"	France
43	27 October	Century	"Lover Why"	France
44	3 November	Century	"Lover Why"	France
45	10 November	Century	"Lover Why"	France
46	17 November	Century	"Lover Why"	France
47	24 November	Century	"Lover Why"	France
48	1 December	Jean-Jacques Goldman and Michael Jones	"Je te donne"	France
49	8 December	Jean-Jacques Goldman and Michael Jones	"Je te donne"	France
50	15 December	Jean-Jacques Goldman and Michael Jones	"Je te donne"	France
51	22 December	Jean-Jacques Goldman and Michael Jones	"Je te donne"	France
52	29 December	Jean-Jacques Goldman and Michael Jones	"Je te donne"	France

== See also ==
- 1985 in music
- List of number-one hits (France)
- List of artists who reached number one on the French Singles Chart
