= Tom Stern =

Tom Stern may refer to:

- Tom Stern (filmmaker) (born 1965), film and television writer and director
- Tom Stern (cinematographer) (born 1946), American cinematographer
- Tom Stern (actor) (died 2024), actor and husband of Samantha Eggar
