= Bigger Than the Sky =

- Movie poster
- Directed by: Al Corley
- Written by: Rodney Patrick Vaccaro
- Produced by: Craig Borden
- Starring: Marcus Thomas; John Corbett; Amy Smart; Sean Astin; Clare Higgins; Patty Duke
- Cinematography: Carl Nilsson
- Edited by: Axel Hubert
- Music by: Rob Cairns
- Production companies: Coquette Productions; Neverland Films
- Distributed by: MGM Distribution Co.
- Release date: February 18, 2005 (limited)
- Running time: 106 minutes
- Country: United States
- Language: English
- Budget: $750,000
- Box office: $21,398

Bigger Than the Sky is a 2005 American drama film directed by Al Corley, written by Rodney Patrick Vaccaro, and starring Marcus Thomas, John Corbett, Amy Smart, Sean Astin, Clare Higgins, and Patty Duke. Its plot follows a man, who after breaking up with his girlfriend, auditions for a local community theatre production of Cyrano de Bergerac.

== Plot ==
After being rejected by his girlfriend, Peter Rooker, an art-department employee in Portland, Oregon, decides to audition for a small role in an upcoming local community theatre's production of Cyrano de Bergerac. Despite the fact that Peter has no experience or skill as an actor, the director casts Peter as Cyrano, the lead character. Peter soon becomes caught up in the various intrigues of the "theater people", including the charming but mercurial Michael Degan, the beautiful leading lady Grace Hargrove, and a cast of other eccentric players. Gradually, Peter discovers that in the world of theater, the normal rules do not apply, but in the end, everyone has a role. As Peter struggles with his acting, clearly he is not going to be ready for opening night.

An experienced, but universally disliked actor, Ken Zorbell, is brought in to play Cyrano. Realizing the writing is on the wall, Peter asks the director to let him relinquish the role and take another role as a background character. On opening night, the lead has not appeared, and the director asks Peter, who has never rehearsed the role, to play Cyrano. At first, he declines, but then realizing it is his dream, he plays Cyrano with great success.

== Cast ==
- Marcus Thomas as Peter Rooker / Cyrano
- John Corbett as Michael Degan / Christian
- Amy Smart as Grace Hargrove / Roxanne
- Sean Astin as Ken Zorbell
- Clare Higgins as Edwina Walters
- Patty Duke as Mrs. Keene / Earlene
- Allan Corduner as Kippy Newberg
- J.W. Crawford as Kirk
- Victor Morris as Steve
- Brian Urspringer as Scott
- Kenny Jones as Ted (as Kenneth Jones)
- Orianna Herrman as Susan
- Pam Mahon as Julie
- Ernie Garrett as Paul Fisher
- Matt Salinger as Mal Gunn
- Nurmi Husa as David Nicolette
- Greg Germann as Roger
- Shea Curry as Mary Anne
- Nicholas Forbes as Andrew
- Michael Teufel as Male Sewer
- Michael Mendelson as Actor
- Al Corley as Guy in Line

== Production ==
The film was shot on location in Portland, Oregon.

== Release ==
The film received a limited release on February 18, 2005, opening in New York City; Los Angeles; Atlanta; Portland, Oregon; Austin, Texas; and Minneapolis.

== Critical response ==
Writing for The Village Voice, Ed Park noted that the film "lopes along endlessly, a no-surprises foray into backstage high-jinks and the notion of life as the best acting coach there is." Anita Gates of The New York Times wrote: "The surprising thing about Bigger Than the Sky is its touching ending. A colleague has died, and the company gathers to honor him in an inventive, life-affirming way. Finally, it becomes clear that Mr. Corley's film is meant to be a tribute to the love of theater. It has just been posing as the story of one man's finding himself." Marc Savlov of The Austin Chronicle awarded the film only a half star out of five, writing: "Bigger Than the Sky feels constrained by its unshakable predisposition toward actorly fawning. This film is so enamored of theatre folk and their lusty lot that you want to slap it about the face and neck and force it to go endure the inevitable hip-hop take on Beckett's existential yawn."
