= Marcus Thomas (actor) =

Belgian-born American actor

- Occupation: Actor
- Website: www.marcusthomas.net

Marcus Thomas is a Belgian-born American actor. He studied international relations and art at Occidental College.

== Filmography ==
Year	Title	Role
1998	Palmetto	Courtroom photographer
2000	Drowning Mona	Jeff Dearly
2000	Gripsholm	Karlchen
2001	Cowboy Up	Ely Braxton
2003	Scorched	Carter Doleman
2004	Noel	Jules Calvert
2005	Bigger Than the Sky	Peter Rooker/Cyrano
2005	Edmond	Window man
2006	The Gravedancers	Sid Vance
2007	You Kill Me	Stef Krzeminski
2009	Stolen	Pete Dunne
2010	Subject 15	
2011	Kill the Irishman	William "Billy" McComber
2021	The Ice Road	Gurty McCann
2025	Ice Road: Vengeance	Gurty McCann
