= The Fruit Machine (1988 film) =

1988 film by Philip Saville

- Theatrical release poster
- Directed by: Philip Saville
- Written by: Frank Clarke
- Produced by: Steve Morrison
- Starring: Emile Charles; Tony Forsyth; Robert Stephens; Robbie Coltrane; Bruce Payne
- Cinematography: Dick Pope
- Edited by: Richard Bedford
- Music by: Hans Zimmer
- Distributed by: Vestron Pictures
- Release date: 17 August 1988 (Australia)
- Running time: 103 minutes
- Country: United Kingdom
- Language: English

The Fruit Machine (known as Wonderland in the United States) is a 1988 British film thriller starring Tony Forsyth, Emile Charles, Bruce Payne and Robbie Coltrane in the role of "Annabelle." The film, which was directed by BAFTA-winner Philip Saville, is about two gay teen friends who are running from an underworld assassin and the police. It was produced by UK TV company Granada Productions. The film showcases the rising careers of actors Coltrane and Payne, as well as a future Academy Award winner, composer Hans Zimmer, who wrote the soundtrack.

The film uses a combination of adventure, buddy film, road movie and 1980s filmmaking to address a number of social issues that were pertinent to the times. Since its release, it has developed a cult following primarily due to its straightforward portrayal of British gay youth.

== Plot ==
Eddie and Michael are two 16-year-old best friends on the brink of adulthood. They are both gay, but hold diametrically opposed outlooks on life. Eddie likes watching old films on video with his mother. Michael likes video games and the street. They are total opposites that argue like an old married couple. Leaving behind the grim, oppressive reality of Liverpool (in the 1980s unemployment rates in Liverpool were amongst the highest in the UK), they stumble into the bizarre fantasy world of a gay transvestite nightclub called The Fruit Machine, run by "Annabelle". There, they witness a brutal gangland murder by Echo that transforms their thirst for adventure into a run for their lives. Alone and afraid, yet hopeful, they wind up in Brighton with Vincent and Eve at Wonderland, where their path is strewn with manipulation, deceit and murder.

== Cast ==
- Emile Charles - Eddie
- Tony Forsyth - Michael
- Robert Stephens - Vincent
- Robbie Coltrane - "Annabelle"
- Clare Higgins - Eve
- Bruce Payne - Echo
- Carsten Norgaard - Dolphin Man
- Kim Christie - Jean
- Louis Emerick - Billy
- Julie Graham - Hazel
- Forbes Collins - John Schlesinger

== Production ==
=== Writing ===
The film's screenwriter, Frank Clarke said "Echo the murderer signifies HIV/AIDS, and the dolphinarium is the sanctuary from it'.

=== Casting ===
The younger brother of actor Craig Charles, Emile Charles plays the role of Eddie.

=== Filming ===
The film was shot on location in Liverpool, Brighton and London. Filming began in October 1987. Included were interior and main entrance scenes at the Britannia Adelphi Hotel, Liverpool. Flamingo Land in Kirby Misperton, North Yorkshire was used for the fun park known as Wonderland.

=== Music ===
The soundtrack was written by then newcomer Hans Zimmer. A soundtrack has never officially been released; however a 20-minute piece entitled The Fruit Machine Suite appears on the album HANS ZIMMER: The British Years, a sampling of the composer's earlier film work.

The disco dance sequence used music from both Divine, a drag queen who had released several singles in the UK charts in the 1980s, and Man 2 Man, using their hit "Male Stripper". The film's title song was produced by Stock, Aitken & Waterman and sung by Paul Lekakis.

== Home media ==
The film has had two DVD releases. In the UK on 16 July 2007 and on 9 April 2009, the German-based Pro-Fun Media released a region free digitally remastered edition in Anamorphic widescreen (1.66:1), including booklet and trailer. A North American Region 1 DVD version never materialised, only the original Vestron VHS and laserdisc titled Wonderland, released in 1989.

== Reception ==
A reviewer for London's Time Out magazine stated that 'Saville films Frank Clarke's script in a mishmash of styles, and the pace sometimes flags' but nonetheless that 'it's as camp as Christmas, and if it rarely hits the jackpot, playing along with it is wildly enjoyable'. Another reviewer stated that the film is 'a hotch-potch of ideas woven together - making a mountainous and chronically unbelievable mess'. David Hall stated that the film 'is a bit of a mix' but that 'the parts that shine however are quite beautiful, as too is the lush score by noted composer Hans Zimmer'. A reviewer for Screen International stated that the film 'is so bursting with ideas and operates on so many levels, that some of them are inevitably unsatisfying'. A reviewer for Variety stated that 'hesitating between love story and thriller, satire and ecological militancy, the film wavers in between and never fully commits itself'. David Kehr stated that 'Saville's choices are consistently shameless, the film finally insufferable'. Hal Hinson complained that elements of the film did not add up and that writer Clarke took an 'overprecious view of Eddie's sexuality'.
