= Cowboy Up =

2001 film by Xavier Koller

- Release poster
- Directed by: Xavier Koller
- Written by: James Redford
- Produced by: Al Corley; Eugene Musso; Bart Rosenblatt
- Starring: Kiefer Sutherland; Marcus Thomas; Daryl Hannah; Molly Ringwald; Melinda Dillon
- Cinematography: Andrew Dintenfass
- Edited by: Anthony Sherin
- Music by: Daniel Licht
- Distributed by: Destination Films
- Release date: July 11, 2001
- Running time: 105 minutes
- Country: United States
- Language: English

Cowboy Up (also known as Ring of Fire) is a 2001 American Western film directed by Xavier Koller. It stars Kiefer Sutherland, Marcus Thomas, Molly Ringwald, and Daryl Hannah. It won the Crystal Heart Award at the 2001 Heartland Film Festival.

== Plot ==
Rising bull riding star Ely Braxton (Marcus Thomas) is recovering from injuries that almost took his life. Against the wishes of his mother Rose Braxton (Melinda Dillon) and girlfriend Connie (Molly Ringwald), Ely starts riding bulls again to achieve his dream of becoming a champion bull rider like his estranged father, Reid Braxton (Pete Postlethwaite). Ely's older brother, Hank (Kiefer Sutherland), is a bull rider-turned-bullfighter and stock contractor, and the two use each other to better their skills and work together at their family ranch in Santa Maria, California. As Ely's career becomes highly successful, he starts a relationship with Celia Jones (Daryl Hannah), who is a barrel racer and Hank's love interest. Hank is consumed with anger and jealousy at Ely's betrayal and the brothers become estranged.

At the Professional Bull Riders (PBR) World Finals in Las Vegas, Nevada, Ely, having ended his relationship with Celia, draws Hank's unridden and greatly feared bull Zapata and asks for Hank's help. Hank tells Ely to let go of the past memories he has been carrying around his entire life, and gives Ely the address of their father's house in Las Vegas. Ely meets his father, but Reid does not recognize Ely and thinks he is a rodeo reporter, but Ely says he is just a bull rider. Ely realizes his father is not the hero he has idolized.

During the PBR World Finals' championship round, Ely successfully rides Zapata, but is injured. In the process, Hank rushes to save Ely from Zapata, but is killed when Zapata crushes his chest. When the Braxton ranch hand and family friend Joe (Russell Means) brings Zapata back to the Braxton ranch, Rose grabs a shotgun and almost shoots Zapata in her grief over Hank's death, but Joe and Ely talk her down. They say they will shoot Zapata, but Ely remembers Hank's pride in the bull and shoots into the air as Zapata calmly walks into the pasture. Joe tells Ely that Hank would have also let Zapata go instead of killing him. Ely agrees and the two return to the ranch.

== Cast ==
- Kiefer Sutherland as Hank Braxton
- Marcus Thomas as Ely Braxton
- Daryl Hannah as Celia Jones
- Molly Ringwald as Connie
- Melinda Dillon as Rose Braxton
- Russell Means as Joe
- Anthony Lucero as Jed
- Bo Hopkins as Ray Drupp
- Pete Postlethwaite as Reid Braxton
- Donnie Gay as Himself
- Pam Minick as Herself

== Production ==
The film was shot in 1998. The climax was filmed at that year's PBR World Finals in Las Vegas, Nevada, and featured real-life PBR bull riders, bulls, and bullfighters of the time in action. Kiefer Sutherland and Daryl Hannah previously co-starred in The Last Days of Frankie the Fly (1997).

Parts of the film were also shot at the Santa Maria Fairpark, home of the Santa Barbara County Fair, and in surrounding communities.
