= ...And Soul It Goes =

Studio album by Century
- Released: April 29, 1986
- Recorded: 1985–1986
- Studio: Jet Studio
- Genre: Rock
- Label: Clever
- Producer: Jean-Louis Milford

Century chronology
...And Soul It Goes (1986)	Is It Red? (1988)

And... Soul It Goes is the debut album by French rock band Century, released in 1986 by the label Clever. The song "Lover Why" reached number one on France's music charts for seven weeks. In Brazil, the song was featured in the soundtrack for the soap opera Ti Ti Ti, as the theme for the characters Gaby and Pedro. The single "Jane" reached the #35 position in France.

The other singles "Gone with the Winner" and "Self Destruction" did not enter any musical charts, but "Gone with the Winner" was used in the soundtrack for another soap opera, Hipertensão.

== Track listing ==
- All songs written by Jean-Louis Milford and Paul Ives, except track 2 (John Weysley, Milford, Ives)

No.	Title	Length
1.	"Pay as You Hurt"	5:43
2.	"Lover Why"	5:59
3.	"Nigel Understands"	6:15
4.	"(On A) Landslide"	7:23
5.	"Jane"	4:21
6.	"The Day the Water Dried"	4:13
7.	"Gone with the Winner"	4:27
8.	"Self Destruction"	5:25
9.	"Fly Me to the Ground"	5:46
