= Ice Road: Vengeance =

2025 film by Jonathan Hensleigh

- Theatrical release poster
- Directed by: Jonathan Hensleigh
- Written by: Jonathan Hensleigh
- Produced by: Lee Nelson; David Tish; Eugene Musso; Shivani Rawat; Julie Goldstein; Al Corley; Bart Rosenblatt; Jonathan Hensleigh
- Starring: Liam Neeson; Fan Bingbing; Marcus Thomas; Bernard Curry; Salim Fayad; Geoff Morrell
- Cinematography: Tom Stern
- Edited by: Luke Doolan
- Music by: Michael Yezerski
- Production companies: CODE Entertainment; ShivHans Pictures; Envision Media Arts
- Distributed by: Vertical
- Release date: June 27, 2025
- Running time: 114 minutes
- Country: United States
- Language: English

Ice Road: Vengeance is a 2025 American action thriller film written and directed by Jonathan Hensleigh. It is the direct sequel to The Ice Road (2021). Liam Neeson and Marcus Thomas return from the first film, alongside Fan Bingbing, Bernard Curry, Salim Fayad and Geoff Morrell. The film follows an ice-road truck driver who travels to the Himalayas to scatter his brother's ashes where he must fend off mercenaries.

The film was released in the United States in selected theaters on June 27, 2025, and received negative reviews from critics.

== Plot ==
Mike McCann, a seasoned ice-road trucker, is grappling with survivor's guilt following the death of his younger brother, Gurty, who perished in the events of The Ice Road. To honor Gurty's final wish, Mike travels to Nepal to scatter his ashes atop Mount Everest.

In Kodari, local opposition figure Ganesh Rai opposes the construction of a hydroelectric dam that would affect the access of water supply from the river, which is proposed by corrupt industrialist Rudra Yash. To remove the opposition, a mercenary, hired by Rudra, kills Ganesh's father by pushing his bus off the cliff, making it look like an accident. Upon learning this, Ganesh's son, Vijay, realizes that his father will be next and hides him in the isolated cabin in the Annapurna Highlands.

Arriving in Kathmandu, Mike hires Dhani, a skilled local Everest guide. They join a group of passengers aboard the "Kiwi Express", a tour bus navigating the perilous "Road to the Sky," a narrow, high-altitude mountain pass, and driven by spirited New Zealand bus driver, Spike. An American professor, Evan Myers, and his daughter Starr also board the bus.

As Vijay boards the bus, two mercenaries – Jeet and Yug – hijack the bus in attempt to kidnap Vijay. Mike punctures a tire through a hatch on the floor to force the bus to stop at Kodari and kills Yug while Dhani incapacitates and restrains Jeet. There, police officer Shankar arrives, purportedly to arrest Jeet and rescue Vijay. However, Shankar is actually Rudra's accomplice. Vijay is brought to a nearby building where Rudra tortures him for the whereabouts of his father. Realizing something is amiss, Mike, Dhani and Evan investigate the building. Rudra kills Evan but Mike and Dhani rescue Vijay before escaping on the repaired bus despite Mike and Spike being injured in the process.

Spike orders everyone to leave him on the side of the road, not wanting to die in his own bus, and Mike leaves an AK-47 under folder for him. Shortly, Spike shoots at Rudra's mercenaries' convoy and is killed. After traversing through the dangerous steep road and having their bus damaged and finally repaired, they arrive at the Annapurna Highlands where Vijay reunites with his father and Mike collapses from his injuries. Dhani treats Mike and kills another corrupt policeman who finds them.

The next day, Mike recovers and leaves the Highlands with the rest of the group. As the bus crosses a gorge by crane, Rudra and his men arrive and kill Ganesh, who was operating it to help the group escape. The mercenaries continue their pursuit and after crossing the China–Nepal border, Mike and the passengers kill Jeet and Shankar, and Rudra dies when Mike rams his car off the cliff with the bus.

Later, Vijay announces that the villagers will have both electricity and access to the river. Mike resumes his trip with Dhani and finally scatters his brother's ashes in the Himalayas. At the airport, after parting with Dhani, Mike spots a rope in a store display and remembers climbing with Gurty, who had said that life was for the living. Mike goes back outside to find Dhani, who stops her car and walks back towards Mike, smiling.

== Cast ==
- Liam Neeson as Mike McCann, an independent truck driver who travels to Nepal to scatter Gurty’s ashes
- Fan Bingbing as Dhani Yangchen, a local Mt. Everest guide
- Marcus Thomas as Gurty McCann
- Bernard Curry as Professor Myers
- Geoff Morrell as Spike, a New Zealand tourist bus driver
- Mahesh Jadu as Rudra Yash
- Amelia Bishop as Jeet, a French mercenary working for Rudra
- Salim Fayad as Jorgo
- Saksham Sharma as Vijay Rai
- Grace O'Sullivan as Starr Myers, Professor Myers daughter
- Monish Anand as Captain Shankar, a corrupt provincial Nepal police captain under the payroll of Rudra
- Shivantha Wijesinha as Lt. Mangal
- Rosie Traynor as Ranger Sam
- Seth Kannof as TSA Agent
- CJ. Bloomfield as Yug
- Luke Clayson as Paul
- Sahil Saluja as Corrupt Policeman
- Anna-Mai Hoek as V.A. Surgeon

== Production ==
In April 2023, it was announced a sequel titled The Ice Road 2: Road to the Sky would be produced with star Liam Neeson and writer/director Jonathan Hensleigh set to return. Principal photography began in January 2024 in Victoria, Australia with Bernard Curry, Geoff Morrell, and Grace O'Sullivan joining the cast. In February, Fan Bingbing joined the cast as the co-lead of the film.

The small town of Walhalla in Victoria served as the double for the Nepali location used in the film.

In June, it was reported that Vertical had acquired the distribution rights, and that the film had been retitled to Ice Road: Vengeance.

== Release ==
Ice Road: Vengeance was released in the United States in selected theaters on June 27, 2025, and was released on video on demand on July 1, 2025. The film was released on Netflix on September 15, 2025.

== Reception ==
On the review aggregator website Rotten Tomatoes, 16% of 25 critics' reviews are positive, with an average rating of 4.5/10. Metacritic, which uses a weighted average, assigned the film a score of 37 out of 100, based on 5 critics, indicating "generally unfavorable" reviews.
