= Tony Forsyth =

English actor

- Born: Liverpool, Merseyside, England
- Occupation: Actor

Tony Forsyth (born Liverpool, Merseyside) is a former English theatre and film actor of the 1980s-90s, noted for his troubled teen portrayals and scouse accent.

Forsyth is best known for his role playing rent-boy "Michael" in the 1988 British film The Fruit Machine, a/k/a Wonderland (USA). He first appeared on television in the BBC's John Lennon: A Journey in the Life and Channel 4's Brookside before being cast in The Fruit Machine, writer Frank Clarke's follow-up to Letter to Brezhnev.

Other film roles include Hard Days Hard Nights as Alan in a story loosely based on the Beatles trip to Hamburg before they hit the big time, The Tall Guy as Berkoff Actor and Derek Jarman's Edward II in which he played Captive Policeman. Other TV appearances include a guest spot in ITV's drama series Heartbeat as Ian Clayton and playing opposite Selina Cadell in Screenplay broadcast on BBC 2 in 1992.

Several other film roles were completed, along with a stage career.

== Career ==
Theatre:

- Sheffield Crucible Theatre
- Bolton Octagon Theatre

Billy Casper in Kes, Chiron in Titus Andronicus, Dave in Pocket Dream, The Moon in Blood Wedding, Malcolm in Macbeth, Young Scrooge/Ghost of Christmas Future in A Christmas Carol.

- Work in London:

John in Shelter, Neil in Boystalk (Royal National Studio).

- Tours:

Claudio in Much Ado About Nothing (Oxford Stage Company Tour to Malaysia and Japan).

- Royal Shakespeare Company:

Tsarina in A Patriot For Me.

In 1998, he played Red Rutter, "the Dribbler", of Todchester Rovers in "Shooting Stars" written by Basil Thomas at the Chester Gateway.

In 2000, national tour of "Naked Flame".

In 2002, played Jambo in "Naked Flame 2 – Fire Down Under!" in national tour.

Television:

- Journey in the Life of John Lennon
- Heartbeat
- Life and Works
- High Rise Low Life
- Brookside

== Recent activity ==
In recent years, TV appearances have been added to Forsyth's accomplishments and in 1999 spent time directing at the Greenwich Theatre in London. More recently, Forsyth has been working as a casting director.

== Select filmography ==
See the complete Tony Forsyth filmography at IMDB

Year	Title	Role
1988	The Fruit Machine	Michael
1989	Hard Days, Hard Nights	Alan
1989	The Tall Guy	Berkoff Actor
1991	Edward II	Captive Policeman
