= Ken Jones =

Ken or Kenneth Jones may refer to:

== Sports ==
- Ken Jones (rugby union, born 1921) (1921–2006), Welsh athlete and international rugby union footballer 1950s
- Ken Jones (rugby union, born 1941) (1941–2022), Wales international rugby union footballer who played in the 1960s
- Ken Jones (rugby league), Australian rugby league player
- Ken Jones (Welsh footballer, born 1936) (1936–2013), Welsh international football player (Cardiff City, Scunthorpe, Charlton Athletic)
- Ken Jones (English footballer, born 1936) (1936–2018), English footballer for Sunderland
- Ken Jones (footballer, born 1937), Welsh former footballer
- Ken Jones (footballer, born 1941), English football player (Southend United, Millwall, Colchester United)
- Ken Jones (footballer, born 1944) (1944–2012), English football player (Bradford PA, Southampton, Cardiff City)
- Ken Jones (American football) (born 1952), National Football League offensive lineman
- Ken Jones (baseball) (1903–1991), Major League Baseball pitcher
- Kenny Jones (basketball) (born 1984), American basketball player
- Ken Jones (Australian footballer) (born 1934), Australian rules footballer
- Kenwyne Jones (born 1984), Trinidadian football player

== Music ==
- Ken Jones (musician) (1927–1988), English film and television composer
- Kenney Jones (born 1948), English rock drummer
- Kenneth Jones (songwriter) (1952–1969), songwriter, son of Helen Carter, nephew of Johnny Cash
- Kennedy Jones (musician) (1900–1990), guitarist and music writer
- Kenneth V. Jones (1924–2020), British film and concert music composer

== Media ==
- Ken Jones (news reporter) (1938–1993), American television news reporter, actor, publisher
- Kennedy Jones (journalist) (1865–1921), British journalist, editor, newspaper manager, and member of parliament

== Others ==
- Ken Jones (Jamaican politician) (1924–1964), minister of communications and works
- Ken Jones (actor) (1930–2014), English actor
- Ken Jones (Buddhist) (1930–2015), Welsh Buddhist, author, poet, and activist
- Ken Jones (Canadian politician) (born 1939), Canadian politician
- Ken Jones (activist) (1950–2021), American LGBT rights activist
- Ken Jones (police officer), deputy commissioner of Victoria Police and president of ACPO
- Kenneth Norman Jones (1924–2022), Australian public servant
- Kenneth Wayne Jones (born 1966), American politician
- Sir Kenneth Jones (judge) (1921–2004), British barrister and judge
- Kenneth B. Jones (born 1930), member of the South Dakota Senate
- L. Ken Jones, chancellor of Lubbock Christian University, Lubbock, Texas
