= Shivani Rawat =

American film producer

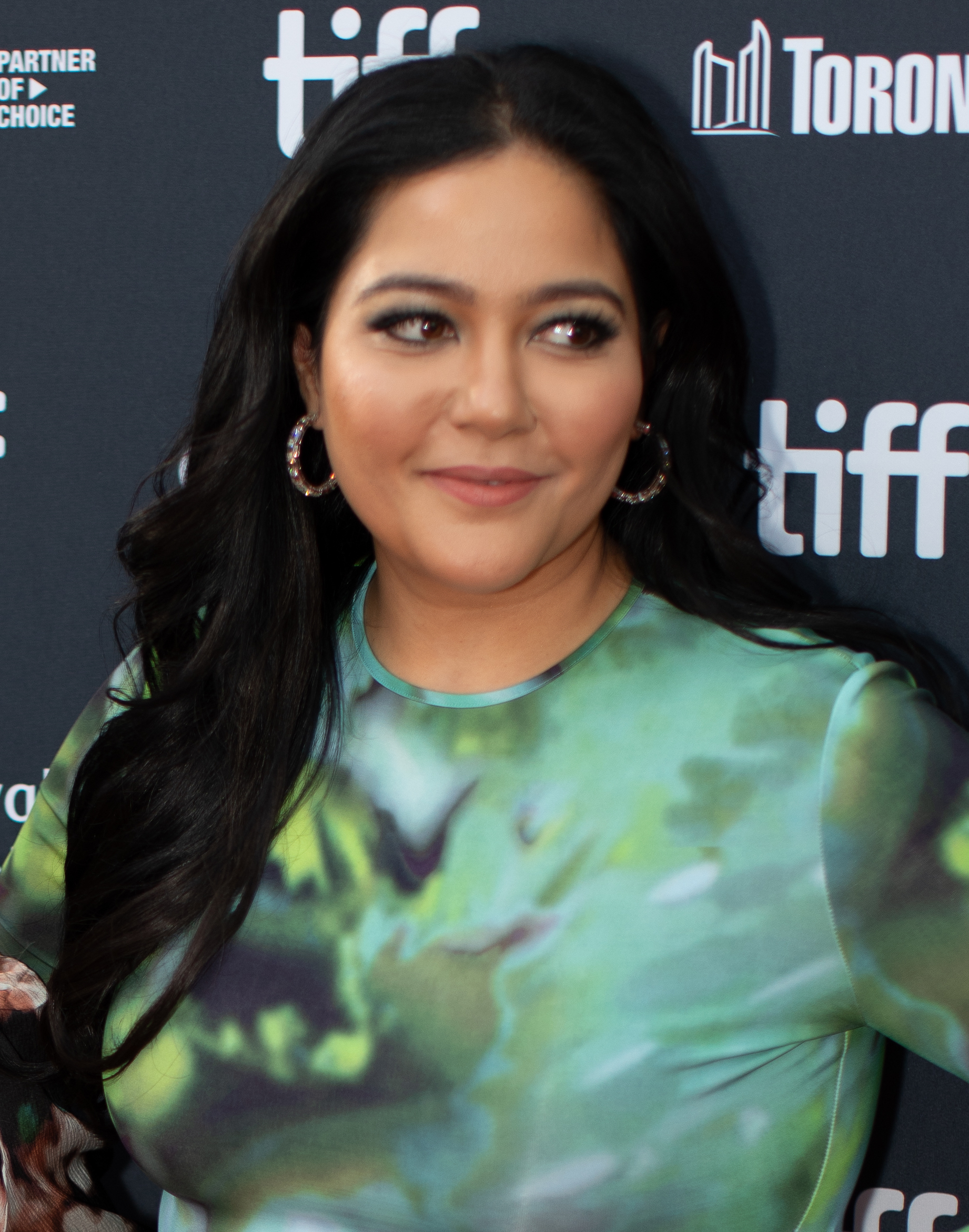
- Born: New Jersey, U.S.
- Education: Welham Girls' School; The New School; New York Film Academy
- Occupation: Film producer
- Known for: Trumbo (2015); Captain Fantastic (2016)

Shivani Rawat is a film producer based in New York known for producing independent films like Danny Collins (2015), Trumbo (2015), Captain Fantastic (2016), and Brian Banks (2018). She is the founder and CEO of ShivHans Pictures, a production company that supports feature films that do not fit into the Hollywood model. In May 2020, former head of Miramax and HBO Films, Julie Goldstein, joined ShivHans Pictures as Head of Production. Rawat was invited to join the Executives Branch of the Academy of Motion Picture Arts and Sciences in 2023.

Rawat is a board member for the Annenberg Inclusion Initiative at the USC Annenberg School for Communication and Journalism. In 2014, the American film distribution company Bleecker Street entered into an exclusive distribution deal with ShivHans Pictures, ensuring the US distribution for all its films.

Rawat attended Welham Girls' School in Dehradun, Uttarakhand, India, and is a graduate of The New School and New York Film Academy.

== Filmography ==
Year	Film	Notes
2013	Rajjo	Actress only; as Sakina
2015	Trumbo	Producer
2015	Danny Collins	Executive Producer
2016	Captain Fantastic	Producer
2018	The Polka King	Producer
2018	Hotel Mumbai (Uncredited)	Producer
2018	Brian Banks	Producer
2018	Beirut	Producer
2020	Wander Darkly	Producer
2020	The Water Man	Producer
2020	The Trial of the Chicago 7	Executive producer
2021	The Ice Road	Producer
2025	Ice Road: Vengeance	Producer
