= Hard Days, Hard Nights =

1989 film

- Directed by: Horst Königstein
- Written by: Peter Turner; Frank Göhre; Horst Königstein
- Starring: Al Corley; Mark Forrest; Nick Moran; Tony Forsyth; Paul Codman
- Cinematography: Klaus Brix
- Edited by: Hans Ströer
- Release date: 1989
- Country: West Germany
- Language: German (no subtitles)

Hard Days, Hard Nights (known as Beat Boys in West Germany) is a 1989 film directed by Horst Königstein an written by Frank Göhre, Horst Königstein, and Peter Turner. starring Al Corley, Mark Forrest, Nick Moran. the film was released on August 16, 1998.

== Plot ==
A British rock and roll band from Liverpool descends on Hamburg, c. 1960. They form romantic liaisons with several locals.

== Cast ==
- Al Corley as Chris
- Mark Forrest as John
- Nick Moran as Rick
- Tony Forsyth as Alan
- Paul Codman as Skid
- Rita Tushingham as Rita
- Wigald Boning as Kurt
- Christoph Eichhorn as Knies
- Ulrich Mühe as Flimmer
- Helmut Griem as Kronschneider
