= The Ice Road =

2021 American film by Jonathan Hensleigh

- Official promotional poster
- Directed by: Jonathan Hensleigh
- Written by: Jonathan Hensleigh
- Produced by: Lee Nelson; David Tish; Shivani Rawat; Al Corley; Bart Rosenblatt; Eugene Musso
- Starring: Liam Neeson; Benjamin Walker; Amber Midthunder; Marcus Thomas; Holt McCallany; Martin Sensmeier; Matt McCoy; Matt Salinger; Laurence Fishburne
- Cinematography: Tom Stern
- Edited by: Douglas Crise
- Music by: Max Aruj
- Production companies: Signature Entertainment; CODE Entertainment; ShivHans Pictures; Envision Media Arts
- Distributed by: Netflix
- Release date: June 25, 2021
- Running time: 109 minutes
- Country: United States
- Language: English
- Box office: $7.5 million

The Ice Road is a 2021 American action thriller film written and directed by Jonathan Hensleigh. The film stars Liam Neeson, Laurence Fishburne, Benjamin Walker, Amber Midthunder, Marcus Thomas, Holt McCallany, Martin Sensmeier, Matt McCoy, and Matt Salinger. The movie is influenced by 1953 film The Wages of Fear by Henri-Georges Clouzot who based his film on the novel of the same name written by Georges Arnaud.

The Ice Road follows a team of truck drivers on a dangerous mission over frozen lakes and winter roads to deliver a crucial component to save workers trapped in a collapsed diamond mine. The film was digitally released by Netflix in the United States and Canada on June 25, 2021, to mixed reviews from critics. A sequel, titled Ice Road: Vengeance, was released on June 27, 2025.

== Plot ==
An explosion at a mine in Manitoba traps 26 miners. Mike McCann and his brother Gurty, an Iraq War veteran suffering from PTSD and aphasia, work for a trucking company in North Dakota until Mike punches another trucker for making fun of Gurty's cognitive disability, and they are both fired. Mike hears about ice road truckers needed in Winnipeg, and they apply. Jim Goldenrod, another trucker, agrees to lead a rescue mission to deliver wellheads to the mine. He hires McCann and Gurty, along with a young Indigenous woman known only as Tantoo. Also joining the rescue mission is actuary Varnay, responsible for insurance risk assessment for Katka, the company which owns the mine. $200,000 is split between the four truckers, which will be redistributed among the survivors if anyone dies. Meanwhile, the miners are communicating with Katka executives using tap code, and Katka General Manager Sickle transmits a message that they plan to free the men by blasting a tunnel.

The team leaves for the mine with three wellheads. During the trip, Goldenrod's engine seizes. While attempting to repair it, the ice beneath his trailer breaks and his leg gets trapped. Knowing he can't escape, he convinces Tantoo to sever the strap attaching him to her truck, causing him to drown but saving the other two rigs and wellheads. In an attempt to flee the rapidly approaching pressure wave and cracking ice, the remaining two trucks fishtail and roll over, stopping the pressure wave.

Varnay convinces Mike to accuse Tantoo of sabotaging Goldenrod's rig, but Tantoo reveals her brother Cody is amongst the miners. When they continue to interrogate her, she pulls out a pistol, but Gurty disarms her and ties her up. After the men right the trucks, Varnay locks Mike and Gurty in the back of their rig. Varnay is revealed to have been the one who sabotaged Goldenrod's rig, and knocks Tantoo unconscious. He rigs Mike's truck with dynamite and drives off with Tantoo, but Mike and Gurty escape from the trailer and throw the dynamite away just before it explodes. Varnay watches the explosion from afar, believing that Mike and Gurty are dead.

While winching their trailer out of the ice, Gurty tries to warn Mike the winch will fail, but Mike starts the machine anyway. The winch snaps, causing Gurty and the trailer to fall into the water, but Mike rescues Gurty. Varnay meets with Sickle, telling him Mike and Gurty have died. Sickle instructs Varnay to get rid of Tantoo and the last remaining wellhead by making it seem Tantoo lost control and veered off a cliff. Varnay prepares to kill Tantoo, but is bitten by Gurty's pet rat Skeeter, enabling Tantoo to throw him out of the rig. Mike and Gurty arrive and kill the Katka contractors pursuing Tantoo.

After Tantoo runs out of fuel due to Varnay disconnecting her fuel equalizer, he catches up to her, but Mike crashes his rig into Varnay's truck, sending it off a cliff. Varnay survives and creates an avalanche with dynamite. Mike and Gurty escape, but Tantoo is hit by snow and wounded by a branch. They uncouple her trailer, and drive off with the wellhead. Varnay pursues them in Tantoo's rig and begins ramming them. Mike boards Varnay's rig and both fall from the truck. After a struggle, Mike attempts to drive away, but Varnay climbs onto the rig. Mike knocks Varnay out, accelerates the rig, and jumps out, causing it to fall through the surface and kill Varnay. Meanwhile, Tantoo and Gurty cross a bridge not designed for the weight of the truck, and barely make it over before the bridge collapses. After crossing, the truck starts sliding backwards, and Gurty is crushed trying to prevent the truck from falling. Mike arrives and comforts a dying Gurty. Mike and Tantoo arrive just in time to rescue the miners. After learning the truth, the Katka CEO fires Sickle, who is arrested for his actions.

Three months later, Tantoo is seen working in Goldenrod's garage as a mechanic. Mike visits her in his new gold truck, which he drives as an independent contractor to deliver sporting goods. As he drives off, he is seen tending to Skeeter and his license plate reads "TRK TRK TRK", in honor of Gurty's chosen name for a truck.

== Cast ==
- Liam Neeson as Mike McCann
- Laurence Fishburne as Jim Goldenrod
- Benjamin Walker as Tom Varnay
- Amber Midthunder as Tantoo
- Marcus Thomas as Gurty McCann
- Holt McCallany as René Lampard
- Martin Sensmeier as miner Cody
- Matt McCoy as general manager Sickle
- Matt Salinger as Gurty McCann

== Production ==
Filming occurred in Winnipeg in February 2020. Filming also occurred in Île-des-Chênes and Gimli, Manitoba.

== Music ==
The Ice Road: Music from and Inspired by the Netflix Film

Soundtrack album by various artists
- Released: June 25, 2021
- Genres: Rock, country, Americana
- Label: Big Machine

Singles from The Ice Road: Music from and Inspired by the Netflix Film
- 1. "I've Been Everywhere" Released: May 21, 2021; 2. "We Got Fight" Released: May 26, 2021

Hensleigh asked Big Machine Records to create a multi-genre soundtrack album for the film. Scott Borchetta, founder of the record label, wanted a psychobilly song as the basis for the soundtrack, and contacted Nikki Sixx to executively produce. As a result, Nikki Sixx formed supergroup L.A. Rats along with Rob Zombie, John 5 and Tommy Clufetos, and they released a cover version of "I've Been Everywhere" as a single on May 21, 2021. "We Got Fight", which was released on May 26, is Gary LeVox's debut solo single and plays over the film's end credits. The album also contains covers of songs by Johnny Cash, The Cars, Dave Dudley, Hank Snow, and Kathy Mattea.

The Ice Road: Music from and Inspired by the Netflix Film track listing
No.	Title	Artist	Length
1.	"All I Do Is Drive" (Johnny Cash cover)	Jason Isbell	2:50
2.	"Rubber Meets the Road"	Brantley Gilbert and Tyler Hubbard	2:34
3.	"Eighteen Wheels and a Dozen Roses" (Kathy Mattea cover)	Carly Pearce	3:12
4.	"I've Been Everywhere" (Hank Snow cover)	L.A. Rats	3:59
5.	"We Got Fight"	Gary LeVox	3:34
6.	"I'm Movin' On" (Hank Snow cover)	Miranda Lambert	3:11
7.	"Six Days on the Road" (Dave Dudley cover)	The Cadillac Three	2:50
8.	"Don't Come Lookin'"	Jackson Dean	3:07
9.	"Hurricane"	Luke Combs	3:43
10.	"Heart Made of Steel"	The Assassinzs featuring John Carter Cash and Robin Zander	4:35
11.	"All Coming Down"	Mark Collie and Allison Moorer	3:13
12.	"Drive" (The Cars cover)	Tim McGraw	3:58

== Release ==
In March 2021, Netflix acquired the U.S. distribution rights to the film for $18 million, and it was digitally released on the service on June 25, 2021. It was the most-streamed film on the service in its debut weekend. It was released by Amazon Prime Video in the United Kingdom.

== Reception ==
On review aggregator website Rotten Tomatoes, the film holds an approval rating of 44% based on 89 reviews, with an average rating of 4.8/10. The website's critical consensus reads, "Liam Neeson remains a top-tier action hero; unfortunately, like a number of his recent genre outings, The Ice Road is a downhill trundle paved with predictability." On Metacritic, the film has a weighted average score of 42 out of 100 based on 24 critics, indicating "mixed or average" reviews.

Alonso Duralde of the TheWrap criticized the "downright laughable VFX" and wrote: "The Ice Road is so often inept and heavy-handed that not even the reliable presence of Liam Neeson can rescue it."

== Sequel ==
In April 2023, it was announced a sequel titled The Ice Road 2: Road to the Sky would be produced with star Liam Neeson and writer/director Jonathan Hensleigh set to return. The sequel will follow Mike McCann who honors his late brother's last wish by traveling to Nepal to scatter his ashes on Mt. Everest. While on a tour bus traversing the deadly 12,000 ft. terrain of the infamous Road to the Sky, Mike and his mountain guide encounter a group of Nepalese mercenaries and must fight not only to save themselves and the busload of innocent travelers, but also the local villagers’ homeland. The following month, it was announced that Amazon Prime Video was slated to pre-buy international rights (with the exception of Germany) for $17 million. In June 2025, it was reported that the film had been retitled to Ice Road: Vengeance. The sequel was released on June 27, 2025.
