= Come Back to Me (album) =

Studio album by Peter One
- Released: May 5, 2023
- Recorded: 2022
- Studio: Creative Workshop (Berry Hill, Tennessee); The Henhouse (Nashville, Tennessee); Phillips Recording (Memphis, Tennessee)
- Genre: Folk music
- Length: 41:21
- Language: English, French, Guro
- Label: Verve Forecast
- Producer: Rafaela Hernández; Peter One; Matt Ross-Spang

Peter One chronology
Spirit in 9 (1987)	Come Back to Me (2023)

“Music to me is a way to bring people together, to heal and to tell stories. I feel so lucky to be able to sing my song to the whole world from the stage of this great land of the United States of America.”

—One on the eve of debuting his new music at the Grand Ole Opry

Come Back to Me is the first solo album by Ivorian folk musician Peter One, released in 2023. The follow-up to his collaborative works with Jess Sah Bi Our Garden Needs Its Flowers (1985) and Spirit in 9 (1987), this album renewed interest in One's career after several years in obscurity and received positive reviews from critics. Come Back to Me was released by Verve Forecast after a re-release of Our Garden Needs Its Flowers, allowing One to tell personal stories from his period after his 1980s fame.

== Reception ==
Editors at AllMusic rated this album 4 out of 5 stars, with critic Timothy Monger writing it "is a lovely album that distills One's still-vibrant Ivorian roots into an intriguing hybrid of acoustic Afro-pop and American folk". The site included this on their list of favorite folk and Americana albums of 2023, as well as their list of Latin and global music albums. Editors at Rolling Stone included this among the best country and Americana albums of 2023.

== Track listing ==
All songs written by Peter One, except where noted.

1. "Cherie Vico" – 5:16
2. "Kavudu" – 4:04
3. "Ejie" – 4:36
4. "Staring into the Blues" (Patrick Orr) – 3:42
5. "Sweet Rainbow" – 4:06
6. "On My Own" – 3:38
7. "La Petite" – 3:51
8. "Joue-Moi Le Piano" – 3:57
9. "Bonne Année" – 3:57
10. "Birds Go Die Out of Sight" – 4:17

== Personnel ==
- Peter One – acoustic guitar, electric guitar, percussion, whistle, vocals, engineering, production
- Brian Allen – bass guitar
- Jess Sah Bi – vocals on "Bonne Année"
- Ken Coomer – drums, finger snaps, percussion
- Steve Dawson – engineering
- Ryan Hartley – photography
- Rafaela Hernández – production
- John Németh – harmonica on "Staring into the Blues" and "Birds Go Die Out of Sight"
- Paul Niehaus – pedal steel guitar on "Ejie", "Sweet Rainbow", "Bonne Année", and "Birds Go Die Out of Sight"
- Femi Onafowokan – administration
- Patrick Orr – electric guitar on "Staring into the Blues"
- Kim Rosen – mastering at Ring Mastering, Ringwood, New Jersey, United States
- Matt Ross-Spang – engineering, mixing, production
- Allison Russell – vocals on "Birds Go Die Out of Sight"
- Pat Sansone – acoustic guitar, electric guitar, tenor guitar, Mellotron, piano, electric piano, Wurlitzer, vibraphone, finger snaps
- Jim Spake – saxophone on "Staring into the Blues" and "Joue-Moi Le Piano"
- Joe Spix – art direction, design

== See also ==
- List of 2023 albums
