= Jane (Century song) =

Single by Century

from the album ...And Soul It Goes
- Released: 1986
- Recorded: 1986
- Genre: Rock
- Length: 4:26
- Label: Carrere
- Songwriters: Jean-Louis Milford; Paul Ives

Century singles chronology
"Lover Why" (1985)	"Jane" (1986)	"Gone with the Winner" (1986)

"Jane" is the second single by French rock band Century, released in 1986 from their debut album ...And Soul It Goes. The song did not achieve the same success as their previous single "Lover Why", but managed to enter the French music charts, remaining in the top 40 for thirteen weeks.

== Track listings ==
7" single

No.	Title	Length
1.	"Jane"	4:26
2.	"Help Me Help"	3:30

12" single

No.	Title	Length
1.	"Jane" (Long Version)	6:02
2.	"Help Me Help"	3:20

Portugal 7" single

No.	Title	Length
1.	"Jane"	4:21
2.	"Self Destruction"	5:25

== Charts ==
Chart	Peak position
France (SNEP)	35
