= Our Garden Needs Its Flowers =

- Cover to the 2018 re-release

Studio album by Jess Sah Bi and Peter One
- Released: 1985
- Recorded: 1985
- Studio: JBZ Recording Studio, Abidjan, Côte d'Ivoire
- Genre: Folk music
- Length: 30:29
- Language: English, French, Guro
- Label: Dedjay Broadcasting System
- Producer: Etienne Theo

Jess Sah Bi and Peter One chronology
Our Garden Needs Its Flowers (1985)	Spirit in 9 (1987)

“It was an eight-track studio. At that time it was one of the best ones in Abidjan. Compared to what we could find in Europe and other big countries, it was really average. The musicians, all of them are African and most of them Ivorian, from the Ivory Coast, and one from Cameroon, the bass player. The musicians got the feeling very quickly.”

—Peter One on the recording process for Our Garden Needs Its Flowers

Our Garden Needs Its Flowers is the debut album by Ivorian folk musicians Jess Sah Bi and Peter One, released in 1985. After some success in Côte d'Ivoire, One moved to America to capitalize on this, but struggled to make a career until a 2018 re-release of this album led to his follow-up, Come Back to Me in 2023. The album has received positive reviews.

== Recording and release ==
Our Garden Needs Its Flowers was initially released in 1985 and stood out among West African popular music, which focused on reggae and rhythm and blues, whereas these recordings blended local folk music along with American and English influences, such as country music styles and English-language lyrics. Jess Sah Bi and Peter One became a popular performing duo and toured the region until they broke up in 1990. One subsequently moved to the United States, but had a difficult time establishing a solo career and Bi followed shortly thereafter. Reissue label Awesome Tapes from Africa reissued the album on music streaming platforms as well as with physical releases on August 17, 2018, garnering renewed attention to the duo and leading One to record a follow-up a few years later.

== Reception ==
In a review of Come Back to Me, Timothy Monger of AllMusic called this release "heartfelt album of Ivorian folk music that took influence from American acts like Simon & Garfunkel and Crosby, Stills & Nash". At Bandcamp, this was chosen for Album of the Day on August 8, 2018, with critic Dean Van Nguyen for blending multiple languages, musical genres, and influences into a unique album and wrote that the re-release is "a giant step toward gaining the band some of the recognition worldwide that West African fans always knew they deserved". Writing for Pitchfork Media, Madison Bloom rated this album a 7.7 out of 10, calling it "a joyful vision of a world without borders" and praised the duo's vocal harmonies.

== Track listing ==
All songs composed by Die Sah Bi and Pierre-Evrard Tra

1. "Clipo Clipo" – 3:47
2. "Katin" – 3:37
3. "Kango" – 2:43
4. "Minmanle?" – 4:08
5. "Our Garden Needs Its Flowers" – 4:53
6. "Apartheid" – 4:19
7. "African Chant" – 3:19
8. "Solution" – 3:43

== Personnel ==
- Jess Sah Bi – guitar, vocals
- Peter One – guitar, vocals
- Pamphille De Souza – engineering
- Hugh N’guessan Santa – guitar, arrangement
- Martyn Pepperell – liner notes, production assistance
- Etienne Theo – production
- Jessica Thompson – audio extraction, remastering
- Emile Valognes – engineering
- Unnamed session musicians – instrumentation

== See also ==
- List of 1985 albums
