= Tom Stern (cinematographer) =

American cinematographer

- Born: Thomas Evans Stern; December 16, 1946 (age 79); Palo Alto, California, U.S.
- Years active: 1974–present

Thomas Evans Stern, ASC, AFC (born December 16, 1946) is an American cinematographer.

He is best known for his collaboration with director Clint Eastwood from 2002 to 2018, which his work on Changeling earned him an Academy Award nomination for Best Cinematography.

== Filmography ==
Key
†	Denotes films that have not yet been released

Cinematographer

Year	Title	Director	Notes
2002	Blood Work	Clint Eastwood	
2003	Mystic River	Clint Eastwood	
2004	Bobby Jones: Stroke of Genius	Rowdy Herrington	
2004	Million Dollar Baby	Clint Eastwood	
2005	The Exorcism of Emily Rose	Scott Derrickson	
2005	Romance & Cigarettes	John Turturro	
2006	Flags of Our Fathers	Clint Eastwood	
2006	Letters from Iwo Jima	Clint Eastwood	
2006	The Last Kiss	Tony Goldwyn	
2007	Rails & Ties	Alison Eastwood	
2007	Things We Lost in the Fire	Susanne Bier	
2008	Changeling	Clint Eastwood	
2008	Paris 36	Christophe Barratier	
2008	Gran Torino	Clint Eastwood	
2009	Invictus	Clint Eastwood	
2009	Tenderness	John Polson	
2010	Hereafter	Clint Eastwood	
2011	J. Edgar	Clint Eastwood	
2011	Sleepless Night	Frédéric Jardin	
2012	The Hunger Games	Gary Ross	
2012	Trouble with the Curve	Robert Lorenz	
2014	Jersey Boys	Clint Eastwood	
2014	American Sniper	Clint Eastwood	
2015	Broken Horses	Vidhu Vinod Chopra	
2016	Sully	Clint Eastwood	
2018	The 15:17 to Paris	Clint Eastwood	
2018	The Meg	Jon Turteltaub	
2021	The Ice Road	Jonathan Hensleigh	
2023	The Last Voyage of the Demeter	André Øvredal	Replaced Roman Osin
2023	In the Land of Saints and Sinners	Robert Lorenz	
2025	Ice Road: Vengeance	Jonathan Hensleigh	
TBA	Kung Fury 2 †	David Sandberg	

Director

Year	Title	Notes
2022	The Almond and the Seahorse	Co-directed with Celyn Jones

== Awards and nominations ==
Year	Award	Category	Title	Result
2008	Academy Awards	Best Cinematography	Changeling	Nominated
2008	BAFTA Awards	Best Cinematography	Changeling	Nominated
2003	Satellite Awards	Best Cinematography	Mystic River	Nominated
2006	Satellite Awards	Best Cinematography	Flags of Our Fathers	Won
2008	Satellite Awards	Best Cinematography	Changeling	Nominated
2006	Los Angeles Film Critics Association	Best Cinematography	Flags of Our Fathers	Nominated
2006	Los Angeles Film Critics Association	Best Cinematography	Letters from Iwo Jima	Nominated
2006	St. Louis Gateway Film Critics Association	Best Cinematography	Flags of Our Fathers	Nominated
2006	St. Louis Gateway Film Critics Association	Best Cinematography	Letters from Iwo Jima	Nominated
2006	Chicago Film Critics Association	Best Cinematography	Letters from Iwo Jima	Nominated
2003	Cannes Film Festival	Vulcan Award	Mystic River	Won
2008	César Awards	Best Cinematography	Paris 36	Nominated
