= Concerto Grosso No. 3 (Schnittke) =

1985 composition by Alfred Schnittke

- by Alfred Schnittke
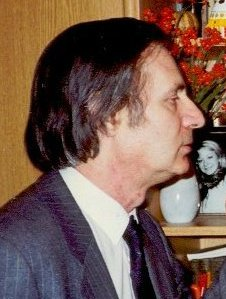
- Alfred Schnittke in 1989
- Composed: 1985
- Dedication: Oleh Krysa and Tatiana Grindenko
- Performed: 20 April 1985 — Moscow
- Duration: 22 minutes
- Movements: 5
- Scoring: Two violins, chamber string orchestra, harpsichord, piano, celesta, and bells

Alfred Schnittke composed his Concerto Grosso No. 3 for two violins, harpsichord, piano, and celesta in 1985.

== Composition ==
Schittke's Concerto Grosso No. 3 was commissioned by the Rundfunk der DDR (East German Radio) in 1985 and on the occasion of five composers having notable anniversaries in a year ending with the number 85: Heinrich Schütz, who was born in 1585; Johann Sebastian Bach, George Frideric Handel, and Domenico Scarlatti, who were all born in 1685; and Alban Berg, who was born in 1885.

This concerto was completed just before the onset of a series of strokes that affected him greatly for the rest of his creative life, marked by his Triple Concerto for violin, viola, cello (1994). This stroke took place exactly three months after the first performance of the preliminary version, which took place in Moscow on 20 April 1985, by the dedicatees Oleh Krysa and Tatiana Grindenko, with the Lithuanian Chamber Orchestra conducted by Saulius Sondeckis. The final, revised version of this concerto, however, was first performed in East Berlin on 9 December 1985, by the Dresden Chamber Orchestra with Manfred Scherzer conducting.

== Structure ==
This concerto is divided into five movements and has a typical duration of 24 minutes. The titles of each movement are taken from the tempo indications marked at the beginning. The movement list is as follows:

1. Allegro
2. Risoluto
3. Pesante
4. [No tempo indication] (later marked as Adagio)
5. Moderato

The concerto is scored for two solo violins, four first violins, four second violins, three violas, two cellos, a double bass, a harpsichord, a celesta, a piano, and a set of four church bells tuned to play B♭, A, C, and B, which spells in German musical letter notation the BACH motif.

This concerto is a great example of the style Schnittke developed over the years, which he coined polystylism.

[The concerto] begins 'beautifully', neo-classically but after some minutes the museum explodes and we stand with the fragments of the past (quotations) before the dangerous and uncertain present. The attempt is made not to become tragic and to escape the eternal melodrama of life. Did it perhaps succeed this time? Even if not, the great figures of the past cannot disappear... Their shadows are more capable of life than the pantheon scrum of today.

— Alfred Schnittke

=== I. Allegro ===
The first movement consists of two opposing sections: the "museum" (tonality) and the "uncertain present" (atonality). Even though Schnittke labelled the beginning of the first movement as neo-classical, most scholars tend to agree that it has more baroque or neo-baroque references than neo-classical ones. The concerto starts in G minor, but its chord progression does not come anywhere near a cadence, and keeps drifting further from the original key in thirds: E major, A major, F major, D major, B♭ major, G major, C minor, and A major.

The second section, marked by the sudden sound of the BACH bells in measure 28, announces the "explosion of the museum". From this point onwards, the BACH motif keeps repeating and its intervallic content collapses and keeps pushing all instruments to their lower pitch.

=== II. Risoluto ===
The multiple references to the BACH motif lead to a chaconne-like movement where chord progression keep repeating and expanding. The two soloists present different monogram rows, each of which is followed by its harmonic partner. Given the fact that the soloist do not play the rows simultaneously, there is little overlapping and cacophony. For this reason, the listener has time to identify each row as a separate entity.

=== III. Pesante ===
The third movement divides its musical forces into three groups: the soloists, the harpsichord and the strings. The movement starts again with the BACH row with the addition of scales. Each group presents different monogram rows until bar 65, where all rows from all instruments are played simultaneously both by the strings and the soloists. This leads to an ever-shifting chaotic texture which is progressively disintegrated by the surfacing of the D major triad chord, triggering a final atonal outburst and settling onto a unison D which puts an end to the movement in a complete reversal from the first movement. The next movement is expected to be played attacca.

=== IV. Adagio ===
This movement also starts with the BACH motif played by the harpsichord, which is set to disrupt the apparent sense of tonality stemming from the last bars of the previous movement. From measure 8 to measure 91, the harpsichord and the strings play quasi-tonal material, while the soloists play atonal material. The end of the movement is marked by a short cadenza played by both soloists.

=== V. Moderato ===
The final sounds of the fourth movement serve as a bridge to the last movement, where harmonic rows start sounding simultaneously and each string part begins to arpeggiate. Each instrument starts to progressively slow down and, as in the third movement, the entrance of the D pedal signals the eventual collapse of the atonal material.
