= Gimme, Gimme, Gimme (Narada Michael Walden song) =

Single by Narada Michael Walden and Patti Austin

from the album The Nature Of Things
- Released: 1985
- Genre: Pop
- Length: 4:38
- Label: Warner Bros. Records
- Songwriter(s): Jeff Cohen, Preston Glass, Narada Michael Walden

"Gimme, Gimme, Gimme" is a 1985 song performed by Narada Michael Walden and Patti Austin. Not wildly successful in US or the UK, it was a big hit in Sweden and Norway in 1985 and a top-ten hit in Belgium and in the Netherlands.

== Charts ==
=== Weekly charts ===
Chart (1985)	Peak position
Belgium (Ultratop 50 Flanders)	6
Netherlands (Dutch Top 40)	10
Netherlands (Single Top 100)	9
Norway (VG-lista)	2
Sweden (Sverigetopplistan)	2
UK Singles (OCC)	87
US Hot R&B/Hip-Hop Songs (Billboard)	39

=== Year-end charts ===
Chart (1985)	Position
Belgium (Ultratop Flanders)	85
Netherlands (Dutch Top 40)	78
Netherlands (Single Top 100)	75
