= Ken Jones (footballer, born 1937) =

Welsh footballer

Personal information
- Full name: Kenneth Boothroyd Jones
- Date of birth: 11 May 1937 (age 89)
- Place of birth: Rhosllanerchrugog, Wales
- Position: Full-back

Youth career
- Wrexham

Senior career*
Years	Team	Apps	(Gls)
1957–1960	Wrexham	31	(0)
1960–1961	Crystal Palace	4	(0)
1961–1962	Swindon Town	35	(0)
- Colwyn Bay
- * Club domestic league appearances and goals

Kenneth Boothroyd Jones (born 11 May 1937) is a Welsh former footballer, who played as a full-back. He made appearances in the English Football League with Wrexham, Crystal Palace and Swindon Town.
