= Vangie Tang =

- Born: Gigi Tang Wing Chi (鄧穎芝); 22 May 1985 (age 41); Hong Kong
- Occupation: Singer
- Years active: 2004–present

Chinese name
- Traditional Chinese: 鄧穎芝
- Simplified Chinese: 邓颖芝
Transcriptions
Standard Mandarin
- Hanyu Pinyin: deng4 ying3 zhi1
Yue: Cantonese
- Jyutping: dang6 wing6 zi1
- Musical career
- Also known as: Vangie Tang
- Origin: Hong Kong
- Genres: Cantopop
- Instrument: Singing
- Label: Sony Music

Vangie Tang Wing-chi (Chinese: 鄧穎芝, born 22 May 1985) is a Hong Kong singer. She is a top 8 finalist of the 22nd annual New Talent Singing Awards in 2003. She is signed to Sony Music of Hong Kong since 2004.

She entered the 2003 International Chinese New Talent Singing Championship – Hong Kong Regional Finals and became a top 8 finalist. Afterwards, her talents were discovered by C C To (杜自持), and under his tutelage, she was signed to Sony Music.

Her debut album Glass Shoes was released on 3 December 2004. Her second album V2 was released on 8 December 2005. Her third album Summer Never Ends was released in October 2007.
