= Peter One =

Ivorian-American folk singer

- Birth name: Pierre-Evrard Tra
- Born: Bonoua, Ivory Coast
- Instrument(s): Guitar, vocals

Pierre-Evrard Tra (born 1956), who records and performs under the stage name Peter One, is an Ivorian folk musician. He released two notable albums in Ivory Coast with Jess Sah Bi, Our Garden Needs Its Flowers in 1985, and Spirit In 9 in 1987. One immigrated to the United States in 1995 and regained wider recognition with the 2018 re-release of Our Garden and a follow-up solo album, Come Back to Me.

== Biography ==
One was born in Bonoua, Ivory Coast. At the age of 17, he entered the University of Abidjan. In both Bonoua and Abidjan he was exposed to a wide variety of African and Western popular music. One has cited the particular influence of country and folk-rock artists Don Williams, Crosby, Stills & Nash, Creedence Clearwater Revival, and Simon & Garfunkel on his early style.

In Abidjan, One formed a duo with singer/songwriter Jess Sah Bi, and they released two albums, Our Garden Needs Its Flowers (1985) and Spirit In 9 (1987). To broaden their appeal, One and Sah Bi recorded songs in Gouro, French, and English. Their albums’ popularity enabled the duo to tour Ivory Coast, Togo, and Burkina Faso. One also led a musicians’ union movement. His fame and political stances made it difficult for him to remain in Ivory Coast, so he immigrated to the United States in 1995.

One continued to pursue a musical career in the United States and self-released a solo album, Alesso, in 2009. He also became a licensed nurse. In 2013 he settled in Nashville, Tennessee. The re-release of Our Garden in 2018 by the Awesome Tapes From Africa label brought wider attention from fans, fellow musicians, and producers. Since then, One has toured domestically and in the United Kingdom. In 2023 he released a solo album, Come Back To Me. Jess Sah Bi contributed vocals on one track, Bonne Année.

== Discography ==
=== Albums with Jess Sah Bi ===
- Our Garden Needs Its Flowers (1985)
- Spirit in 9 (1987)

=== Solo albums ===
- Alesso (2009)
- Come Back to Me (2023)
