= Square Rooms =

Single by Al Corley

from the album Square Rooms
- B-side: "Don't Play with Me"
- Released: September 9, 1984
- Recorded: 1984
- Studio: Weryton Studios
- Genre: Synth-pop
- Length: 3:39
- Label: Mercury
- Songwriters: Al Corley; Harold Faltermeyer; Peter John Woods
- Producer: Harold Faltermeyer

Al Corley singles chronology
"Square Rooms" (1984)	"Cold Dresses" (1985)

"Square Rooms" is a song by American singer and actor Al Corley. It was the first single from his debut album of the same name. First released in 1984; the song was a hit single in Continental Europe, and had a moderate success in the United States in 1985.

== Background and writing ==
After two seasons playing one of the leading characters in the American TV series, Dynasty, Al Corley left the nighttime soap opera to become a singer.

The media-savvy singer affected the brooding look and attitude popular among pop stars and GQ models at the time: pouty, dark glances and tousled hair. His choice of image worked best in France, where his television performances elicited the unbridled enthusiasm of teenage girls. However, according to Elia Habib, a French charts specialist, his success was not only based on his physical appearance. Indeed, "Square Rooms"' music had a large popular appeal and had a production designed for the dance floor. It was produced and composed by the German musician Harold Faltermeyer, who had previously arranged "Self Control", a worldwide pop and dance-floor smash for Laura Branigan in 1984 which featured a similar vocal hook. Faltermeyer would achieve his greatest personal success later the same year, composing, performing and producing the score to Beverly Hills Cop, a 1984 film directed by Martin Brest, including its hit instrumental theme composition "Axel F".

== Personnel ==
- Al Corley: lead vocals and backing vocals, simmons electronic drums
- Harold Faltermeyer: synthesizers, sequencer and drum machine
- Mats Bjorklund: electric guitar
- Judy Cheek: backing vocals
- Tony Burrows: backing vocals
- Wolly Emperhof: backing vocals
- Herbert Ihl Marotta: backing vocals

== Chart performance ==
"Square Rooms" was released first in Switzerland, where it peaked at number six on October 21, 1984, and staying in the top 30 for ten weeks. The single debuted at number 47 on the French Singles Chart on January 5, 1985, and topped the chart for five nonconsecutive weeks, from March 9 to April 13, 1985. After its peak, it lingered on the charts until its 27th week, on July 20, 1985. The song reached number 12 in Italy, number 13 in Germany, and number 15 in Austria. "Square Rooms" was released last in Corley's native US, where the single reached number 80 on the Billboard Hot 100 on June 1, 1985, as well as number 26 on the Billboard dance chart the week of June 22, 1985. The single sold 2 million copies by 1985.

== Formats and track listings ==
7" single
No.	Title	Length
1.	"Square Rooms"	3:39
2.	"Don't Play with Me"	4:20

12" maxi
No.	Title	Length
1.	"Square Rooms (12" version)"	8:02
2.	"Square Rooms (7" version)"	3:39
3.	"Don't Play with Me"	4:20

- The 12-inch (long) version includes an entire additional verse prior to the first chorus. This verse is excised in both the single and album versions of the song.

== Charts ==
=== Weekly charts ===
Weekly chart performance for "Square Rooms"
Chart (1984–1985)	Peak position
Austria (Ö3 Austria Top 40)	15
Belgium (Ultratop 50 Flanders)	25
Europe (European Top 100 Singles)	18
Europe (European Airplay Top 50)	27
France (SNEP)	1
Italy (Musica e dischi)	16
Switzerland (Schweizer Hitparade)	6
US Billboard Hot 100	80
US Dance Club Songs (Billboard)	26
US Cash Box Top 100 Singles	84
West Germany (GfK)	13

=== Year-end charts ===
Year-end chart performance for "Square Rooms"
Chart (1985)	Position
France (IFOP)	8

== Covers ==
A French cover version was recorded by France Lise under the title "On vit à deux".

== See also ==
- List of number-one singles of 1985 (France)
