= Lee Hee-ah =

South Korean pianist

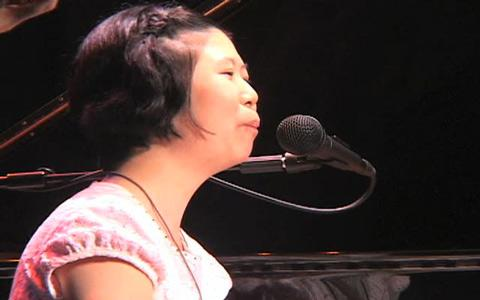
Lee Hee-ah performing in March 2013

Lee Hee-ah (born 1985) is a South Korean pianist.

== Biography ==
Lee was born with only two fingers on each hand. The thumb of her left hand does not have any bones. At age three, both her legs were amputated below the knee. The prosthetic feet she relies on to walk are soft and hurt very easily, and because of this she cannot walk for long periods of time. Her mother, Woo Kap-sun, took motion-sickness pills to deal with carsickness without realizing she was pregnant, which may have contributed to Lee's birth defects. Her father, Lee Un-bong, was injured in a war and took morphine for 10 years as he was paralyzed below the waist. He died circa 2005. When Lee was seven years old, her mother started her on the piano to train her hands, which at the time could not even hold a pencil. However, the piano later became a source of inspiration to her. She was said to have worked on one passage from Chopin's Fantaisie-Impromptu for five years.

In 1992, she won the First Prize at the South Korean National Student Music Contest, and has since won many more contests and has also played in many solo-concerts along with playing with many well-known artists. She was awarded by the then-President of South Korea, Kim Dae-jung, for Overcoming Physical Difficulty. She has also been recognized as one of the best students in Seoul by the South Korean Education Department. She currently attends The South Korean National College of Rehabilitation and Welfare.

On June 1, 2008, she wrote an open letter to Lee Myung-bak, asking him to apologize to the people for his political involvement with the South Korean protests against American imported beef.

== Albums ==
네 손가락 피아니스트 '희아'The four fingered pianist hee-ah-(2005) 네 손가락의 피아니스트 희아(喜芽) 2The four fingered pianist hee-ah 2-(2007)
