= Winifred Cecil =

American operatic soprano (1907–1985)

Winifred Cecil (August 31, 1907 – September 13, 1985) was an American operatic soprano and voice teacher.

== Life and career ==
Winifred Cecil was born in Staten Island, New York on August 31, 1907. She was trained at the Curtis Institute of Music in Philadelphia and privately with Marcella Sembrich in New York City. She also later studied privately in Europe with Elena Gerhardt.

Cecil made her professional opera debut in 1937 at the Teatro di San Carlo in Naples as Mary of Egypt in Ottorino Respighi's Maria egiziaca. She had a brief but celebrated career in Europe, singing leading roles at the Vienna State Opera, La Scala, and the Prague State Opera. Her repertoire included Countess Almaviva in The Marriage of Figaro, Donna Anna in Don Giovanni, Elisabeth in Tannhäuser, Elsa in Lohengrin, Fiora in L'amore dei tre re, Maddalena in Andrea Chénier, and title roles in Aida and Tosca.

World War II interrupted Cecil's career, and she spent the war years doing unofficial diplomatic work for the United States government while living in Italy. In 1950 she returned to the United States and spent the remainder of her life working as a voice teacher in New York City.

Winifred Cecil died in New York City on September 13, 1985.
