= Al Corley =

American actor, singer and producer

- Born: Alford Corley; Wichita, Kansas, U.S.
- Genres: Pop
- Occupations: Actor; singer; producer
- Years active: 1979–present

Alford Corley is an American actor, singer, and producer best known as Steven Carrington in Dynasty and for his 1984 hit single "Square Rooms".

== Career ==
In the late 1970s, he worked as a doorman at Studio 54 to pay for his studies at the Actors Studio. He would later appear in a VH1 Behind the Music special on Studio 54 to recount his experiences. Al Corley was the first actor to play Steven Carrington on the 1980s soap opera Dynasty. After that, Al Corley acted in fourteen movies, then produced five. Al Corley left Dynasty at the end of the second season in 1982 after complaining publicly in Interview that "Steven doesn't have any fun... He doesn't laugh; he has no humor". He also lamented Steven's "ever-shifting sexual preferences", and stated that he wanted "to do other things". The character was recast in 1983 with Jack Coleman; the change in appearance attributed to plastic surgery after an oil rig explosion. Coleman remained on the show until 1988, but Corley returned to the role of Steven for the 1991 miniseries Dynasty: The Reunion when Coleman was unavailable due to scheduling conflicts. Corley later appeared in the short-lived soap opera Bare Essence in 1983, playing Genie Francis' love interest, and co-starred opposite his former Dynasty co-star Pamela Sue Martin in the film Torchlight (1985).

He was also known as a singer in the 1980s. His 1984 single "Square Rooms", from his debut album of the same name became a number one hit in France (in 1985), also reaching No. 6 in Switzerland, No. 12 in Italy (in 1985), No. 13 in Germany, No. 15 in Austria and No. 80 in the U.S. The same year, he released "Cold Dresses", which was also a big hit in France, reaching No. 5. His second album, Riot of Color was released in 1986, and a third album, Big Picture followed in 1988.

== Personal life ==
He was married in 1989 to German actress Jessika Cardinahl. They have three children. Before his marriage, he had a brief romance with pop star Carly Simon. It was Corley (with his back to the camera) who appeared with Simon on the cover art shot for her 1981 album Torch.

He resides in the Pacific Palisades area of Los Angeles.

== Filmography ==
=== Television ===
- Women at West Point (1979; television movie)
- And Baby Makes Six (1979; television movie)
- ABC Afterschool Specials (1979; 1 episode)
- The Women's Room (1980; television movie)
- The Love Boat (1980; 1 episode)
- Dynasty (1981–82; 35 episodes)
- Bare Essence (1983; 2 episodes)
- Dynasty: The Reunion (1991; mini-series)
- Hamburger Gift (1992; television movie)
- A Kiss Goodnight (1994; television movie)

=== Film ===
- Squeeze Play! (1979) (billed as "Alford Corley")
- Honky Tonk Freeway (1981)
- Torchlight (1985)
- Alpha City (1985)
- Incident at Q (1986)
- Hard Days, Hard Nights (1989)
- Otto – Der Liebesfilm (1992)
- Don Juan DeMarco (1994)
- Cowboy Up (2001)
- Scorched (2001)
- Bigger Than the Sky (2005) (also director)
- You Kill Me (2007)
- Stolen (2009) (also producer)
- Kill the Irishman (2011)
- The Ice Road (2021)
- Ice Road: Vengeance (2025)
- The Mongoose (2026)

== Discography ==
=== Studio albums ===
- Square Rooms (1984)
- Riot of Color (1986)
- The Big Picture (1988)

=== Singles ===
- 1984: "Over Me"
- 1984: "Remember"/"Thought I'd Ring You" (with Shirley Bassey)
- 1984: "Square Rooms" – #1 FRA, #6 SWI, #12 ITA, #13 GER, #15 Ö3AUS, #80 US, #26 US Dance
- 1984: "Cold Dresses" – #5 FRA
- 1986: "Face to Face" - #71 GER
- 1988: "Land of the Giants" - #70 GER
- 1989: "Where Are the Children"
