= Lover Why =

Single by Century

from the album ...And Soul It Goes
- Released: 1985
- Recorded: 1985
- Genre: Progressive rock; hard rock
- Length: 6:00
- Label: Carrere Records
- Songwriters: Jean-Louis Milford; John Wesley; Paul Ives

Century singles chronology
"Lover Why" (1985)	"Jane" (1986)

"Lover Why" is the debut single by French rock band Century, released in 1985. The song is from their debut album, ...And Soul It Goes.

It was the group's most successful song, topping the charts in France and Portugal, as well as entering the charts in Germany (#32), Belgium (#33) and Switzerland (#11). In Brazil, the song became popular for being featured in the soundtrack for Rede Globo's soap opera Ti Ti Ti.

There are dance versions of "Lover Why" made by Dee Martin (1993) and Mark Ashley (2000). The song was re-recorded in 1987 by Portuguese musician José Maria.

== Track listing ==
No.	Title	Length
1.	"Lover Why"	6:00
2.	"Rainin' in the Park"	3:13

Portugal 7" single

No.	Title	Length
1.	"Lover Why"	5:59
2.	"Nigel Understands"	6:15

== Charts ==
Weekly chart performance for "Lover Why"
Charts (1985-1987)	Peak position
Belgium (Ultratop 50 Flanders)	33
France (SNEP)	1
Portugal (AFYVE)	1
Switzerland (Schweizer Hitparade)	11
Uruguay (CUD)	1
West Germany (GfK Entertainment Charts)	32

== Certifications and sales ==
Region	Certification	Certified units/sales
France (SNEP)	Gold	500,000^{*}
^{*} Sales figures based on certification alone.
