= Voyage of the Rock Aliens =

- Original movie poster
- Directed by: James Fargo; Bob Giraldi
- Written by: Edward Gold; James Guidotti
- Starring: Pia Zadora; Craig Sheffer; Tom Nolan; Ruth Gordon; Michael Berryman; Alison La Placa; Jermaine Jackson
- Cinematography: Gilbert Taylor
- Edited by: Malcolm Campbell
- Music by: Jack White
- Production companies: KGA/Interplanetary-Curb Communications, Inter Planetary
- Distributed by: Fox Lorber
- Release date: March 9, 1984
- Running time: 97 min.
- Country: United States
- Language: English

Voyage of the Rock Aliens is a 1984 film directed by James Fargo and starring Pia Zadora and Craig Sheffer.

== Plot ==
A guitar-shaped spaceship and Robot 1359 (voiced by Peter Cullen), search the universe for the source of rock and roll music. After discounting the planets Teldar and Malox, they come across Acirema. After listening to a dance/musical performance of “When the Rain Begins to Fall”, featuring Pia Zadora and Jermaine Jackson portraying members of rival gangs who fall in love, à la Romeo and Juliet, 1359 discounts this one too.

The last planet left to visit is Earth. 1359 wakes the crew to visit the planet. A rocket telephone booth lands in the town of Speelburgh and ABCD (pronounced "Absid") (Tom Nolan) with his group of aliens exit. The humanoid aliens force robot 1359 to take the form of a fire hydrant. Only the Sheriff (Ruth Gordon) witnesses their landing, and she becomes obsessed with alien invaders.

Dee Dee (Pia Zadora) is a singer in high school who is in love with Frankie (Craig Sheffer), the leader of Speelburgh's local high school rock band, The Pack (Jimmy and the Mustangs). She sings of her heart's desire to best friend Diane (Alison La Placa). Dee Dee's dream is to sing with the band; Frankie loves her but does not want her to sing with them. Meanwhile, a giant creature with tentacles lives in nearby Lake Eerie, a product of environmental pollution, and it periodically extends its arms throughout the town.

As the aliens, played by the rock band RHEMA, search the area, they encounter Dee Dee, Frankie and The Pack at the local maltshop. Absid literally loses his head over Dee Dee (i.e. he explodes and needs to be put back together by his crew) and decides to win her heart. Meanwhile, his cohorts search for specimens such as flowers, leaves and cow chips. STUVWXYZ (pronounced "Stovitz") (Patrick Byrnes) stumbles across the path of two crazed mass murderers, Chainsaw (Michael Berryman) and The Breather (Wallace Merck), who recently escaped from The Speelburgh Asylum for the Criminally Insane.

Feeling dejected by Frankie's refusal to let her sing, Dee Dee succumbs to the charms of Absid, who asks her to be the singer of his band at the Heidi High Cotillion Dance and Battle of the Bands. Frankie and The Pack arrive at the school to keep the aliens out... but they cannot stop them because of the aliens' powers: they teleport into the bathroom through the toilets. Dee Dee finally gets her chance to sing at a battle of the bands between the aliens and The Pack, with the very jealous Frankie furious that Dee Dee has switched sides.

Absid and Dee Dee sneak off to the lake. While the tentacled creature searches the banks, Absid tries to convince Dee Dee to fly back to his planet. Hesitating, she agrees to visit the ship, but discovers once there that she will have to give up all human emotion to live on the alien's planet.

Meanwhile, Diane encounters Chainsaw at the high school. The crazed killer intends to make her his next victim, but his rusty chainsaw breaks down. Love blooms as Diane helps Chainsaw fix his chainsaw.

Bolting back to her true love, Frankie, Dee Dee finds him cornered in a school hallway by the Breather. Frankie manages to fend off his rival, only to be attacked by the monster from the lake, which has gotten loose and surrounded the school with its tentacles. With his chainsaw now repaired, Chainsaw rescues everyone.

In the end, the aliens board their ship and Absid decides to leave the humans "a little alien persuasion". He fiddles with the buttons in the booth and clears away all of the town's pollution. He also turns the brutal Pack into a group of boy scouts. The creature leaves town, the skies clear, flowers bloom and Frankie and Dee Dee sing and dance into a smogless sunset.

== Cast ==
- Pia Zadora as Dee Dee
- Craig Sheffer as Frankie
- Tom Nolan as Absid (ABCD)
- Alison La Placa as Diane
- Michael Berryman as Chainsaw
- RHEMA as The Aliens
- Jimmy & the Mustangs as The Pack
- Ruth Gordon as Sheriff
- Jermaine Jackson as Rain
- Peter Cullen as the voice of 1359
- Wallace Merck as Breather

== Songs ==
- "Openhearted" – Real Life
- "When the Rain Begins to Fall" – Jermaine Jackson and Pia Zadora
- "21st Century" – RHEMA
- "New Orleans" – Neil Sedaka with Gary U.S. Bonds
- "Real Love" – Pia Zadora
- "Try to See It My Way" – Dara Sedaka
- "Back on the Streets" – 3 Speed (written by Kiss (band) guitarist Vinnie Vincent and Richie Friedman)
- "Justine" – Jimmy & the Mustangs
- "That's Life" – RHEMA
- "You Bring Out the Lover in Me" – Pia Zadora
- "Always" – Real Life
- "Combine Man" – RHEMA
- "Little Bit of Heaven" – Pia Zadora and Mark Spiro
- "She Doesn't Mean a Thing to Me" – Mark Spiro
- "Come On" – Jimmy and the Mustangs
- "Trouble Maker" – Jimmy and the Mustangs
- "Let's Dance Tonight (Medley)" – Pia Zadora, Jimmy & the Mustangs, and RHEMA
- "Get Out and Dance" – RHEMA
- "My World Is Empty Without You" – John Farnham and Rainey Haynes
- "Nature of the Beast" – Michael Bradley
- "Before the Jupiter Effect" – Cliff Sarde
- "When the Rain Begins to Fall (reprise)" – Pia Zadora and Jermaine Jackson
- "End Credits Medley" ("Let's Dance Tonight", "She Doesn't Mean a Thing to Me", "Justine", "Back on the Street", "21st Century")

== Production ==
The original script by James Guidotti, Attack of the Aliens, was conceived as a B-movie spoof. "It's a little like sitting home and watching TV late on a Saturday night, all the while switching channels from 5 to 9 to 11 and to 13," Guidotti explained. "On channel 5 they're airing an old Beach Party movie; on 9 one about alien invaders; on 11 a film about a mad, homicidal maniac on the loose; and on 13 a rock 'n roll program." When Guidotti's script was spotted by executives at the production company Inter Planetary Curb, Vice President of Development Edward Gold and consultant Charles Hairston polished the script, turned it into a musical, and the film went into production under the title Attack of the Rock 'n' Roll Aliens.

Pia Zadora was first cast as a result of her previous work on stage and screen. With Zadora attached to the film, they began fleshing out the cast. The Frankie character sings two songs in the film, but producers wanted someone with acting experience, so Craig Sheffer was offered the role, which he chose over a television series, another film and the Broadway play Torch Song Trilogy (the latter of which he took after Rock Aliens had wrapped). Sheffer initially had another theory as to why he was cast: "The funniest part is that I thought they hired me for my long hair," Sheffer revealed. He and other cast members were in for a rude awakening when the filmmakers sent them to the barber shop. Similarly, Tom Nolan was chosen to portray alien leader Absid based on his acting background rather than singing abilities.

Then-president of Curb Records Dick Whitehouse needed a new wave band for the film and learned of RHEMA through an acquaintance. Whitehouse, star Pia Zadora and their entourage flew to Arizona to attend a showcase by RHEMA and subsequently cast in the film, minus bass player Bobby Freeman.

Principal production of the film took place in Atlanta, Georgia for 9 weeks in 1983. Outside scenes were shot in downtown Fairburn, Georgia. In these outside scenes many extras were local Fairburn residents including the members of the Fairburn Volunteer Fire Department.

In April 1984, Pia Zadora and Jermaine Jackson headed to Italy aboard Zadora's personal jet to shoot a music video for their duet "When the Rain Begins to Fall". Although the song already appeared in the movie (with Sheffer lip-synching Jackson's part), the plot of the music video had absolutely nothing to do with the film, and there was an entirely different cast and crew, it was decided that the video would be tacked onto the end of the film. Ultimately, the filmmakers placed the music video into the film as part of the opening sequence.

== Soundtrack ==
A soundtrack album was released by Curb Records in 1984. The cover of the album downplays the film in favor of the hit single "When the Rain Begins to Fall", prominently featuring Jermaine Jackson and Pia Zadora. Many of the songs heard in the film are not on the album and numerous songs have different arrangements. In many countries, the album was released on vinyl and cassette; in Germany it was also issued on CD.

Original Soundtrack Album

1. "When the Rain Begins to Fall" – Jermaine Jackson and Pia Zadora
2. "Little Bit of Heaven" – Pia Zadora and Mark Spiro
3. "Real Love" – Pia Zadora
4. "Nature of the Beast" – Michael Bradley
5. "Let's Dance Tonight" – Pia Zadora
6. "Back on the Street" – 3 Speed
7. "Openhearted" – Real Life
8. "She Doesn't Mean a Thing to Me" – Mark Spiro
9. "21st Century" – RHEMA
10. "Justine" – Jimmy and the Mustangs
11. "My World Is Empty Without You" – John Farnham and Rainey Haynes
- Zadora's missing song from the film, "You Bring Out the Lover in Me", appeared on her album Let's Dance Tonight, which included alternate versions of most of her songs from the film. "When the Rain Begins to Fall" was also issued in a vast array of singles and remixes.
- Neil Sedaka's "New Orleans" was released on his album Come See About Me, and several singles featuring alternate versions of the song were released.
- Dara Sedaka's "Try to See It My Way" is heard when Dee Dee meets Frankie in the malt shop but it's not listed in the credits of the movie. This is a cover of a 1980 Bryan Adams song and he provided backing vocals for her version, which was issued on Sedaka's album I'm Your Girlfriend (1982).
- Both songs by Real Life were issued on their album Heartland (1983).
- Cliff Sarde's "Before the Jupiter Effect" and Michael Bradley's "Bobbie Ann" are both cited in the ending credits but were not utilized in the final cut of the film.
- The additional songs from the film by Jimmy and the Mustangs ("Come On", "Trouble Maker", "Let's Dance Tonight"), Michael Bradley ("Bobbie Ann") and RHEMA ("That's Life", "Combine Man", "Get Out and Dance", "Let's Dance Tonight") were never issued by Curb Records, though promotional music videos exist for many of them and the RHEMA tracks were later distributed online by former band members.
- An "Expanded Soundtrack" featuring more than 50 tracks (including a variety of remixes, alternate versions and additional songs by RHEMA and Jimmy and the Mustangs) was compiled by a fan in mp3 format and first surfaced online in 2010. Subsequently, this collection went on to pop up on other sites, torrents and it has also surfaced for sale as multi-disc CD bootlegs.

== Home video ==
- The film was released on VHS in the United States and Japan in February 1988 by Prism Entertainment.
- In the United Kingdom, it was released on VHS by Raven Home Video in 1997.
- In 2005, the movie was issued on DVD in the United Kingdom by Moonstone Pictures. Fans have complained about the quality of this release, which appears to be transferred from video.
- In 2009, the film was issued on DVD by Alive/CMV Laservision in Germany. Subtitled "Let's Dance Tonight", this version features a very clear full-screen print with German and English audio options, as well as the theatrical trailer and alternate opening/ending scenes. Although it's the same version as that released in the United States, the film runs a few minutes shorter as a result of PAL speedup.
- In addition to the single-disc German version, a 2-disc Special Edition was also issued. This version includes alternate German credits and UK ending, a photo gallery, trailer, and a vintage 45 minute Curb Records promotional reel of rare music videos of the soundtrack songs "When the Rain Begins to Fall" (as utilized in the film), "Justine" (shot on video to coincide with the earlier release of Jimmy and the Mustangs' self-titled album), "Openhearted", "She Doesn't Mean a Thing to Me", "Back on the Street", "Nature of the Beast", "21st Century", "New Orleans", "Combine Man" and edits of Pia Zadora's "Let's Dance Tonight" and "Little Bit of Heaven" which deviate from the versions featured in the film.
- In 2013, Alive/CMV reissued the film on a Blu-Ray which included both widescreen and open-matte versions (though they're upscaled from the same transfer used for the earlier German DVD releases). All of the extras from the 2-disc special edition were ported over, and new to this version were four TV spots, a 17-minute movie highlights promo reel, a photo gallery and additional music videos for "Trouble Maker", "Real Love", "You Bring Out the Lover in Me", and yet another variation of "Little Bit of Heaven".
- Vinegar Syndrome was granted the rights to restore the film and released it on BluRay in July 2022 and features interviews with Patrick Byrnes, Greg Bond, Marc Jackson, Jeffrey Casey and Crag Jensen from the band RHEMA. The release also contains interviews with producers, Max and Micheline Keller, actor, Michael Berryman, Writer, James Guidotti, Costumer, Donzaleigh Abernathy and Visual Effects Supervisor, Peter Chesney.
