= List of number-one hits of 1984 (Germany) =

This is a list of the German Media Control Top100 Singles Chart number-ones of 1984.

Key
†	Indicates best-performing single and album of 1984

Issue date	Song	Artist	Album	Artist
2 January	"Jenseits von Eden"	Nino de Angelo	"No Parlez"	Paul Young
9 January	"Jenseits von Eden"	Nino de Angelo	"No Parlez"	Paul Young
16 January	"Jenseits von Eden"	Nino de Angelo	"No Parlez"	Paul Young
23 January	"Jenseits von Eden"	Nino de Angelo	"No Parlez"	Paul Young
30 January	"Jenseits von Eden"	Nino de Angelo	"No Parlez"	Paul Young
6 February	"Jenseits von Eden"	Nino de Angelo	"No Parlez"	Paul Young
13 February	"Jenseits von Eden"	Nino de Angelo	"? (Fragezeichen)"	Nena
20 February	"Only You"	The Flying Pickets	"? (Fragezeichen)"	Nena
27 February	"Relax"	Frankie Goes to Hollywood	"? (Fragezeichen)"	Nena
5 March	"Relax"	Frankie Goes to Hollywood	"? (Fragezeichen)"	Nena
12 March	"Relax"	Frankie Goes to Hollywood	"Carambolage"	Peter Maffay
19 March	"Relax"	Frankie Goes to Hollywood	"? (Fragezeichen)"	Nena
26 March	"Relax"	Frankie Goes to Hollywood	"Carambolage"	Peter Maffay
2 April	"Relax"	Frankie Goes to Hollywood	"Ammonia Avenue"	The Alan Parsons Project
9 April	"Big in Japan"	Alphaville	"? (Fragezeichen)"	Nena
16 April	"Big in Japan"	Alphaville	"? (Fragezeichen)"	Nena
23 April	"Big in Japan"	Alphaville	"Ammonia Avenue"	The Alan Parsons Project
30 April	"People Are People"	Depeche Mode	"Ammonia Avenue"	The Alan Parsons Project
7 May	"People Are People"	Depeche Mode	"Ammonia Avenue"	The Alan Parsons Project
14 May	"People Are People"	Depeche Mode	"Ammonia Avenue"	The Alan Parsons Project
21 May	"Send Me an Angel"	Real Life	"Ammonia Avenue"	The Alan Parsons Project
28 May	"Send Me an Angel"	Real Life	"Man on the Line"	Chris De Burgh
4 June	"Send Me an Angel"	Real Life	"Man on the Line"	Chris De Burgh
11 June	"Send Me an Angel"	Real Life	"Man on the Line"	Chris De Burgh
18 June	"Self Control" †	Laura Branigan	"Man on the Line"	Chris De Burgh
25 June	"Self Control" †	Laura Branigan	"Zwesche Salzjebäck un Bier"	BAP
2 July	"Self Control" †	Laura Branigan	"Zwesche Salzjebäck un Bier"	BAP
9 July	"Self Control" †	Laura Branigan	"Man on the Line"	Chris De Burgh
16 July	"Self Control" †	Laura Branigan	"Discovery"	Mike Oldfield
23 July	"Self Control" †	Laura Branigan	"Discovery"	Mike Oldfield
30 July	"Two Tribes"	Frankie Goes to Hollywood	"Discovery"	Mike Oldfield
6 August	"High Energy"	Evelyn Thomas	"Discovery"	Mike Oldfield
13 August	"High Energy"	Evelyn Thomas	"Discovery"	Mike Oldfield
20 August	"High Energy"	Evelyn Thomas	"Discovery"	Mike Oldfield
27 August	"High Energy"	Evelyn Thomas	"Discovery"	Mike Oldfield
3 September	"Reach Out"	Giorgio Moroder	"Discovery"	Mike Oldfield
10 September	"Reach Out"	Giorgio Moroder	"Discovery"	Mike Oldfield
17 September	"Reach Out"	Giorgio Moroder	"4630 Bochum" †	Herbert Grönemeyer
24 September	"Reach Out"	Giorgio Moroder	"4630 Bochum" †	Herbert Grönemeyer
1 October	"I Just Called to Say I Love You"	Stevie Wonder	"4630 Bochum" †	Herbert Grönemeyer
8 October	"I Just Called to Say I Love You"	Stevie Wonder	"4630 Bochum" †	Herbert Grönemeyer
15 October	"I Just Called to Say I Love You"	Stevie Wonder	"Diamond Life"	Sade
22 October	"I Just Called to Say I Love You"	Stevie Wonder	"4630 Bochum" †	Herbert Grönemeyer
29 October	"I Just Called to Say I Love You"	Stevie Wonder	"Diamond Life"	Sade
5 November	"I Just Called to Say I Love You"	Stevie Wonder	"Diamond Life"	Sade
12 November	"When the Rain Begins to Fall"	Jermaine Jackson & Pia Zadora	"Diamond Life"	Sade
19 November	"When the Rain Begins to Fall"	Jermaine Jackson & Pia Zadora	"Diamond Life"	Sade
26 November	"When the Rain Begins to Fall"	Jermaine Jackson & Pia Zadora	"Diamond Life"	Sade
3 December	"When the Rain Begins to Fall"	Jermaine Jackson & Pia Zadora	"Diamond Life"	Sade
10 December	"Wild Boys"	Duran Duran	"Diamond Life"	Sade
17 December	"Wild Boys"	Duran Duran	"Diamond Life"	Sade
24 December	"Wild Boys"	Duran Duran	"Arena"	Duran Duran
31 December	No release (Note: Same issue as for 24 December.)			

== See also ==
- List of number-one hits (Germany)
