= Master Mix =

Remix album by Real Life
- Released: November 1984
- Genre: Synthpop; new wave
- Label: Wheatley (AUS); Curb (Europe)
- Producer: Steve Hillage; Ross Cockle (Track A1)

Real Life chronology
Heartland (1983)	Master Mix (1984)	Flame (1985)

Master Mix is a remix album by Australian synthpop band Real Life. The album was released in a limited edition in Australia in November 1984 and features remixed versions of songs from the band's debut studio album Heartland. The album peaked at number 74 on the Australian Kent Music Report.

== Track listing ==
All songs written by David Sterry and Richard Zatorski.

Side A
No.	Title	Length
1.	"Send Me an Angel" (Extended Mix)	5:02
2.	"Catch Me I'm Falling" (Extended Mix)	5:55

Side B
No.	Title	Length
1.	"Always" (Steve Hillage remix)	3:55
2.	"Openhearted" (Steve Hillage remix)	3:51
3.	"Exploding Bullets" (Steve Hillage remix)	4:19

== Charts ==
Chart (1984)	Peak position
Australia (Kent Music Report)	74

== Release history ==
Country	Date	Format	Label	Catalogue
Australia	November 1984	Vinyl Record	Wheatley Records	VAL1 0470
