= Girls Just Want to Have Fun (soundtrack) =

Soundtrack album by Various artists
- Released: 1985
- Recorded: 1985
- Genre: Hard rock; Hi-NRG; synth-pop
- Label: Mercury; PolyGram

The Girls Just Want to Have Fun soundtrack was released in 1985 on CD, vinyl and cassette in the United States by PolyGram and Mercury Records. It's been out of print for quite some time and is now quite rare and expensive. The only song that received any attention from the soundtrack was "(Come On) Shout" by Alex Brown, a former backing vocalist for Ray Charles. The song charted at #76 on the Billboard Hot 100 (in addition to peaking at #27 on the Dance chart and #66 on the R&B chart). The accompanying music video received substantial airplay as well.

The compact cassette remained widely available until being discontinued in 2000 when Mercury Records was retooled by its parent company Universal Music Group and PolyGram was purchased by Universal Music Group.

== Track listing ==
1. "(Come On) Shout" – Alex Brown (Marti Sharron, Gary Skardina)
2. "On the Loose" – Chris Farren (Glenn Frey, Jack Tempchin)
3. "I Can Fly" – Rainey (Duncan Pain, Mark Holding, Don Grady, Laurie Riley)
4. "Dancing in Heaven (Orbital Be-Bop)" – Q-Feel (Martin Page, Brian Fairweather)
5. "Girls Just Want to Have Fun" – Deborah Galli, Tami Holbrook, and Meredith Marshall (Robert Hazard)
6. "Dancing in the Street" – Animotion (Marvin Gaye, William Stevenson, Ivory Joe Hunter)
7. "Too Cruel" – Amy Hart (Amy Hart, Tim Tobias)
8. "Technique" – Rainey (Jay Levy, Jack Conrad)
9. "Wake Up the Neighborhood" – Holland (Tom Holland, Joey Cetner, Mike Batio)
