= Girls Just Want to Have Fun (disambiguation) =

"Girls Just Want to Have Fun" is the first major single released by Cyndi Lauper.

Girls Just Want to Have Fun may also refer to:

== Television ==
- "Girls Just Wanna Have Fun", an episode in the television series Xena: Warrior Princess
- "Girls Just Want to Have Fun", an episode from season 2 of Degrassi The Next Generation
- "Girls Just Want to Have Fun", an episode from season 2 of Married... with Children
- "Girls Just Want to Have Fun", an episode from the first season of mixed-ish

== Other uses ==
- Girls Just Want to Have Fun (film), starring Shannen Doherty and Sarah Jessica Parker
  - Girls Just Want to Have Fun (soundtrack)
- Girls Just Wanna Have Fun!, 1984 album by The Nolans
- "Girls Just Wanna Have Fun" (Shaggy song), a song by reggae musician Shaggy featuring Eve
- "Girls Just Want to Have Fun", a song by Ecco2k and Bladee from the album Crest
