= Lifetime (Real Life album) =

Studio album by Real Life
- Released: October 1990
- Studio: Metropolis Audio, Melbourne; Hothouse Audio, Melbourne
- Genre: Electronic
- Length: 53:09
- Label: Curb
- Producer: Real Life; Steve Hillage; Nigel Wright

Real Life chronology
Let's Fall in Love (1989)	Lifetime (1990)	Happy (1997)

Singles from Lifetime
- 1. "God Tonight" Released: September 1990; 2. "Kiss the Ground" Released: November 1990

Lifetime is the third studio album by the Australian band Real Life, released in October 1990 by Curb Records. The album is the first release by the band without co-founder Richard Zatorski's involvement. The tracks "God Tonight" and "Kiss the Ground" reached the Modern Rock and Dance charts in the United States.

== Reception ==
Professional ratings
Review scores
Source	Rating
AllMusic	3/5 stars

Tomas Mureika from AllMusic believed the album was "better than much of the pop music out at the time, it feels too much like a commercial product rather than a labor of passion like Heartland or Flame", adding "'Kiss the Ground', 'Push of Love' and 'Let's Start a Fire' are all perfectly solid synth pop songs—but, alas, the era of synth pop was over by 1990 and Sterry had yet to discover the type of music that would ultimately make Real Life great again."

== Track listing ==
No.	Title	Writer(s)	Length
1.	"God Tonight"	David Sterry, Danny Simcic	5:13
2.	"Kiss the Ground"	Sterry, Steve Williams	3:37
3.	"5-4-3-2-1"	Sterry	5:41
4.	"Rescue Me"	Sterry, Williams, Dennis Lambert	6:56
5.	"Sister Sister"	Sterry, Williams	4:22
6.	"Push of Love"	Sterry, Williams	8:35
7.	"Torture to Me"	Sterry, Williams	5:48
8.	"Let's Start a Fire"	Sterry, Williams	4:37
9.	"Do It Again"	Sterry, Allan Johnson, Simcic	4:05
10.	"Lifetime"	Sterry, Williams	4:15

== Personnel ==
Adapted from the album liner notes.

Real Life

- David Sterry – vocals, guitar
- Steve Williams – keyboards
- Allan Johnson – bass
- Danny Simcic – drums

Additional musicians

- Tracy Ackerman – backing vocals (3, 5, 8)
- Susie Ahern – backing vocals (3, 5, 8)
- Miquette Giraudy – backing vocals (6)

Technical

- Real Life – producer (1–3, 5, 9, 10)
- Steve Hillage – producer (4, 6–8)
- Nigel Wright – co-producer (1–3, 5, 9, 10)
- Doug Brady – engineer
- Paul Kosky – engineer
- Melita Jagic – engineer
- Bruce Johnson – engineer
- Robin Sellars – engineer
- Tom Baker – mastering
- Wilson Design Group – art direction, design
- James Widdowson – photography

== Charts ==
Chart (1990)	Peak position
Australian Albums (ARIA Charts)	90

== Release history ==
Country	Date	Format	Label	Catalogue
Australia	October 1990	Vinyl Record; CD	RCA Records	VPCD 6835
United States of America	1990	Compact Disc; Cassette	Curb Records	D2-77271
