= Catch Me I'm Falling =

1983 single by Real Life

Single by Real Life

from the album Heartland
- B-side: "Exploded Bullets"
- Released: December 1983 (AUS); March 1984 (US)
- Recorded: 1983
- Genre: New wave; synth-pop
- Length: 3:58
- Label: Wheatley; Curb
- Songwriters: David Sterry; Richard Zatorski
- Producer: Steve Hillage

Real Life singles chronology
"Openhearted" (1983)	"'Catch Me I'm Falling'" (1983)	"Always" (1984)

"Catch Me I'm Falling" is a song by Australian new wave and synth-pop band Real Life. Released in December 1983 as the third single from the band's debut studio album Heartland. The song is built on the success of the debut single "Send Me an Angel" and became the band's second top 10 hit in Australia, spending 27 weeks in the Kent Music Report top 100. It also hit no. 40 on the Billboard Hot 100 charts in the United States.

== Track listings ==
7" single (WRS-006)

1. "Catch Me I'm Falling" – 3:33
2. "Thrill Me" – 4:12

7" single (MCA-52362/ MCA 885)

1. "Catch Me I'm Falling" – 4:02
2. "Exploding Bullets" – 4:09

12" single (RCA / WRST 007)

1. "Catch Me I'm Falling" (Edit) – 4:10
2. "Exploding Bullets" (Extended Mix) – 5:38
3. "Catch Me I'm Falling" (Extended Mix) – 5:52

Dave Aude Remix Single

1. "Catch Me I'm Falling" (Dave Aude Remix) - 3:43
2. "Catch Me I'm Falling" (Dave Aude Extended Remix) - 5:03

== Charts ==
=== Weekly charts ===
Chart (1984)	Peak position
Australia (Kent Music Report)	8
Germany (Media Control Charts)	9
Switzerland (Swiss Hitparade)	12
U.S. Billboard Hot 100	40
U.S. Cash Box Top 100	46

=== Year-end charts ===
Chart (1984)	Position
Australia (Kent Music Report)	66

== Cover versions ==
- 1984: Conny & Jean ("Hilf mir, ich liebe dich"/"Wege durch die Nacht")
- 1984: Headliner (Thomas Anders)
- 1998: At Vance
- 2005: Novaspace
- 2020: Topmodelz
