= Tim Tobias =

Tim Tobias or Timothy Tobias may refer to:

- Timothy J. Tobias (1952–2006), American film composer and jazz musician from Chicago, Illinois
- Tim Tobias, American rock guitarist and bassist in Circus Devils and Guided by Voices
