= Amy Hart =

Amy Hart may refer to:

- Amy Hart (singer) (active since 1980s), American singer
- Amy Hart (TV personality) (active since 2019), English media personality
