= Rad (film) =

1986 film by Hal Needham

- Theatrical release poster
- Directed by: Hal Needham
- Written by: Geoffrey Edwards; Sam Bernard
- Produced by: Robert L. Levy
- Starring: Bill Allen; Lori Loughlin; Talia Shire; Ray Walston
- Cinematography: Richard Leiterman
- Edited by: Carl Kress
- Music by: James Di Pasquale
- Production company: TaliaFilm II Productions
- Distributed by: Tri-Star Pictures
- Release date: March 21, 1986
- Running time: 91 minutes
- Country: United States
- Language: English
- Budget: $3 million
- Box office: $2.5 million

Rad (international title: Hell Track) is a 1986 American sports film directed by Hal Needham from a screenplay by Sam Bernard and Geoffrey Edwards (son of Pink Panther creator Blake Edwards). The film stars Bill Allen, Lori Loughlin, Talia Shire, Jack Weston and Ray Walston, along with 1984 Olympic gymnastics champion Bart Conner. The film underperformed at the box office, grossing $2.5 million against a budget of $3 million, and received mixed reviews from critics. However, it has developed a substantial and loyal following, and is now considered a significant cult film.

== Background ==
In the early 1980s, while looking for script ideas, co-writer and producer Sam Bernard noticed kids performing BMX tricks in a Los Angeles park. Bernard and Geoffrey Edwards pitched the project to Hal Needham by taking him to a BMX tournament, Needham signed on after watching the riders. Originally written for teenagers, the script was later aimed at a younger audience.

== Plot ==
Cru Jones is a teenage BMX racer who lives in a small town with his younger sister Wesley and their mother. Cru faces a tough decision: try to qualify for Helltrack or take the SAT, which is on the same day as the qualifying races. Winning Helltrack means $100,000, a new Chevrolet Corvette, and fame. Against his mother's wishes, Cru chooses to try to qualify for Helltrack, and does so successfully.

The Helltrack race is endorsed by the city and by Duke Best, the duplicitous president of FAB (the Federation of American Bicyclists), also the owner of Mongoose Racing. Duke keeps adjusting the rules to keep Cru out of the race and ensure BMX star Bart Taylor has an easy road to victory and a financial windfall for Mongoose Racing, Bart's sponsor.

Numerous BMX racers show up for Helltrack. Cru meets Christian Hollings, who becomes his romantic interest. At Cru's senior prom, he and Christian perform freestyle bike stunts on the dance floor as their classmates watch. After being blocked from the race due to a last-minute rule change on participant sponsorship, Cru is ready to give up Helltrack until Wesley customizes a shirt for him to wear at the event. It reads "Cru is RAD." Inspired by this, Cru and his friends use the money he won from qualifying ($10,000) to found a small T-shirt business: "Rad Racing." However, a few days before the race, Duke changes the rules yet again, claiming any company sponsoring a racer must be worth at least $50,000. When the townspeople hear about this, they rally around Cru; their contributions and a particularly a generous donation from wealthy Mr. Timmer, provide Rad Racing with enough money for Cru to enter Helltrack.

During Helltrack, Duke orders twins Rex and Rod Reynolds to take out Cru and clear Bart's path to victory. They slow him down, but fail to take him out entirely. In the final stretch of the race, Taylor slows down to let the second-place Cru catch up, so that they can have a true one-on-one without interference. Cru edges out Taylor to win Helltrack.

Duke drops Taylor from Mongoose Racing, but Cru (at Wesley's suggestion) offers him a spot on the Rad Racing team, which Taylor accepts.

== Cast ==
- Bill Allen as Cru Jones
- Lori Loughlin as Christian Hollings
- Talia Shire as Mrs. Jones
- Ray Walston as Burton Timmer
- Alfie Wise as Eliott Dole
- Jack Weston as Duke Best
- Bart Conner as Bart Taylor
- Marta Kober as Becky
- Jamie Clarke as Luke
- Laura Jacoby as Wesley Jones
- H.B. Haggerty as Sgt. Smith
- Chad Hayes as Rex Reynolds
- Carey Hayes as Rod Reynolds
- Kellie McQuiggin as Foxy
- Beverly Hendry as Tiger
- Shawna Burnett as Amy
- Graeme Davies as Harold
- Logan T. Wotton as Miles
- Jeff Kress as Rick
- Gordon Signer as Mayor Coop Jenkins
- Nancy MacDonald as Mrs. Grey
- Christian Roerig as Dirk Roburn
- Laird Mackintosh as Bob Kachler
- Rick McNair as Bob the Cook

== Production ==
The film was partially shot in Cochrane, Alberta, Canada, as well as at Bowness Sr. High School and Bowness Park, both in Calgary, Alberta.

== Release ==
The film was theatrically released on March 21, 1986. A home video release followed on April 27, 1988.

== Reception ==
The film received mixed reviews and under-performed commercially during its release. The New York Times stated "Teen-age ears may not split from the music or ache from the dialogue, but anybody over 20, beware: 'You're willing to sacrifice building a solid future for a bicycle race,' says the hero's mother. 'It's very self-destructive.' If only he had listened to mom – but who can blame him for preferring his bicycle?" On the website Rotten Tomatoes, Rad was given an approval rating of 46%, based on reviews from 13 critics. In 2013, The Guardian writer Nick Evershed found it had the largest discrepancy between critical and audience response (which at that time was 0% based on 5 reviews, versus 91%, based on 7,165 user ratings) in the Rotten Tomatoes database, from a pool of 10,000 movies analyzed. Metacritic gives the film a score of 24 out of 100, based on reviews from 6 critics, indicating "Generally Unfavorable" reviews.

Film historian Leonard Maltin gave the movie a "BOMB" citation—the lowest possible rating in his annual Movie Guide—explaining, "Title is supposed to be short for Radical...as in, 'Radical, man!' Yeah, right...and we didn't see this same plotline used to death by 1950s hot-rod films, and also by 1970s roller-disco epics!"

The film has since gained notoriety as a Cult film. In reporting on the film's 2020 Blu-ray release, The A.V. Club referred to Rad as the "holy grail of '80s cult movies" and noted its "large and loyal cult following." On March 22 and 24, 2026, to celebrate the film's 40th anniversary, Rad played in hundreds of AMC Theaters nationwide. In reporting on this "fifth official celebration of Rad Day," Collider called Rad "The Greatest 1980s Cult Classic Sports Movie."

== Home media ==
The film was released on VHS and LaserDisc in 1986 and became a top-ten video rental for two years.

Rad went more than 30 years without a DVD or Blu-ray release. Its distribution rights had been divided among multiple companies in the 1980s; over time, those rights reverted to executive producer Jack Schwartzman, who was married to Talia Shire until his death in 1994. Their sons, cinematographer John Schwartzman and actor Robert Schwartzman, supervised a 4K restoration using the original negative. Vinegar Syndrome released it in a limited edition 4K UHD/Blu-ray combo pack in May 2020.

The film was released on iTunes on July 24, 2020.

The film has been re-released by Vinegar Syndrome as a special limited edition with a new case and cover

== Soundtrack ==
Music from the Motion Picture Soundtrack - Rad

Soundtrack album by Various
- Released: 1986
- Genres: New Wave, Pop Rock
- Label: Curb Records

The soundtrack was released on 12" vinyl and cassette, by Curb Records in late 1986, and featured various artists including John Farnham in his pre-Whispering Jack days, 3-Speed, Sparks, Hubert Kah and Real Life. On February 9, 2014, it was released for digital download at the iTunes Store. It is also available to stream on Spotify. Farnham's "Break the Ice" was featured on a special list of the best songs from '80s action film montages that appeared on music website No Echo.

US vinyl-LP and cassette track listing

No.	Title	Writer(s)	Performer	Length
1.	"Break the Ice"	S. Shifrin, B. Marlette	John Farnham	3:15
2.	"Riverside"	J. Raney, S. Marshall	The Beat Farmers	3:21
3.	"Wind Me Up"	L. Chase, D. Currier	3-Speed	3:49
4.	"Get Strange"	H. Kemmler, M. Loehr	Hubert Kah	3:06
5.	"Send Me an Angel"	D. Sterry, R. Zatorski	Real Life	3:57
6.	"Music That You Can Dance To"	Ron Mael, Russell Mael	Sparks	4:24
7.	"Baby Come Back"	Eddy Grant	Jimmy Haddox	4:03
8.	"Thunder in Your Heart"	G. Sklerov, L. Macaluso	John Farnham	3:38
9.	"With You (Love Theme from Rad)"	D. Brayfield, J. Di Pasquale	John Farnham	4:00

== See also ==
- List of films about bicycles and cycling
