= Congratulations =

Congratulations may refer to:

== Film and television ==
- Congratulations (2010 film), an Egyptian film
- Congratulations (2023 film), a Gujarati drama film
- Congratulations: 50 Years of the Eurovision Song Contest, 2005 television programme to commemorate its fiftieth anniversary
- "Congratulations" (New Tricks), a 2006 television episode
- "Congratulations" (Scott & Bailey), a 2011 television episode

== Music ==
- Congratulations!, a 1975 Russian opera

=== Albums ===
- Congratulations (album), an album by MGMT
- Congratulations, an album by BZN
- Congratulations, an album by Amy Hart
- Congratulations, an album by Mac Lethal

=== Songs ===
- "Congratulate" (song), by AKA, 2014
- "Congratulations" (Cliff Richard song), 1968
- "Congratulations" (Day6 song), 2015
- "Congratulations" (MGMT song), 2010
- "Congratulations" (Roomie, PewDiePie and Boyinaband song), 2019
- "Congratulations" (Post Malone song), 2016
- "Congratulations" (Silvía Night song), 2006
- "Congratulations" (Traveling Wilburys song), 1988
- "Congratulations" (Vesta song), 1989
- "Gongxi Gongxi", or "Congratulations", a popular Mandarin Chinese song and a Chinese Lunar New Year standard
- "Congratulations", by Alex Lahey from The Answer Is Always Yes, 2023
- "Congratulations", by Blue October from Foiled, 2006
- "Congratulations", by Faron Young from Hello Walls, 1961
- "Congratulations", by Juliana Hatfield from Only Everything, 1995
- "Congratulations", by Mac Miller from The Divine Feminine, 2016
- "Congratulations", by Ne-Yo from Non-Fiction, 2015
- "Congratulations", by Paul Simon from Paul Simon, 1972
- "Congratulations", by Rachel Platten from Wildfire, 2016
- "Congratulations", by The Rolling Stones from 12 X 5, 1964
- "Congratulations", by Simple Plan Harder Than It Looks, 2022
- "Congratulations", by Sleeping with Sirens from Feel, 2013
- "Congratulations", a cut song from the musical Hamilton, later released in The Hamilton Mixtape, 2016

== See also ==
- Congratulations… I'm Sorry, an album by Gin Blossoms
