= When the Lights Go Out =

When the Lights Go Out may refer to:

- When the Lights Go Out (album), a 1988 album by American singer Pia Zadora
- When the Lights Go Out (EP), a 2012 EP by Australian singer Havana Brown
- "When the Lights Go Out" (song), a 1998 song by British boy band Five
- "When the Lights Go Out", a 1983 song by Naked Eyes from the album Burning Bridges
