= Unsaved =

Unsaved may refer to:

- The Unsaved, a Moldovan drama film
- Unsaved, the second album released by American industrial metal band Deadstar Assembly

== See also ==
- Salvation
- Saved game
