= Lee Arnone-Briggs =

American actress

Lee Arnone-Briggs is an American actress with a career spanning nearly forty years in stage, screen, and television productions. In addition to her screen work, she is also a voice actress with several motion picture credits.

Her notable film roles include "Mrs. Lemsky" in Girls Just Want to Have Fun and the Stewardess in The Karate Kid Part II. However, her mostly widely noted film role is for a movie in which she does not appear in the theatrical release—Star Trek: Insurrection. In this film, Arnone-Briggs played a Starfleet librarian on the USS Enterprise-E. The scene was cut from the film version, however, it was included on the Star Trek: Insurrection (Special Edition) DVD release.

Her television credits include appearances on Married... with Children, Night Court, Hunter, Hooperman, Starman, the mid-1980s edition of The Twilight Zone, and The Facts of Life.
