= Happy (Real Life album) =

Studio album by Real Life
- Released: 7 October 1997
- Recorded: 1996–1997; Toyland Studios, World Recording Studios
- Genre: New wave
- Length: 42:59
- Label: Curb Records
- Producer: Real Life

Real Life chronology
Lifetime (1990)	Happy (1997)	Imperfection (2004)

Singles from Happy
- 1. "Deep Sleep" Released: 1996; 2. "Meltdown" Released: 1997

Happy is the fourth studio album by Australian new wave band Real Life. The album was released in October 1997. At the time of release, Real Life consisted of David Sterry, Danny Simcic, Allan Johnson and George Pappas.

A 1999 limited edition release of Happy featured a bonus remix album called Happier.

== Reception ==
Professional ratings
Review scores
Source	Rating
AllMusic	3.5/5 stars

Tomas Mureika from AllMusic said "The cover speaks volumes. The head that looks like a scary, puffy fish is indicative of the [band's] new direction... still very much in the synth pop vein, but now with a dangerous, dark gothic edge" adding "This is a dark, brooding record, but one which would craft the persona of Real Life for the next decade. Still very hook-laden, still very danceable -- but darker, more ominous and definitively more goth."

== Track listing ==
No.	Title	Writer(s)	Length
1.	"Everything Explodes"	David Sterry	4:55
2.	"Virus"	Sterry, George Pappas	4:19
3.	"I Did What I Did"	Sterry, Pappas	3:26
4.	"Happy"	Sterry, Pappas	4:49
5.	"Girl Jesus"	Sterry, Danny Simcic	3:41
6.	"Satisfied"	Sterry, Simcic	3:31
7.	"Skin"	Sterry, Pappas	4:02
8.	"Deep Sleep"	Sterry	3:46
9.	"Learning How to Breath"	Sterry, Pappas	3:33
10.	"Meltdown"	Sterry, Simcic	5:56
11.	"Deep Sleep" (Momentum Dance Mix)	Sterry	7:37
12.	"Meltdown" (radio edit)	Sterry, Simcic	3:37

1999 "Happier" Bonus CD
No.	Title	Length
1.	"Everything Explodes" (Pre War Mix)	1:16
2.	"Virus" (Millennium Metal Mix)	3:36
3.	"Happy" (Rebel Without a Cause Mix)	4:51
4.	"Satisfied" (Denial Mix)	4:31
5.	"Girl Jesus" (World Club Mix)	6:42
6.	"Meldtown" (Insomnia Mix)	4:45
7.	"Skin" (Out of Body Mix)	4:43
8.	"Deep Sleep" (Momentum Dance Mix)	7:34
9.	"Meltdown" (Machine Mix)	4:18
10.	"I Did What I Did" (911 Mix)	4:49
11.	"Deep Sleep" (Terraplane Mix)	3:55
12.	"Learning How to Breathe" (East of Eden Mix)	4:46

== Release history ==
Country	Date	Format	Label	Catalogue
United States of America	1997	CD	Momentum Record	MOM1001
Australia	1998	CD	Blah Blah Blah	BBB0072
Australia	1999	2xCD	Blah Blah Blah	BBB0072
