= Pia Z =

Studio album by Pia Zadora
- Released: 1989
- Studio: Tarpan, San Rafael, California; Record Plant, Sausalito
- Label: CBS Associated
- Producer: Narada Michael Walden

Pia Zadora chronology
| When the Lights Go Out (1988) | Pia Z (1989) | Pia Today! (1989) |

Pia Z is a studio album by the American singer-actress Pia Zadora, released in 1989. It was produced by Narada Michael Walden. Zadora supported the album with a North American tour.

"Heartbeat of Love" was released as the first single. "If You Were Mine" was issued as a promotional single only, and included "I Wanna Be Your Woman" as the second track. "If You Were Mine" was a modest adult contemporary hit.

== Critical reception ==
Professional ratings
Review scores
| Source | Rating |
|---|---|
| AllMusic | 3/5 stars |

The Washington Post wrote that Zadora "has a credible and adaptable if lightweight voice, but in her naked appeal for popularity, she doesn't sound like anyone so much as she sounds like everyone."

== Track listing ==
All tracks composed by Liz Jackson and Narada Michael Walden; except where indicated

1. "Heartbeat of Love"
2. "I Wanna Be Your Woman" (Sally Jo Dakota, Narada Michael Walden)
3. "Keep Me Inside Your Love"
4. "You Made Me Want You"
5. "Slam It" (Gigi Gonaway, Kevin Walden, Narada Michael Walden)
6. "Eternally" (Jeffrey Cohen, Narada Michael Walden)
7. "If You Were Mine"
8. "I Am What I Am"
9. "Floating Hearts" (Corrado Rustici, Jeffrey Cohen, Narada Michael Walden)
10. "Kady" (Pia Zadora, Liz Jackson, Narada Michael Walden)
