= When the Rain Begins to Fall =

Single by Pia Zadora and Jermaine Jackson

Single by Jermaine Jackson and Pia Zadora

from the album Voyage of the Rock Aliens and Jermaine Jackson
- B-side: "Follow My Heartbeat"
- Released: July 13, 1984
- Genre: Synth-pop; Eurodisco
- Length: 4:06
- Label: Arista
- Songwriters: Peggy March; Michael Bradley; Steve Wittmack
- Producer: Jack White

Jermaine Jackson singles chronology
"Do What You Do" (1984)	"When the Rain Begins to Fall" (1984)	"(Closest Thing To) Perfect" (1985)

Pia Zadora singles chronology
"The Clapping Song" (1983)	"When the Rain Begins to Fall" (1985)	"Let's Dance Tonight" (1985)

Music video
- "When the Rain Begins to Fall" on YouTube

"When the Rain Begins to Fall" is a song written and composed by Peggy March, Michael Bradley, and Steve Wittmack, recorded by singers Jermaine Jackson and Pia Zadora, and released on July 13, 1984. The song was performed in the movie Voyage of the Rock Aliens, in which Zadora played a lead role. The film's opening musical sequence features the official music video for the song. Filmed in Sperlonga, Italy, the music video portrays Jackson and Zadora as star-crossed lovers belonging to rival biker gangs. Before being released in the US, "When the Rain Begins to Fall" went to number one in several European countries. The song failed to capitalize on its European success in America, but did better on the US dance charts, reaching number 22. In 2022, a K-pop cover version of the song was recorded by PSY and Hwasa.

== Track listing ==
- 12-inch single
1. "When the Rain Begins to Fall" (extended version) – 6:07
2. "Follow My Heartbeat" by Pia Zadora – 4:22
3. "Escape from the Planet of the Ant Men" (by Jermaine Jackson feat. T. Jackson and R. Jackson) – 5:04
- 7-inch single
1. "When the Rain Begins to Fall" – 4:06
2. "Follow My Heartbeat" (by Pia Zadora) – 4:22

== Charts ==
Chart (1985)	Peak position
Australia (Kent Music Report)	63
Austria (Ö3 Austria Top 40)	2
Belgium (Ultratop 50 Flanders)	1
Canada Top Singles (RPM)	42
France (SNEP)	1
Netherlands (Single Top 100)	1
New Zealand (Recorded Music NZ)	15
Switzerland (Schweizer Hitparade)	1
UK Singles (Official Charts)	68
US Billboard Hot 100	54
US Hot R&B/Hip-Hop Songs (Billboard)	61
US Dance Club Songs (Billboard)	22
West Germany (GfK)	1

Chart (2025)	Peak position
Poland (Polish Airplay Top 100)	69

== Certifications ==
Region	Certification	Certified units/sales
France (SNEP)	Platinum	1,000,000^{*}
Netherlands (NVPI)	Platinum	100,000^{^}
^{*} Sales figures based on certification alone.^{^} Shipments figures based on certification alone.

== Pappa Bear feat. Van der Toorn version ==
"When the Rain Begins to Fall"

Single by Pappa Bear feat. Van der Toorn

from the album What's My Name?
- Released: March 30, 1998
- Length: 3:56
- Label: Universal
- Songwriters: Peggy March, Michael Bradley, Steve Wittmack
- Producers: Bülent Aris, Toni Cottura

Pappa Bear singles chronology
"Cherish" (1997)	"When the Rain Begins to Fall" (1998)

In 1998, the song was covered by Pappa Bear feat. Van der Toorn.

=== Track listing ===
CD maxi

1. "When the Rain Begins to Fall" (radio edit) – 3:56
2. "Brotherhood" – 4:21
3. "Like This" – 3:24

=== Charts ===
Weekly charts

Chart (1998)	Peak position
Australia (ARIA)	50
Austria (Ö3 Austria Top 40)	6
Germany (GfK)	9
Netherlands (Dutch Top 40)	15
Netherlands (Single Top 100)	21
New Zealand (Recorded Music NZ)	4
Sweden (Sverigetopplistan)	56
Switzerland (Schweizer Hitparade)	16

Year-end charts

Chart (1998)	Position
Germany (Media Control)	65
New Zealand (RIANZ)	24

== Desperado feat. Pál Tamás cover ==
"A csillagokban járunk"

Single by Desperado feat. Pál Tamás

from the album Táncolj!
- Released: February 20, 2007
- Length: 4:06
- Label: Sony BMG Entertainment
- Songwriters: Peggy March; Michael Bradley; Steve Wittmack

Desperado singles chronology
"Táncolj!" (2006)	"A csillagokban járunk" (2007)	"Kerek az élet" (2007)

In 2007, the song was covered by Hungarian band Desperado featuring singer Tamás Pál.

=== Track listing ===
CD maxi

1. "A csillagokban járunk" (Radio Edit) – 3:56
2. "A csillagokban járunk" (Spy the Ghost Mix) – 6:24
3. "A csillagokban járunk" (Peat Jr. & Fernando Club Traxx) – 6:03
4. "A csillagokban járunk" (Dj Páz Italo Club Mix) – 5:41

=== Charts ===
Chart (2007)	Peak position
Hungary (Rádiós Top 40)	7
Hungary (Single Top 40)	8
Hungary (Dance Top 40)	28

== See also ==
- List of Dutch Top 40 number-one singles of 1984
- List of number-one hits of 1984 (Germany)
- List of number-one hits of 1984 (Switzerland)
- List of number-one hits of 1985 (France)
