= Bill Allen (actor) =

American actor

- Born: William Lawrence Allen; November 7, 1962 (age 63); Wichita, Kansas, U.S.
- Occupation: Actor
- Years active: 1977–present

William Lawrence Allen (born November 7, 1962) is an American actor.

Allen was born in Wichita, Kansas. He became famous for his role in the 1986 film Rad as BMX racer Cru Jones. Among other roles, William appeared as Roger Sloate in the 1987 Family Ties television episode "Matchmaker". Bill has toured extensively for the band The Pipefitters with his harmonica, alongside actor Lou Diamond Phillips.

== Filmography ==
Film
Year	Film	Role	Other notes			
1977	The Ransom	Carson (the butler)				
1983	Streamers	Lt. Townsend				
1986	Rad	Christopher "Cru" Jones				
1989	Born on the Fourth of July	Platoon				
1991	Hard Time Romance					
1994	Sioux City	Dan Larkin		Monsterpiece Theatre Volume 1	Tucker	Segment: The Weed
2009	The Quiet Ones	The Priest				
2015	Heroes of Dirt	Tim Cooper				
Television
Year	Title	Role	Notes			
1985	Hotel	Alex	Episode: Passports			
1985	Amazing Stories	Cliff Ratte	Episode: The Main Attraction			
1987	Outlaws	Mark	Episode: Primer			
1987	Ohara	Terry	Episode: Terry			
1987	Family Ties	Roger Sloate	Episode: Matchmaker			
1988	A Stoning in Fulham County	Roy	NBC TV-Movie			
1989	China Beach	Blevins	Episode: Promised Land			
1989	Alien Nation	Ruthra	Episode: The Game			
2010	Tosh.0	Self	Cameo			
