= High Energy (Evelyn Thomas song) =

Single by Evelyn Thomas

from the album High Energy
- Released: April 1984
- Studio: Trident (London, England)
- Genre: Hi-NRG
- Length: 3:48
- Label: TRS
- Songwriters: Ian Levine; Fiachra Trench
- Producers: Ian Levine; Fiachra Trench

Evelyn Thomas singles chronology
"Doomsday" (1976)	"High Energy" (1984)	"Masquerade" (1984)

"High Energy" is a song co-written and co-produced by Ian Levine and Fiachra Trench and performed by American singer Evelyn Thomas. The song was popular in dance clubs around the world, topping the US Billboard Dance/Disco Top 80 in September 1984. It also spent four weeks at number one in West Germany peaked at number five in the United Kingdom. It became one of the earliest successful songs within the genre of music that has come to be known as hi-NRG. On the SoBe Music compilation album Gay Classics, Volume 1: Ridin' the Rainbow, the liner notes describe the song as "...engagingly captur[ing] the spirit of the genre through uplifting lyrics tightly fused with dazzling synth work".

== Music video ==
There are two different videos versions of the song. The original featured Thomas standing on a platform performing the song while everyone around her is dancing. The second, which was done for the American syndicated series New York Hot Tracks, featured Thomas with a different set of dancers that was filmed at a New York City nightclub, with two dancers acting out the song’s lyrics.

== Impact and legacy ==
To 2015, the song has been extensively reinterpreted through extended mixes and re-recordings. This includes the single "Lifting Me Higher", by duo Gems for Jem, which sampled "High Energy" and topped the UK Dance Chart in May 1995. In 2022, American magazine Rolling Stone ranked "High Energy" number 177 in their list of the "200 Greatest Dance Songs of All Time".

== Track listings ==
- 7-inch single
1. "High Energy" – 3:48
2. "High Energy" (instrumental dub) – 3:30
- 12-inch maxi
1. "High Energy" (vocal) – 7:50
2. "High Energy" (instrumental dub) – 7:28

== Charts ==
=== Weekly charts ===
Chart (1984)	Peak position
Australia (Kent Music Report)	98
Austria (Ö3 Austria Top 40)	5
Belgium (Ultratop 50 Flanders)	7
Canada Top Singles (RPM)	50
Denmark (Hitlisten)	3
Europe (European Hot 100 Singles)	3
France (SNEP)	18
Ireland (IRMA)	12
Netherlands (Dutch Top 40)	3
Netherlands (Single Top 100)	8
Norway (VG-lista)	9
Spain (AFYVE)	1
Switzerland (Schweizer Hitparade)	3
UK Singles (Official Charts)	5
US Billboard Hot 100	85
US Dance/Disco Top 80 (Billboard)	1
West Germany (GfK)	1

=== Year-end charts ===
Chart (1984)	Position
Belgium (Ultratop 50 Flanders)	11
Netherlands (Dutch Top 40)	38
Netherlands (Single Top 100)	87
West Germany (Media Control)	9

== See also ==
- List of number-one dance hits (United States)
- Number-one hits of 1984 (Germany)
