= Deadstar Assembly =

American industrial metal band

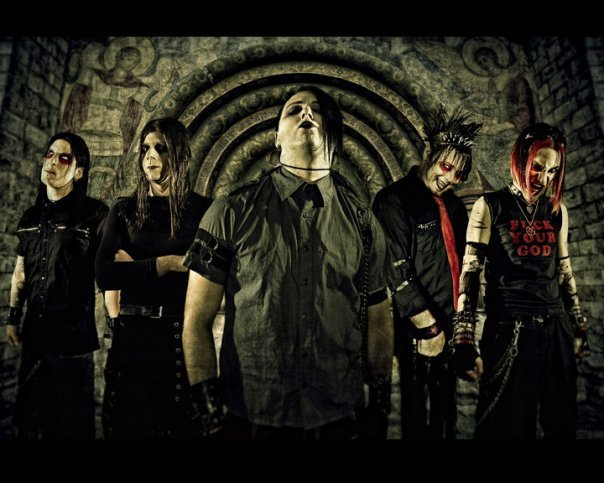

Background information
- Also known as: DSA
- Origin: Fort Lauderdale, Florida, U.S.
- Genres: Industrial metal, industrial rock
- Years active: 2001–present
- Labels: Pure, Dockyard1, Somatic, Spiralchords
- Members: Dearborn; The Dro; DreGGs; Kriz D.K. Mubo
- Past members: Jay sKuz; Cygnus
- Website: deadstar.com

Deadstar Assembly is an American industrial rock/metal band formed in 2001 in Fort Lauderdale, Florida.

== History ==
=== 2001–2006 ===
Deadstar Assembly formed in 2001 from a collaboration between Dearborn and techno producer Luis Duran. They recruited MuBo (ex-Basic Humans) to play keyboards. Realizing they shared a common creative vision, MuBo and Dearborn partnered to assemble the remaining pieces of the band – The Dro (ex-DeSaad) and Cygnus (ex-The C60's)

On March 30, 2002, the band performed their debut show at the Culture Room in Ft. Lauderdale, FL. Original guitarist and Dearborn's high school friend Jay was dismissed from the group later that year and was replaced by DreGGs, a graduate of the Art Institute of Fort Lauderdale.

==== Deadstar Assembly ====
Their self-titled debut album contained 13 tracks, one of which was a cover of the 1980s pop hit, Send Me An Angel (originally by Real Life). In 2004 David Sterry of Real Life contacted the band and personally endorsed their version of his song. DeadStar Assembly went on to sell over 15,000 copies independently.

==== The Dark Hole Sessions: Vol. 1 ====
In 2003, the band released their debut DVD entitled "The Dark Hole Sessions: Vol.1" nationwide, which was a collection of various tour and behind the scenes videos that the band had archived during their first two years together.

Between 2004 and 2006 the band did extensive touring to support these releases opening for bands such as Bella Morte, Crossbreed, Celldweller, Genitorturers, The Birthday Massacre, and Wednesday 13.

While touring with Wednesday 13, the band started writing for their next album which at the time was slated for a 2004 release. DeadStar Assembly was endorsed by B.C. Rich Guitars and Kustom Amplification during their visit to NAMM in 2005.

=== 2006–2008 ===
==== Unsaved ====
Their second album Unsaved was produced by DSA themselves and Jeremy Staska. Their sophomore effort is a much more personal album and was mastered by Grammy nominated Adam Ayan at Bob Ludwig's Gateway Mastering in Portland, Maine. It was released on July 11, 2006, by Pure Records Sony/Red & Fontana/Universal Distribution, with an international release on April 28, 2006, via German based The A Label which would later have the album reissued by Dockyard1.

Unsaved was the first album to be recorded and influenced by current band members. MuBo notably was released before the North American debut of Unsaved, leaving the band without a touring keyboardist. With the departure of MuBo, a new space was left open and it wasn't until the Unsaved release party at The Culture Room in Fort Lauderdale, Florida that sKuz was introduced as his replacement. "Killing Myself Again" would be the debut video from "Unsaved" which was directed and edited by Rey "Darkhak" Gutierrez.

==== The Dark Hole Sessions: Vol. 2 ====
On February 26, 2008, the sequel to their first DVD was released entitled "The Dark Hole Sessions: Vol. 2". Like their first DVD, it was a robust compilation of live performances, pre and post show antics along with video logs from their extensive tours and studio sessions.

The track, "Undone" (from their self-titled debut album), appears as "All You Ever Wanted" on the soundtrack for Project Gotham Racing 3 as well as the song "I'm Just Like You" (from the same album) in the soundtrack to the 2008 film Picture This. The band's music has also been heard in various TV shows including MTVs Punk'd episode No. 301, MTVs Making The Video – Goo Goo Dolls, and MTV's NEXT.

=== 2008–present ===
==== Coat of Arms ====
On January 10, 2009, the group made an announcement regarding the departure of drummer Cygnus and the addition of his replacement, Kriz D.K., via a video posted on the band's official Myspace page and YouTube.

The Follow-up to 2006's "Unsaved", "Coat Of Arms" will be the 3rd major release by Deadstar Assembly.

In December 2008 it was announced by both Mubo and Deadstar Assembly through Myspace that the former keyboardist had contributed parts to a remake of their hit song "Breathe For Me". In May 2009, the band posted a song, "In Secrecy", off of the upcoming "Coat Of Arms" album. The track listing for the album was also released online and covered in the December/January issue of Germany's Zillo Magazine.

In September 2009 Mubo joined the band for a special performance at the State Theater in St. Petersburg, FL for Crossbreed's CD Release Party. It was the first time in over 3 years since Mubo had performed onstage with DeadStar Assembly. In December 2009 it was announced that Mubo was back in the band.

"Coat Of Arms" was produced by DeadStar Assembly & Jeremy Staska with executive producer credit going to Luis Duran. The album was released April 13, 2010, in North America exclusively at Hot Topic stores & iTunes nationwide. "Coat Of Arms" is scheduled to see its European debut on May 7, 2010, via Berlin's Spiralchords Music / Alive Distribution.

Deadstar Assembly were invited to perform at the Summerbreeze Festival August 20, 2010, in Dinkeslbuhl, Germany alongside acts such as GWAR, The 69 Eyes, Gorgoroth, The Black Dahlia Murder, Subway To Sally, Cannibal Corpse, Eisbrecher, Leaves Eyes and many others. DSA Performed Day 3 on the Pain Stage. The band returned to the United States to perform the Triton Festival at Oceana Hall in Brooklyn, NY. The three-day festival featured Celldweler, Clan Of Xymox, Icon Of Coil, Apoptygma Bezerk and many others.

On October 12, 2010, the band reissued their 2006 release "Unsaved" as a bonus tracks version which featured new unreleased remixes "Killing Myself Again (Dreggs Mix)" and "Deathwish (Skurge Mix)".

Deadstar Assembly released a video online for "The Darkest Star" on Halloween 2010.

The band wrote and recorded its fourth album for a 2015 release, entitled "Blame it on the Devil".

== Current band members ==
- Dearborn – lead vocals (2001–present)
- The Dro – bass, backing vocals (2001–present)
- DreGGs – guitars, backing vocals (2002–present)
- Kriz D. K. - drums (2008–present)
- Mubo – keyboards, backing vocals (2001–2006, 2009–present)

=== Former band members ===
- Jay – guitars, backing vocals (2001–2002)
- sKuz – keyboards, backing vocals (2006–2008)
- Cygnus – drums (2001–2008, 2017)

== Media coverage ==
- DSA Interviewed for "Zillo" Magazine.
- DSA DVD Review and Artist Review for "Zillo" Magazine.
- DSA Review for "Metal Hammer" Magazine.
- Deadstar Assembly Interview for "Rim Frost" Magazine.
- Deadstar Assembly Review in "Rim Frost" Magazine.
- DSA Review in "Virus! Music" Magazine.
- Deadstar Assembly Interview for "De-Evolution" Magazine.
- Interview with "Orkus" Magazine.
- Interview with "Caustic Truths" Magazine.
- Kriz D.K. Interview for VolumeOne Magazine.
- Article about the band in "New Times".
- Writeup about Deadstar Assembly on fearnet.com.
- Two Page Article in "Sonic Seducer" Magazine.
- DSA Listed in "The Official Heavy Metal Book Of Lists".
- DSA Listed as influence for the book "The 9th Day" as noted in the forward.
- Writeup in "R.A.G." Magazine.
- Announcement of DSA's Inclusion in RAGfest 2 (as seen on the cover).
- Review of DSA performance from RAGfest 2.

=== List of current endorsements ===
- Schecter Guitar Research (The Dro, Dearborn, Dreggs)
- Kustom Amplification (The Dro, Dearborn, DreGGs)
- Dean Markley Strings
- ddrum
- Korg
- Vic Firth
- Jägermeister
- TRX cymbals
- Hot Picks USA
- Zzyzx Snap Jack cables
- Travel Wellness

=== List of past endorsements ===
- B.C. Rich guitars (The Dro, Dearborn)

== Discography ==
=== Studio albums ===
- Deadstar Assembly (2002)
- Unsaved (2006)
- Coat of Arms (2010)
- Unsaved (Bonus Tracks Version) (2010)
- Blame It On The Devil (2015)

=== Singles ===
- Send Me An Angel (2002)
- Breathe For Me (2003)
- Dejected (2006)
- Killing Myself Again (2006)
- In Secrecy (2009)
- The Darkest Star (2010)
- Amulet (2015)

=== DVDs ===
- Dark Hole Sessions – Vol. 1 (2003)
- Dark Hole Sessions – Vol. 2 (2008)

=== Music videos ===
- Send Me An Angel (2003)
- Breathe For Me (2004)
- Killing Myself Again (2006)
- Dejected (2007)
- The Darkest Star (2010)

=== Soundtracks ===
- Project Gotham Racing 3
- DSA Featured on the soundtrack to ABC Family's film Picture This.
- DSA Featured on MTVs Punk'd Episode 301.
- MTVs Making The Video – Goo Goo Dolls
- MTVs NEXT
- DSA's Music Featured on the Intro clips to the Face Off (TV series), Also in TV Commercial Trailers for the show.
