= Jimmy & the Mustangs =

American rockabilly band

Jimmy and the Mustangs
- Genre: Rockabilly
- Years active: 1979–present
- Labels: Vanity Records, Nervie Record, Curb Records
- Members: Jimmy Haddox
- Past members: Marshall Rohner; Jeff Cranford; Troy Mack; Spyder Mittleman; Pat Woodward; Bryan Spainhower; Mark Youngersmith; Danny B. Harvey; Paul Soliz; Vance Hazen; Jeff Brown; Mike Lewis; Howard Parker; Johnny Bartel; Dave Bartel; Jerry Sikorski; Charlie Quintana; Gene Taylor; Mark Walsdorf; Jon Nicoles; John Kelly; Dylan Cavaliere
- Website: Official website

Jimmy and the Mustangs is an American rockabilly band fronted by Jimmy Haddox (sometimes credited as Jimmy Silvers). Emerging from the punk scene in Southern California during the 1980s, Jimmy and the Mustangs played their first live show opening for The Go-Go's. At the time, the band’s "root’s music" was fueled by fury-driven, gut-wrenching guitars, not unlike their punk contenders of that era. As the band progressed, a more definitive sound began to evolve, and Jimmy and the Mustangs carved out a style of rockabilly and swing unlike any other band in Los Angeles at the time. World-famous Hollywood nightclubs like The Whiskey, The Roxy and The Starwood began booking Jimmy and the Mustangs as an opening act for L.A. bands such as X, The Blasters and Los Lobos as well as touring bands such as Chuck Berry, The Stray Cats and Joe Ely, just to name a few. It wasn’t long before Jimmy and the Mustangs were headlining the same clubs with sold-out shows of their own.

In a 1982 Los Angeles Times review of their sold-out Roxy show "filled with quiff-headed rocking cats and their petticoated kittens", the group was described as "not just a band. The Roxy show featured a full-scale production number, complete with guest musicians, guest singers" and others.

Not long after being hired by Robert Plant of Led Zeppelin fame to perform at his own private party, the band was sought out by Bruce Springsteen, who joined them onstage. An East Coast tour followed. Upon returning home to L.A., the band received its first record deal with Vanity Records, which sold an excess of 40,000 copies. Television and movie appearances followed including an appearance in the final episode of the CBS television series Square Pegs in 1983. A self-titled E.P. was released on the Curb/MCA label and included the song "Justine", which was made into a video and received play on MTV. Since relocating to Austin Texas, Jimmy has recorded a self-titled CD and has put together a new Mustangs line-up.

== Discography ==
- Hey Little Girl (1982)
- Jimmy and the Mustangs EP (1984)
- Voyage of the Rock Aliens: Original Motion Picture Soundtrack (1984)
- Rad: Original Motion Picture Soundtrack (1986) (Jimmy Haddox solo)
- Jimmy and the Mustangs (2011) (featuring Danny B. Harvey, Vance Hazen and Paul Soliz)
- Another Round (2015)
