= Michael Bradley (singer) =

American musician

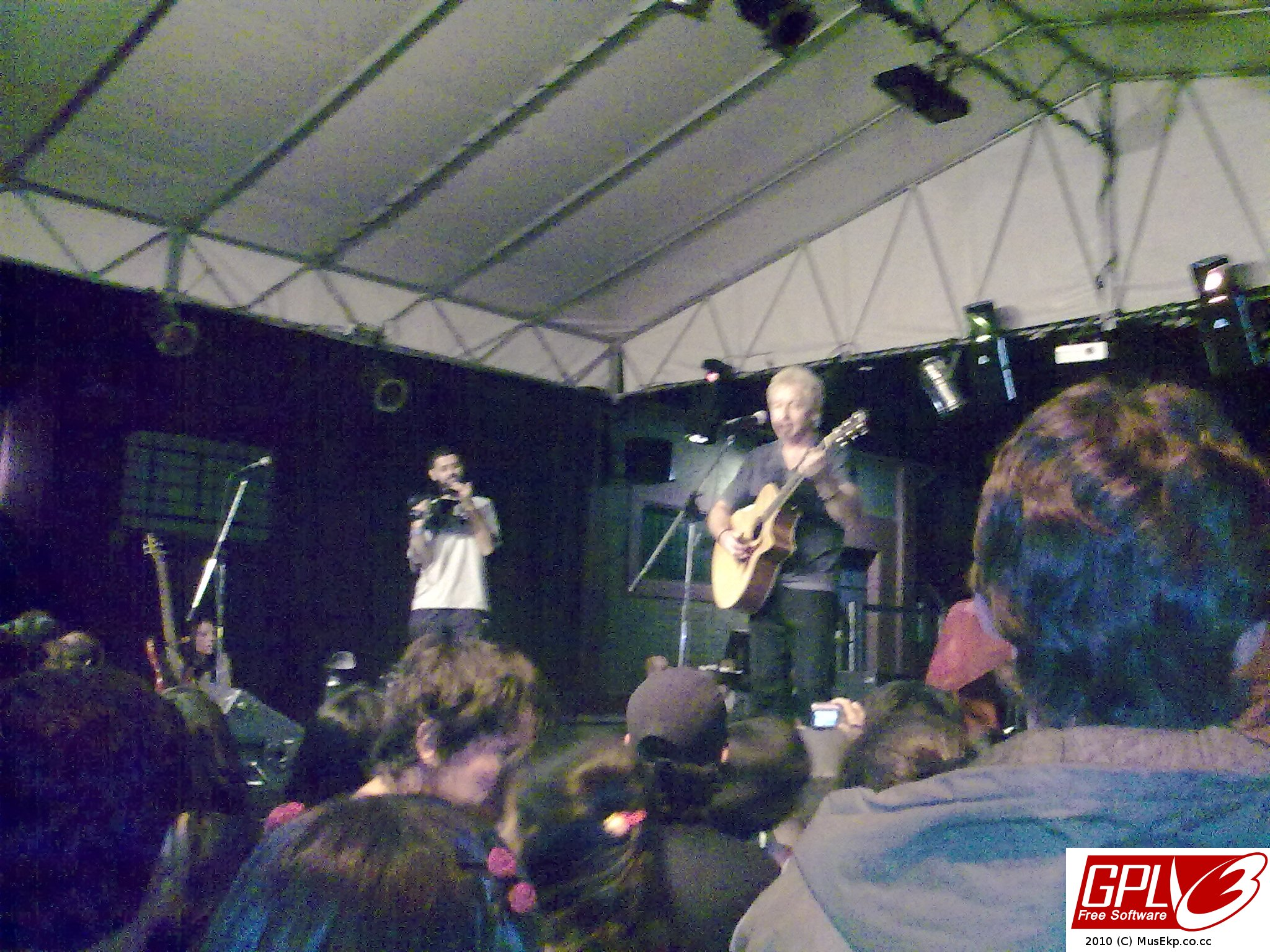
Michael Bradley, closing the "Robotech's 25 years Tour", Paraguay.

Michael Bradley (born March 20, 1951) is a former lead singer for the American rock band Paul Revere & the Raiders. He is also known among anime fans as a composer and singer for Robotech.

== Biography ==
Michael Bradley is best known to anime fans as one of the composer/songwriters of Robotech and the singing voice of the character Lancer / Yellow Dancer. Although mainly known in the music industry as a gold and platinum record award-winning songwriter, he has also gained acclaim as a singer, record producer, composer, guitarist and keyboard player.

Michael was formerly a lead singer of Paul Revere and the Raiders; and he was also a guitarist for Las Vegas headliner, Lola Falana.

In July 2026, Bradley was identified as the singer of a popular lostwave song that had been circulating the web called Somewhere in the Night. The song was a demo produced by Jerry Deaton and written by Deaton and Mark Leggett.

== Discography ==
- The Heart of Us All (SRO/Alcyon Records)
- Kazanova (Monkeyshine International)
- Lonely Soldier Boy (Michael Bradley Music)
- Lonely Soldier Boy II ~ An Acoustic Album (Michael Bradley Music)
- Looking For Shelter (with Mark Lindsay)
- Paul Revere and the Raiders: Special Edition (America Records)
- Robotech The Movie: Underground (Carrere Records)
- Savage Streets Original Motion Picture Soundtrack (MCA / Curb Records)
- Stone Disco (Radio Records)
- Spats (GoodSounds/TK Records)
- Thicke Hawkins (Monkeyshine International)
- When The Rain Begins To Fall (Arista Records)

== Filmography ==
- Dracula (animated) - (main theme)
- Fame (TV series) - (composer) (vocal tracks) Wrote music and lyrics for the network series including A Place Where We Belong which was used as a feature performance
- Lensman: Power of the Lens - (additional music)
- Lensman: Secret of the Lens - (additional music)
- Parental Control (MTV series) - (composer)
- Robotech (TV series) - (vocal tracks) Wrote and produced original songs and background music for the worldwide syndicated animated series. Also was the singing voice for featured character Lancer/Yellow Dancer
- Robotech The Movie - (vocal tracks) Wrote and co-wrote music and lyrics, arranged and produced six songs plus background music
- Robotech II: The Sentinels - (composer)
- Run For Your Life (animated) - (main theme)
- Savage Streets (feature film starring Linda Blair) - (composer, vocal tracks) Co-wrote music and lyrics, produced and performed the songs Killer and In The Night
- Voyage of the Rock Aliens (feature film starring Ruth Gordon and Pia Zadora) - (composer, vocal tracks) Co-wrote the featured worldwide number one hit When the Rain Begins to Fall and sang lead vocals on another featured song, Nature of the Beast
- The Young Eleven (animated) - (main theme)

== Robotech - Yellow Dancer ==
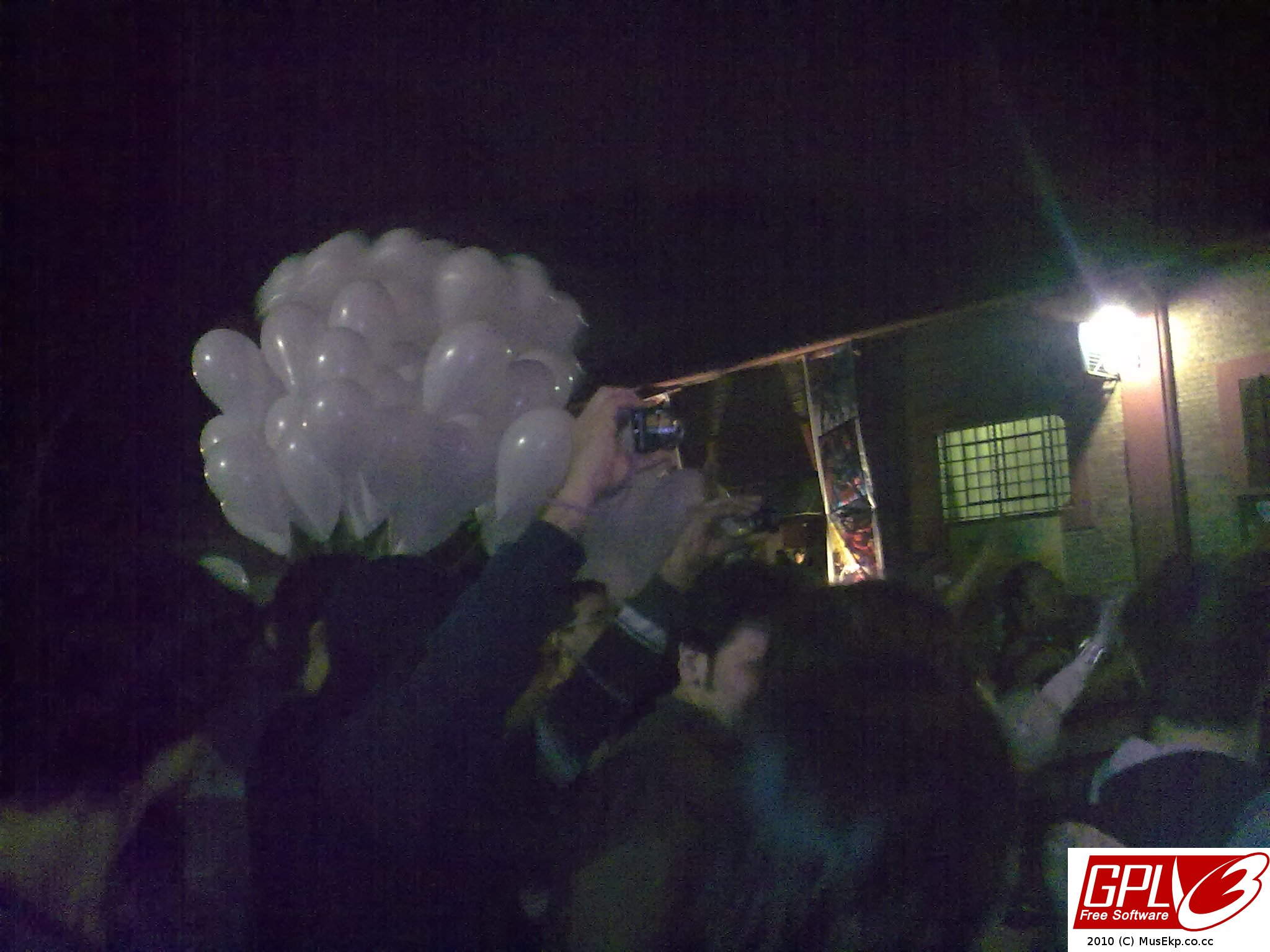
Dramatization of scene in the 65 episode-'Curtain Call', where Yellow Dancer concert is a distraction to steal protuculture. Robotech 25 years tour, Paraguay

"

In the spring of 1985, my songwriting partner Steve Wittmack and I walked into the offices of Harmony Gold on Sunset Blvd. and were hired to write a song called Flower of Life. It was to be a featured song on the television show, Robotech . This was the beginning of many songs that we would be called upon to write for this groundbreaking animated series that would eventually be seen by millions of fans around the world.

I became the singing voice of the character Lancer/Yellow Dancer, who was featured in The New Generation."

~ Michael Bradley Lonely Soldier Boy CD liner notes
