= Evelyn Thomas =

American singer (1953–2024)

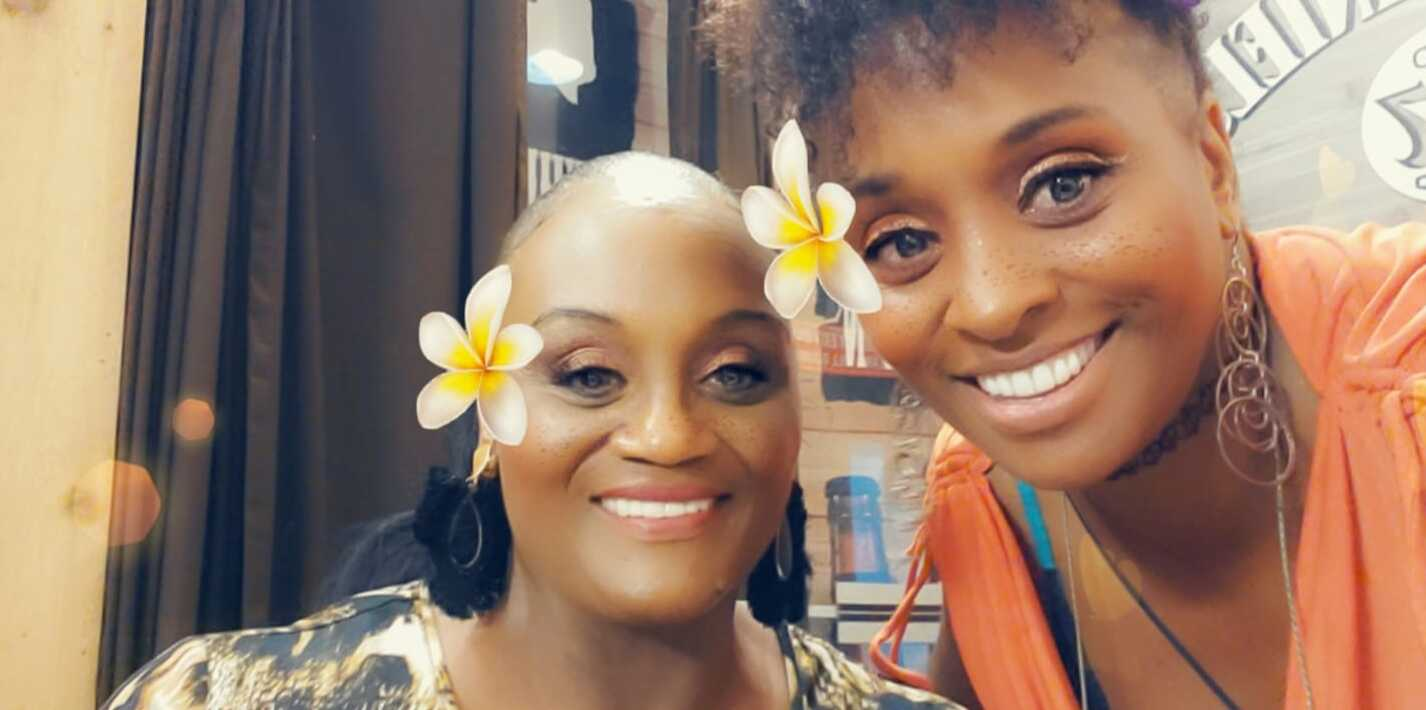
- Thomas with daughter Yaya Diamond in 2023

Background information
- Born: Ellen Lucille Thomas; August 22, 1953; Chicago, Illinois, U.S.
- Died: July 21, 2024 (aged 70)
- Genres: Hi-NRG, disco
- Occupation: Singer
- Instrument: Vocals
- Years active: 1976–2024
- Labels: 20th Century, Casablanca Records, TSR

Ellen Lucille "Evelyn" Thomas (August 22, 1953 – July 21, 2024) was an American singer from Chicago, Illinois, best known for the hi-NRG dance hits "High Energy", "Masquerade", "Standing at the Crossroads", "Reflections", and "Weak Spot".

== Life and career ==
Thomas was born in Chicago, Illinois on August 22, 1953. Although best known worldwide for her 1980s hi-NRG club hits, Thomas recorded and performed disco, Eurobeat, R&B, and dance music songs in the 1980s. She was discovered by British producer Ian Levine, who was in the United States in 1975 scouting for gospel and soul singers he could promote in the UK. The two recorded several tracks which resulted in a contract with 20th Century Records.

Thomas scored a chart hit with her first single, reaching the UK top 30 in 1976 with the single "Weak Spot", co-written by Levine and Paul David Wilson. A follow-up single, "Doomsday", entered the UK charts twice, and Levine and Thomas would continue their association for quite some time. She signed to US label Casablanca Records for her first album release, I Wanna Make It on My Own, released in 1978. With Casablanca doing little to promote the LP, she switched to AVI Records for the double A-side 12-inch single "Have a Little Faith in Me" / "No Time to Turn Around" which prompted the label to release it as an LP, backed with Rick Gianatos' extended remixes of her 1976 tracks "My Head's in the Stars" and "Love's Not Just an Illusion".

By 1984, Levine had re-established himself as a producer and asked Thomas to come to London to record a new track "High Energy". Just a few weeks after it was released, it became a chart hit in Europe, peaking at number one in Germany and at number five in the UK. The song was her only Billboard Hot 100 entry, peaking at number 85, although three additional songs hit the Billboard dance chart.

The follow-up single, "Masquerade", was taken from her third album, High Energy, released the same year. While it received heavy rotation in European clubs, it failed to break into the UK top 40. Later in the year, "Heartless" became her only single other than "High Energy" to chart outside of the dance charts in the US. "Heartless" peaked at number 84 on the Black Singles chart (later renamed the Hot R&B/Hip-Hop Singles & Tracks chart) in 1985.

Though she would not return to the US pop or R&B charts, she had a dance chart hit with a cover of the Supremes' 1967 song "Reflections", peaking at number 18 on the Hot Dance Music/Club Play chart in early 1986. A second Thomas release that summer fared even better on the dance charts, with "How Many Hearts" narrowly missing the top 10, peaking at number 11. The two songs would later appear on Thomas' fourth album release, Standing at the Crossroads, in 1986.

In 2009, Thomas and three others formed an entertainment company, called Eljopan Entertainment Incorporated.

Thomas died on July 21, 2024, at the age of 70. Her death was acknowledged by Levine who premiered a posthumous song, "Out with the Old", in her honour on August 1, 2024. People reported that Thomas's daughter Kimberly, a vocalist who performs as YaYa Diamond, intended to record one of Thomas's unreleased songs as a tribute to her life and legacy.

== Discography ==
=== Studio albums ===
- I Wanna Make It on My Own (Casablanca Records, 1978)
- Have a Little Faith in Me (AVI Records, 1979)
- High Energy (Record Shack, 1984)
- Standing at the Crossroads (Record Shack, 1986)

=== Compilation albums ===
- The Best of Evelyn Thomas (Hot Productions, 1991)
- High Energy: The Best of Evelyn Thomas (Hallmark, 2000)

=== Singles ===
Year	Single	Peak chart positions				
Year	Single	US Dance	US R&B	US Pop	GER	UK
1976	"Weak Spot"	—	—	—	―	26
1976	"Doomsday"	—	—	—	―	41
1976	"Love's Not Just an Illusion"	―	—	―	—	―
1977	"My Head's in the Stars"	―	―	―	—	―
1978	"Thanks for Being There"	—	—	―	—	―
1979	"Have a Little Faith in Me"	—	—	―	—	―
1984	"High Energy"	1	—	85	1	5
1984	"Masquerade"	―	—	—	33	60
1984	"Heartless"	―	84	—	―	95
1985	"Sorry Wrong Number"	―	—	—	―	100
1985	"Cold Shoulder"	―	—	—	―	81
1985	"Reflections"	18	―	―	—	―
1986	"How Many Hearts"	11	—	―	—	―
1986	"Tightrope"	―	―	―	—	―
1987	"Standing at the Crossroads"	―	―	―	—	―
1987	"No Win Situation"	―	—	―	—	―
1987	"Summer on the Beach"	―	―	―	—	―
1987	"High Voltage"	―	―	―	—	―
1988	"Only Once in a Lifetime"	―	—	―	—	―
1988	"Sleaze"	―	―	―	—	―
1989	"This Is Madness"	―	—	―	—	―
1993	"Move Your Body"	―	—	―	—	―
1994	"One World"	―	—	―	—	―
1998	"Please Don't Let Me Go"	―	—	—	—	―
2008	"Stick to the Plan"	―	—	―	—	―
"—" denotes releases that did not chart or were not released in that territory.

== See also ==
- List of artists who reached number one on the U.S. Dance Club Songs chart
- Soul music
