= Amy Hart (singer) =

American singer-songwriter

- Born: Amy Ann Hart
- Origin: Chicago, U.S.
- Genres: Blues; Country; R&B; rock
- Occupation: Singer-songwriter
- Instrument: Voice
- Website: amyhart.com

Amy Ann Hart is a Chicago-born singer-songwriter who currently resides in Nashville. After performing as a blues musician at festivals, she formed her first original music band, Amy Hart and The Attack, before creating Amy Hart and the Essential Trio in the late 1980s.

Amy Hart's debut solo album, Every Beat of My Heart, was released in 2000 under the Painted Rock Records label after she moved to Nashville, and re-released in 2001 by Orchard. A country music album showing rock and blues influences, it was followed in 2011 by Congratulations, her second solo album which retained a country and rock flavor, but focused on the blues.

In 1980's, Amy Hart recorded the song "Too Cruel" for the Girls Just Want to Have Fun soundtrack. The song was written with Tim Tobias.

== Discography ==
- Congratulations (2011), Painted Rock Records
- Every Beat of My Heart (2000), Paint Chip
- "Too Cruel", Girls Just Want to Have Fun (Soundtrack) (1985), PolyGram Records/Mercury Records
- "Sad Love Song", Chicago Rocks Volume One (1980), WLUP-FM98
