= Cliff Sarde =

American musician

Cliff Sarde is an American composer, multi-instrumentalist and recording artist.
