= Conny & Jean =

German singing duo

Conny & Jean were a singing duo in Germany in the 1970s and 1980s. Their penultimate Single Hilf mir, ich lieb' dich / Wege durch die Nacht (1984) was produced by Dieter Bohlen.

== Discography ==
=== Singles ===
- Wenn die Aprikosenbäume blühn / Zarathustras Zeitmaschine (1976)
- Love, Love, Love / Kind Of Feeling (1979)
- Und dennoch bleibt die Welt nicht steh'n / Ich finde dich und mein Glück (Leaving on a jetplane) (1980)
- Frei wie ein Vogel / Für uns zwei (1980)
- Verrückter Sommer / Wie am ersten Tag (1981)
- Felicità / Wenn tausend Sonnen auf einmal strahlen (1982)
- Das Gefühl füreinander zu leben / Sonne, Erde, Mond und Sterne (1983)
- Mamma Maria / Manchmal bei Nacht (1983)
- Leben ohne dich / Irgendwie kam alles anders (1983)
- Hilf mir, ich lieb' dich / Wege durch die Nacht (1984)
- Zum Frühstück Liebe mit Kaffee / Du bist da (1985)

=== Albums ===
- Caastelbekk (1975)
- 2x7 - Songs der Welt (1976)
- Das Gefühl füreinander... (1984)
