= When the Lights Go Out (album) =

Studio album by Pia Zadora
- Released: August 13, 1988
- Recorded: 1987
- Studio: Flyte Time Studios (Edina, Minnesota)
- Genres: Dance, pop
- Label: CBS (European release only)
- Producer: Jimmy Jam and Terry Lewis

Pia Zadora chronology
I Am What I Am (1987)	When the Lights Go Out (1988)	Pia Z (1989)

When the Lights Go Out is the fifth studio album by American singer and actress Pia Zadora, released on August 13, 1988 by CBS Records. Although the album was originally only released in Europe, it was reissued in July 2014 as a 2-CD set, finally getting a U.S. release.

== Background ==
The set was produced by Jimmy Jam and Terry Lewis in 1987 and was intended to be released in the United States on Epic Records, but those plans were scrapped and was instead released in Europe through CBS Records, where it failed to chart in that region. Its only release from that album, "Dance Out of My Head," peaked at number 65 in the United Kingdom.

On July 28, 2014, US label Funky Town Grooves reissued the album in a 2-CD set, with the entire tracks remastered on one CD while the second CD contained 6 unreleased remixed versions of "Dance Out of My Head" and 5 unreleased remixes of "Heartbeat of Love" from the studio album Pia Z (1989). This marked the first time that the album was released in the United States since Epic's decision to shelve the release stateside.

== Track listing ==
All tracks composed by James Harris III and Terry Lewis

=== 1988 and 2014 reissue ===
1. "I Don't Wanna Love" – 4:26
2. "Still Remembered" – 4:37
3. "Dance Out of My Head" – 4:39
4. "Laughin' at You" – 3:54
5. "When the Lights Go Out" – 4:14
6. "Pia's Interlude" – 0:25
7. "I Really Like You (Not Him)" – 5:04
8. "Silence" – 3:40
9. "Since I've Been Lovin' You" – 4:40
10. "Pia's Theme" – 1:49
11. "It's Always the Same" – 5:23

=== 2014 reissue (CD2 remixes) ===
1. "Dance Out of My Head" (The Dressed Down Mix)
2. "Dance Out of My Head" (House Groove Mix)
3. "Dance Out of My Head" (Jam & Lewis Remix)
4. "Dance Out of My Head" (Ben Liebrand Mix)
5. "Dance Out of My Head" (Dub version)
6. "Dance Out of My Head" (7" version)
7. "Heartbeat of Love" (7" version)
8. "Heartbeat of Love" (C&C Club Mix)
9. "Heartbeat of Love" (C&C Dub Mix)
10. "Heartbeat of Love" (Freestyle Club Mix)
11. "Heartbeat of Love" (The DJ's Bonus Beats)

== Personnel ==
- Pia Zadora – lead vocals
- Jimmy Jam – drum and keyboard programming, digital and analog keyboards, acoustic piano, percussion
- Terry Lewis – drum programming, acoustic and electric basses, guitars, percussion
