= Flame (Real Life album) =

Studio album by Real Life
- Released: October 1985
- Recorded: AAV Studios, Melbourne; Battery Studios, London; Marquee Studios, London; Abbey Road Studios, London; Hansa Tonstudios, Berlin
- Genre: Electronic; new wave
- Label: Wheatley Records, Curb Records
- Producer: Peter Henderson

Real Life chronology
Master Mix (1984)	Flame (1985)	Down Comes the Hammer (1986)

Singles from Flame
- 1. "Face to Face" Released: September 1985; 2. "One Blind Love"/"Love's Not Easy" Released: December 1985

Flame is the second studio album from the Australian band Real Life. It was released in October 1985 on Glenn Wheatley's Wheatley Records in Australia. The album peaked at No. 42 on the Australian Kent Music Report.

== Critical reception ==
Professional ratings
Review scores
Source	Rating
AllMusic	4/5 stars

Tomas Mureika from AllMusic said "David Sterry and Richard Zatorski again have assembled a collection of solid synth pop singles-that-could-have-been," adding, "The hooky verses and singalong chorus were designed for radio play, but it was not meant to be."

== Track listing ==
All songs written by David Sterry and Richard Zatorski.

Side A
No.	Title	Length
1.	"No Shame"	3:28
2.	"Face to Face"	4:20
3.	"One Blind Love"	4:22
4.	"The Longest Day"	4:06
5.	"I Wish"	4:59

Side B
No.	Title	Length
1.	"Flame"	5:05
2.	"The Legend"	4:12
3.	"Take My Breath Away"	3:32
4.	"Let's Fall in Love"	3:45
5.	"Cathedral"	4:18

== Personnel ==
Adapted from the album liner notes.

Real Life

- David Sterry – vocals, guitar
- Richard Zatorski – keyboards, violin
- Allan Johnson – bass
- Danny Simcic – drums, drum programming

Additional musicians

- Steve Boltz – saxophone ("I Wish")
- Wilbur Wilde – guitar solo ("The Legend")
- Nicholai Ugrinsky – additional drum programming

Technical

- Peter Henderson – producer, engineer
- Paul Schroeder – assistant engineer
- Peter Thompson – assistant engineer
- Edu Meyer – assistant engineer
- Steve Hall – mastering
- Shoot That Tiger! – artwork
- Tomek and Eryk – photography

== Charts ==
Chart (1985)	Peak position
Australia (Kent Music Report)	42

== Release history ==
Country	Date	Format	Label	Catalogue
Australia	October 1985	Vinyl Record; Cassette	Wheatley Records	SFL1 0128
United States of America	1985	Compact Disc; Cassette	Curb Records, MCA Records,	MCA-5639
