= Rainey Haynes =

American musician

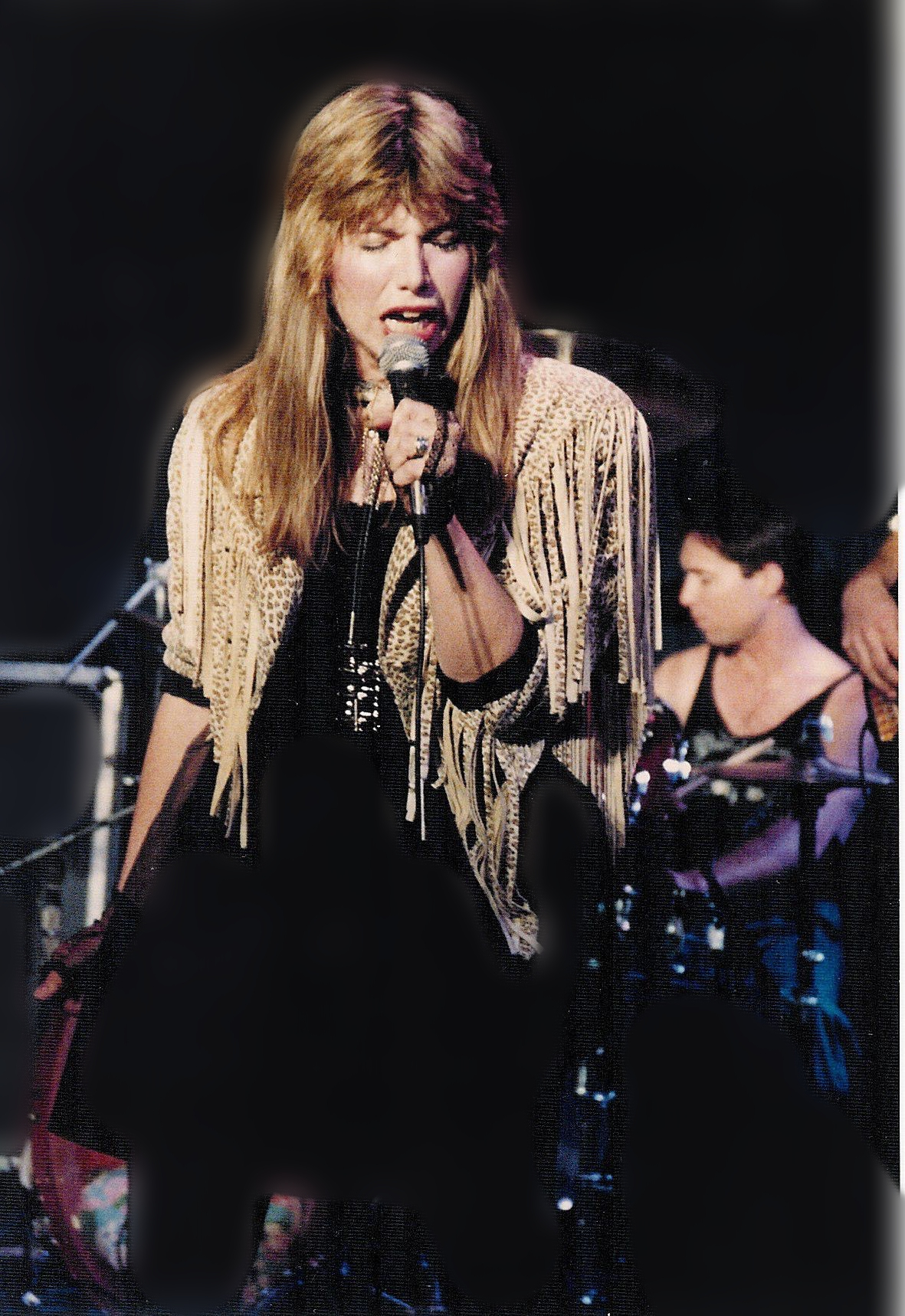
Rainey Haynes at My Place, Santa Monica, California, in 2010

Rainey Haynes (born August 16, 1964 in Memphis, Tennessee) also known simply as Rainey, is an American rock singer and writer.

== Early life ==
Haynes showed an interest in singing, songwriting, and performing early, and had taught herself to play guitar by age 13.

== Career ==
At 18, she moved to New Orleans, where she formed a rock band. By her early 20s, she was touring the South with her band; she toured Europe and the Near East to entertain U.S. troops. Returning to the U.S., she continued to travel, performing with her band. In Nashville she recorded an album for MCA Records produced by Ron Chancy, and she was nominated "Most Promising New Artist of the Year" by the Country Music Association.

In 1986, she moved to Los Angeles, where she played at Southern California music venues with a new version of her band. It variously included Steve Farris (lead guitarist for Mr. Mister), Bob Birch (long time bass player for Elton John), Rocket Ritchotte (former guitarist for David Lee Roth, Cher), Kenny Rarrick (former keyboard player for Melissa Manchester), and Michael Dorian (former keyboard player for Terence Trent D'Arby).

She studied acting and dance at the National Academy of Performing Arts in Hollywood, under the guidance of the Hollywood actor and writer, Francis Lederer. Lederer had Rainey sing for him at every class session. She worked in scenes with Martin Landau (North by Northwest, Ed Wood) and tried to break into films, once considered for a role opposite Michael J. Fox in the 1987 film, Light of Day (the role went to Joan Jett), as well as for the Ellen Aim character in Streets of Fire (the role went to Diane Lane). During this time she made appearances in Cop Rock. She studied video production with director Raymond Nassau (a former cinematographer for Cecil B. DeMille).

Her songs were included in film and TV soundtracks. Her voice was heard in numerous episodes of the TV series Fame, and she sang the theme song to the TV series Dancing to the Hits. From the mid-1980s into the 1990s, she free-lanced for Hanna-Barbera Studios for both their animated TV and movie divisions as the singing voice of "Brittany", Alvin the Chipmunk's girlfriend. This involved a difficult process of recording where Rainey sang to pre-recorded tracks playing back at half-speed, on which she would sing rock songs in the same, high keys, holding the same, difficult high notes, holding them twice as long as in a normal rock tune, after which the whole thing would then be played back at the original speed, with the result that the instruments sounded normal and her voice had the requisite, "chipmunk" sound. She has since said that it was the most difficult singing job she ever had. She was known at that time around Hanna-Barbera as "the funkiest chipmunk ever!" Other songs by Rainey in the movies included "Old Enough To Rock and Roll," which she wrote and performed for the film Iron Eagle and "I Can Fly" and “Technique, written and produced by Jay Levy and Jack Conrad,” two songs that she performed for the Sarah Jessica Parker film Girls Just Want To Have Fun. Without any support or promotion by the record company responsible for the soundtrack of "Girls Just Want To Have Fun" and solely as the result of New York area DJs playing the song because of requests, "I Can Fly" reached the Billboard Top Ten Dance Chart and stayed in the top ten for six months following the film's release. The European label Disconet released a 7:35 extended dance mix version of Rainey singing "I Can Fly" in their "Disconet Remix Greatest Hits" series.

In 1987, Rainey toured France for six months as backup vocalist and duet singer for French superstar Johnny Hallyday. The following year, she appeared on the T.V. show Star Search and won Best Female Vocalist three times.

In the early 1990s. she and her partner Rob, had moved to an island north of Seattle, where they bought a farm in rural Washington state. The farm had the remnants of a sign for which the upper plank was missing and the lower said, "and Holly Farm." They named the place And Holly Farm, and built a house and recording studio. By 1992 Rainey had completed work on a rock musical play called Hunchback (based on Victor Hugo's 1831 novel, The Hunchback of Notre-Dame). The play was produced in 1994 at the Playhouse Theater in Seattle, with Rainey as producer, director and lead actor. A larger production was staged for five weeks in 1998 at Seattle's King Cat Theater.

Throughout the 1990s and beyond, she performed in local Seattle night-spots, focusing largely on jazz. In the early 2000s (decade), she became involved in organizing benefit concerts for local Seattle charities. Today she continues to write music, which she records in her studio, and to produce works in the visual arts media of stone sculpting and oil painting. She also writes fiction and poetry.

== Sources ==
- Phillip Hardy's music review of Rainey at soundthesirens.com
- Biography and music review of Rainey at last.fm
- Biography and Rainey's rating in the top ten best sellers at weedshare.com
- Ann Medlock's poem "Clergy" in her book Arias Riffs and Whispers pays tribute to Rainey as she appeared in a concert in the opening stanza annmedlock.com
- Billboard Magazine, May 25, 1985, the column "Dance Trax" by Brian Chin
- Odimusic website
- Forthpalm Music
