= Openhearted =

Single by Real Life

from the album Heartland
- B-side: "Pick Me Up"
- Released: August 1983
- Recorded: Richmond Recorders
- Genre: Synth-pop
- Length: 3:52
- Label: Wheatley Records
- Songwriters: David Sterry; Richard Zatorski
- Producer: Ross Fraser

Real Life singles chronology
""Send Me an Angel" (1983)	"Openhearted" (1983)	"Catch Me I'm Falling" (1983)

"Openhearted" is a 1983 song by Australian band Real Life. The song was released in August 1983 as the second single from the band's debut studio album Heartland. The song peaked at number 72 on the Australian Kent Music Report. It was used in the 1984 film Voyage of the Rock Aliens.

== Reception ==
In an album review, Tomas Mureika from AllMusic said "Openhearted" was "built on solid [a] pop hook."

== Track listing ==
7" single (WRS 003)

1. "Openhearted" – 3:52
2. "Pick Me Up" – 3:18

== Charts ==
Chart (1983)	Peak position
Australia (Kent Music Report)	72
