= Pia Zadora =

American actress and singer (born 1954)

- Born: Pia Alfreda Schipani; May 4, 1954 (age 72); Hoboken, New Jersey, U.S.
- Occupations: Actress; singer
- Years active: 1964–present
- Spouses: Meshulam Riklis (m. 1977; div. 1993); Jonathan Kaufer (m. 1995; div. 2001); Michael Jeffries (m. 2005; div. 2024)
- Children: 3

Pia Zadora (born Pia Alfreda Schipani; May 4, 1954) is an American actress and singer. She debuted as a child actress on Broadway, in regional theater, and in the film Santa Claus Conquers the Martians (1964). She came to national attention in 1981 when, following her starring role in the highly criticized Butterfly, she won a Golden Globe Award as New Star of the Year while simultaneously winning the Golden Raspberry Award for Worst Actress and the Worst New Star for the same performance.

In the 1980s, her film career failed to achieve critical success, so she focused on music. As a singer, she has released several albums featuring popular standards, often backed by a symphonic orchestra. She was nominated for a Grammy in 1984.

== Early life ==
Zadora was born in Hoboken, New Jersey. Her father, Alphonse Schipani, was an Italian-American violinist, and her mother, Saturnina Schipani (née Zadorowski), was a Polish-American theatrical wardrobe supervisor for Broadway productions, the Metropolitan Opera and the New York City Opera.

She adapted part of her mother's maiden name as her stage name. She appeared as a child actress with Tallulah Bankhead in Midgie Purvis, and played the youngest sister (Bielke) in the Broadway production of Fiddler on the Roof (1964–66).

== Career ==
=== Film ===
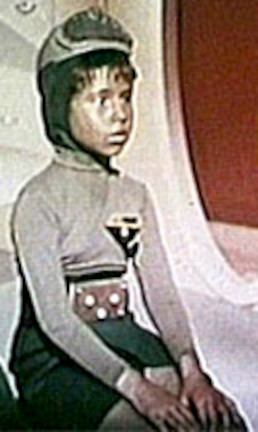
Zadora in Santa Claus Conquers the Martians

Zadora got her first film role at the age of nine portraying Girmar, a young Martian girl, in 1964's Santa Claus Conquers the Martians, widely regarded as one of the worst films ever made.

Zadora's acting career made little progress until, while touring with a musical production in 1972, she met Meshulam Riklis, 30 years her senior. They married on September 18, 1977. Not long after her marriage, Zadora had a breakthrough as the Dubonnet Girl, appearing in print and television commercials for the apéritif wine, in whose American distributor Riklis was a shareholder.

She starred with Stacy Keach and Orson Welles in the 1982 film adaptation of James M. Cain's novel Butterfly, whose plot involved father-daughter incest. The score features Zadora singing "It's Wrong for Me to Love You". She won that year's Golden Globe Award as Best New Star of the Year amid charges that Riklis had purchased the award with a promotional campaign that included Zadora's image on Sunset Boulevard billboards, an appearance in Playboy magazine, and entertaining Golden Globe voters. Most critics responded negatively to her performance (for example, The New York Times film critic Vincent Canby described Zadora's performance in the film as "spectacularly inept"), and she received the 1982 Razzies awards for both Worst New Star and Worst Actress.

Zadora next starred in the 1982 film Fake-Out, also called Nevada Heat, a women in prison B-movie comedy co-starring Telly Savalas and Desi Arnaz Jr. In 1983, she appeared in the film adaptation of the Harold Robbins novel The Lonely Lady, as an aspiring screenwriter who achieves success after surviving sexual assault. For this performance she received the 1983 Golden Raspberry Award for Worst Actress. On the basis of multiple nominations by the Golden Raspberry Awards, Zadora was named Worst New Star of the Decade (1980–89) and nominated as Worst Actress of the 1980s.

In 1985, Zadora starred as the object of an extraterrestrial's affections in the musical comedy Voyage of the Rock Aliens. In addition to displaying her comedic side, it showcased her musical talents and featured half of the songs from her 1984 album Let's Dance Tonight. In 1988 she appeared as a beatnik in John Waters's film Hairspray, about which the film critic Roger Ebert wrote: "If nothing else is worth the price of admission to this movie, perhaps you will be persuaded by the prospect of Zadora reading from Allen Ginsberg's Howl."

In 2000, Zadora was nominated at the 20th Golden Raspberry Awards as Worst Actress of the Century, ultimately losing to Madonna.

=== Music ===
Between 1978 and 1980 Zadora scored modest hits on the US Country charts with the non-album singles "Bedtime Stories", "Tell Him", "I Know a Good Thing When I Feel It" and "Baby It's You".

In 1980, she released the non-album single "Don't Knock My Love," a duet with Lou Christie, but it failed to chart.

In 1981, Zadora contributed the song "It's Wrong For Me to Love You" to the soundtrack for the film Butterfly, in which she also co-starred (with Stacy Keach).

In 1982, she contributed the songs "Those Eyes", "Come Clean" and "Turnaround" to the soundtrack for the film Fake-Out, in which she also co-starred (with Telly Savalas). Also in 1982 Zadora released her debut album Pia, a collection of mostly traditional pop and easy listening selections. Included were her soundtrack contributions "It's Wrong For me to Love You" and "Those Eyes", as well as her previously released Country single "Baby It's You". The single "I'm in Love Again" reached No. 45 on the Billboard Hot 100 in 1982.

In 1983, Zadora's cover of the Shirley Ellis hit "The Clapping Song", recorded for the soundtrack to the film The Lonely Lady reached No. 36 on the Billboard Hot 100). This would be her only Top 40 hit in the U.S.

In 1984 she recorded the synth-heavy dance single "When the Rain Begins to Fall", a duet with Jermaine Jackson, for the soundtrack to the film Voyage of the Rock Aliens. While only moderately successful in the U.S., it was a bigger hit in international markets, reaching No. 1 in Germany and the Netherlands. Later that year, Zadora released her second album Let's Dance Tonight (retitled When the Rain Begins to Fall in Europe). In addition to this duet, the album also included "The Clapping Song" from the previous year. The singles "A Little Bit of Heaven" and "Let's Dance Tonight" reached the top 20 in some European territories. "Rock It Out" reached No. 110 on the Billboard Hot 100 and earned her a nomination for a Grammy Award for Best Female Rock Vocal Performance, though she lost to Tina Turner's "One of the Living", from the film Mad Max: Beyond Thunderdome.

In 1985, Zadora released Pia & Phil, an album of standards with the London Philharmonic Orchestra, and recorded a follow-up album again with the Philharmonic in 1986 titled I Am What I Am. This style of music proved to be a boon for Zadora as she finally began to gain notice for her vocal abilities.

In 1988, Zadora went in a more pop direction, working with producers Jimmy Jam and Terry Lewis on an album titled When the Lights Go Out. The album's only single, "Dance Out of My Head" failed to chart in the U.S., despite club remixes by top producers Shep Pettibone and Ben Liebrand. Due in part to the single's lack of traction, as well as Zadora's streak of unsuccessful music releases in the U.S. up until that point, Epic Records decided to shelve the album stateside and released it (under its CBS Records label) only in Europe where Zadora had previously found some success.

In 1989, Zadora recorded the album Pia Z with producer Narada Michael Walden. The lead single "Heartbeat of Love", which included club remixes by Robert Civillés and David Cole of C+C Music Factory, reached #17 on the US Dance and remained on the charts for 8 weeks. Despite this, the album itself failed to chart. A second single, "If You Were Mine", was released only for radio and promotional use rather than a full commercial release and did gain moderate airplay on some adult contemporary stations. The album also included the song "Floating Hearts", originally recorded by Sheena Easton for her No Sound But a Heart album. Also produced by Walden, it was used on Zadora's U.S. release after Easton's album was released mainly in Europe.

Pia—The Platinum Collection, a three-CD compilation, was released in 1993 and sold in the United States via infomercials. The album included repackaged versions of Pia & Phil, I Am What I Am, and Pia Today!.

In 1994, Zadora had a cameo appearance in the comedy Naked Gun 33 1/3: The Final Insult. In her segment of the film, Zadora performed the Steve Allen–penned "This Could Be the Start of Something Big" during a parody of an Academy Awards musical number.

=== Cabaret ===
In 2011, Zadora began a small attempt at a comeback with a cabaret show titled Pia Zadora: Back Again, and Standing Tall. In February, she performed at the Eissey Campus Theatre in Palm Beach Gardens, Florida and the Kaye Auditorium in Boca Raton. She took the show to The Rrazz Room in San Francisco on June 8 where it ran for five performances until June 12. Zadora appeared at San Francisco's Rrazz Room's 3rd annual Rrazziversary Gala Celebration and Benefit for St. Jude Children's Research Hospital on March 17, 2011, and at the Nevada Children's Center's Great Gatsby Gala on April 3, 2011.

In 2012, Zadora performed with the Desert Symphony Orchestra at the McCallum Theatre in Palm Desert, California, and appeared on the TV show Celebrity Ghost Stories.

in 2013 Zadora began to host and perform Pia's Place at Las Vegas restaurant Piero's Italian Cuisine since. She no longer perform's the show as of 2026, per Piero's website.

== Personal life ==
Zadora married businessman Meshulam Riklis in 1977, when she was 23 and he was 54. She was a marquee headliner at the Riviera Hotel in Las Vegas during the early 1970s owing to her association with Riklis and Sinatra. Zadora and Riklis bought the Beverly Hills mansion Pickfair Manor in January 1988 from Los Angeles Lakers owner Jerry Buss for almost US$7 million (equivalent to almost $19.1 million in 2025). They demolished most of the structure while keeping the guest houses, claiming that termites and time had made repairs difficult.

The house, once the shared home of Douglas Fairbanks and Mary Pickford, was demolished and a new 25,000-square-foot (2,300 m^{2}) house was built on the property. Zadora later claimed on a September 2012 episode of BIO's Celebrity Ghost Stories that Pickfair was razed owing to a troubling apparition that appeared to her and children when her husband was away on business. Riklis commissioned a nude oil portrait of Zadora, which greeted visitors.

With first husband Riklis, she had two children.

Zadora and Riklis divorced in 1993, and Zadora remained in the mansion until late 2005 or early 2006, when she sold it to Korean businessman Corry Hong for US$17.65 million (equivalent to $28.19 million in 2025).

Zadora's second husband was writer-director Jonathan Kaufer. They were married from August 1995 to November 2001, and had one child. In 2010 Kaufer brought a defamation lawsuit against Zadora, alleging that she falsely accused Kaufer of sexually molesting their son. It was dismissed because the presiding judge found Zadora's comments to be protected speech. Kaufer was killed in a road accident on October 2, 2013. He had been on his way from Las Vegas to Los Angeles.

Zadora married Michael Jeffries, a detective with the Las Vegas Metropolitan Police Department, in 2005. They met when Zadora contacted the Las Vegas Police to report a stalking incident. They divorced in 2024. She lives in Summerlin, Nevada.

In June 2013, following an altercation with her teenage son, Zadora was charged with domestic violence, battery and coercion, and jailed after a SWAT team surrounded her home. Zadora, who admitted to drinking alcohol before the incident, was ordered by the presiding judge to "stay out of trouble for a year, attend impulse control counseling and follow recommendations of [an] alcohol evaluation."

In September 2014, Zadora was hospitalized in the intensive care unit of University Medical Center of Southern Nevada due to head and leg injuries sustained in a golf cart accident. By December, she was back to work.

== Filmography ==
=== Film ===
Year	Title	Role	Notes
1964	Santa Claus Conquers the Martians	Girmar	Debut film
1982	Butterfly	Kady Tyler	Golden Globe Award for New Star of the Year – Actress; Golden Raspberry Award for Worst Actress; Golden Raspberry Award for Worst New Star
1982	Fake-Out	Bobbie Warren	also known as Nevada Heat
1983	The Lonely Lady	Jerilee Randall	Golden Raspberry Award for Worst Actress
1984	Voyage of the Rock Aliens	Dee Dee	
1985	Feel the Motion	Herself	West German Movie
1988	Hairspray	Beatnik Chick	
1989	Troop Beverly Hills	Herself	
1994	Naked Gun 33 1/3: The Final Insult	Herself	

=== Television ===
Year	Title	Role	Notes
1983	Pajama Tops	Babette Latouche	TV movie
1990	Mother Goose Rock 'n' Rhyme	Little Miss Muffet	TV movie
1995	Favorite Deadly Sins	Herself	TV movie
1999	Frasier	Jill	Episode: "Dr. Nora" (voice only)

=== Theater ===
- The Garden of Sweets (1961)
- Midgie Purvis (1961)
- A Gift of Time (1962)
- We Take the Town (1962)
- Fiddler on the Roof (1965)
- Henry, Sweet Henry (1967)
- Dames at Sea (1968)
- Little Mary Sunshine (1970)
- Applause (1972)
- Promises, Promises (1973)
- Damn Yankees (1976)
- Funny Girl (1991)
- Crazy for You (1995)
- Pippin (1995)

== Discography ==
=== Albums ===
- 1982: Pia
- 1984: Let's Dance Tonight
- 1985: Pia & Phil (with London Philharmonic Orchestra)
- 1986: I Am What I Am
- 1988: When the Lights Go Out
- 1989: Pia Z
- 1989: Pia Today! (promo only until it was issued as part of The Platinum Collection)
- 1993: Only for Romantics (promo only)
- 1993: The Platinum Collection (included Pia & Phil, I Am What I Am, and Pia Today!)
- 2020: All or Nothing at All

=== Singles ===
Year	Single	Peak chart positions							
Year	Single	US	US Dan	US Country	AUS	UK	Germany	Netherlands	Album
1978	"Come Share My Love"	—	—	—	—	—	—	—	—
1979	"Bedtime Stories"	—	—	76	—	—	—	—	—
1979	"Tell Him"^{A}	—	—	98	—	—	—	—	—
1979	"I Know a Good Thing When I Feel It"	—	—	65	—	—	—	—	—
1980	"Baby It's You"	—	—	55	—	—	—	—	Pia
1980	"Don't Knock My Love" (with Lou Christie)	—	—	—	—	—	—	—	—
1982	"I'm in Love Again"	45	—	—	—	—	—	—	Pia
1983	"The Clapping Song"	36	—	—	—	—	—	—	The Lonely Lady
1983	"Iko Iko"^{B}	—	—	—	—	—	—	—	—
1984	"When the Rain Begins to Fall" (with Jermaine Jackson)	54	22	—	63	68	1	1	Let's Dance Tonight
1984	"Follow My Heartbeat"^{C}	—	—	—	—	—	—	—	Let's Dance Tonight
1984	"Let's Dance Tonight"	—	—	—	—	—	11	24	Let's Dance Tonight
1984	"Little Bit of Heaven"	—	—	—	—	—	10	—	Let's Dance Tonight
1984	"Rock It Out"	110	—	—	—	—	—	—	Let's Dance Tonight
1985	"Come Rain, Come Shine"	—	—	—	—	—	—	—	Pia & Phil
1986	"I Am What I Am"	—	—	—	—	—	—	—	I Am What I Am
1988	"Dance Out of My Head"	—	—	—	—	65	—	50	When the Lights Go Out
1989	"Heartbeat of Love"	—	17	—	—	—	—	—	Pia Z
1989	"If You Were Mine"	—	—	—	—	—	—	—	Pia Z

- ^{A}B-side to "Bedtime Stories"
- ^{B} Released only in France
- ^{C}B-side to "When the Rain Begins to Fall"

== Awards and nominations ==
Year	Award	Category	Work	Result
1981	Golden Globe Awards	New Star of the Year – Actress	Butterfly	Won
1983	Golden Raspberry Awards	Worst New Star	Butterfly	Won
1984	Golden Raspberry Awards	Worst Actress	Butterfly	Won
1984	Golden Raspberry Awards	Worst Actress	The Lonely Lady	Won
1990	Golden Raspberry Awards	Worst New Star of the Decade	Butterfly, The Lonely Lady	Won
1990	Golden Raspberry Awards	Worst Actress of the Decade	Butterfly, The Lonely Lady	Nominated
2000	Golden Raspberry Awards	Worst Actress of the Century	Voyage of the Rock Aliens, Butterfly, The Lonely Lady	Nominated
1982	Golden Apple Award	—N/a	Sour Apple	Won
1982	ShoWest Award	Young Star of the Year	—N/a	Won
1985	Grammy Awards	Best Rock Vocal Performance Female	Rock It Out	Nominated

== In popular culture ==
The cult TV series Mystery Science Theater 3000 riffed her debut film Santa Claus Conquers the Martians as a third season episode.
