= Timothy J. Tobias =

American composer and musician

Timothy John Tobias
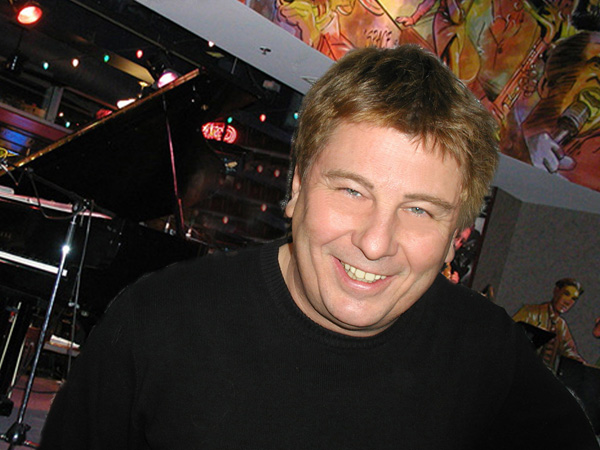

Background information
- Born: July 1, 1952; Chicago, Illinois, U.S.
- Died: December 23, 2006 (aged 54) Chicago, Illinois, U.S.

Timothy John Tobias (1 July 1952 – 23 December 2006) was an American composer and musician. He died aged 54 of lymphoma.

Tobias worked on the soundtracks to the films Fame, Girls Just Want to Have Fun, The Flintstones, The Sandlot, Medium Rare, and on Steven Spielberg's "Movie Maker". He also performed in shows by Bob Hope, Sammy Davis Jr., Rita Moreno, and Barry Manilow, and did studio work with Sister Sledge, Curtis Mayfield, Al Stewart, and Ramsey Lewis.

Tobias was born in Chicago, Illinois, and became an all-rounder who was equally at home composing feature films, playing live, or producing.

Jazz Artist: He released three albums of his own music, including Mister Cat, Speaking in Tones which is received praise among the jazz community across the country, and his latest release Transcention. He played at The Chicago Jazz Festival, Green Dolphin Street, Pops for Champagne, Joe's BeBop Cafe, The Backroom, and just about every other jazz venue in Chicago.

Composer: Tim worked on the soundtrack to Fame and wrote additional music for the feature films, Girls Just Want to Have Fun, The Flintstones, The Sandlot, Medium Rare, and A Piece of Eden. His compositions were also included on Steven Spielberg's Movie Maker from Knowledge Adventure and on many commercials. He was the composer for the television show - WTTW's show, Wild Chicago: Illinois Roadtrip, starring Ben Hollis.

Producer/Arranger: He was musical director to multiple artists and his background as a studio musician included work for such great recording artists as Sister Sledge, Curtis Mayfield, Al Stewart, and Ramsey Lewis. He also produced albums for David Crawford, The Roach Brothers, Ben Hollis, and Angelo Badalamenti. Tim Tobias owned and operated Beachaus Music, Inc. from 2001 to 2006.

Keyboard Player: Live performances included playing shows with the likes of Bob Hope, Sammy Davis Jr., and Rita Moreno—which earned him a solid reputation as an in-demand keyboardist. He played synthesizer for the world premiere of Could It Be Magic, directed by Barry Manilow, and several other original musicals at the Royal George Theatre, and most recently at the Goodman Theatre for Purlie.

== Discography ==
Mister Cat
Tracks:

1. "Every Day Is... April Fool's Day"
2. "Amazon"
3. "Laurie Louise"
4. "Margaretta"
5. "Garden of Dreams"
6. "Afternoon in Pasadena"
7. "Mister Cat"
8. "Full Moon Pocket"
9. "Morris Beach"
10. "Twilight Time"
11. "Sunny Monday"

Speaking in Tones
Speaking in Tones is a collection of jazz instrumentals performed by Tim Tobias. Tracks one through seven are live recordings from one of Chicago's jazz venues, Pops for Champagne. The last two bonus tracks were recorded in a studio. Tim wrote 8 of the 9 songs included on this album.

Tracks:

1. "The Balled Eagle"
2. "Latin Fantasy #2"
3. "Orange Was The Color of Her Dress... Then Silk Blue" (by Charles Mingus)
4. "The Other Irene"
5. "Donna Louise"
6. "Mary Jane"
7. "Speaking in Tones"
8. "Fanfare for the Lost Soul"
9. "September"

Transcention
Transcention released in 2006, contains 10 classic jazz compositions performed by his Chicago jazz trio.

Tracks:

1. "The Golden Waffle"
2. "Things I Meant to Say"
3. "Transcention"
4. "Lorraine"
5. "Via Escuela"
6. "I Give You This Much"
7. "Haus Party"
8. "George Street"
9. "Stablemates" (by Benny Golson)
10. "Arabesque One"
11. "Good Things Come... To Those Who Wait"
