= Heartland (Real Life album) =

Studio album by Real Life
- Released: November 1983
- Recorded: 1983
- Studios: Rhinoceros Studios, Sydney; AAV, Melbourne (Track A1); Richmond Recorders, Melbourne (Track B3)
- Genres: Synthpop; new wave
- Length: 39:56
- Labels: Wheatley (AUS); MCA (US, UK, CAN); Curb (EUR, CAN, JAP)
- Producers: Steve Hillage; Ross Cockle (Track A1); Ross Fraser (Track B3)

Real Life chronology
| Heartland (1983) | Master Mix (1984) |

Singles from Heartland
- 1. "Send Me an Angel" Released: May 1983; 2. "Openhearted" Released: August 1983; 3. "Catch Me I'm Falling" Released: November 1983; 4. "Always (European release only)" Released: August 1984

Heartland is the debut studio album from Australian band Real Life. The album was released in Australia in November 1983. The album peaked at number 30 on the Australian Kent Music Report and remained in the charts for 27 weeks.

At the Countdown Music and Video Awards of 1983, the album won Best Debut Album.

== Reception ==
Professional ratings
Review scores
| Source | Rating |
|---|---|
| AllMusic | 4.5/5 stars |

Tomas Mureika from AllMusic called Heartland "One of the strongest -- and most unappreciated -- albums of the new wave era" and singled out "Catch Me I'm Falling" as the best track on the album. Mureika said "The title track is a stirring, brooding anthem, worthy of U2's powerful early new wave days, complete with wailing guitar solo. "Broken Again," "Breaking Point," and "Openhearted" are built on solid pop hooks, while the album's closer "Burning Blue" is a melancholic summation of a great record."

== Track listing ==
All songs written by David Sterry and Richard Zatorski.

Side A
| No. | Title | Length |
|---|---|---|
| 1. | "Send Me an Angel" | 3:53 |
| 2. | "Catch Me I'm Falling" | 3:33 |
| 3. | "Under the Hammer" | 3:24 |
| 4. | "Heartland" | 4:56 |
| 5. | "Breaking Point" | 4:18 |

Side B
| No. | Title | Length |
|---|---|---|
| 1. | "Broken Again" | 3:58 |
| 2. | "Always" | 3:11 |
| 3. | "Openhearted" | 3:50 |
| 4. | "Exploding Bullets" | 4:10 |
| 5. | "Burning Blue" | 4:43 |

== Personnel ==
Real Life

- David Sterry – vocals, guitar
- Richard Zatorski – keyboards
- Allan Johnson – bass
- Danny Simcic – drums

Additional musicians

- Lisa Edwards – backing vocals ("Send Me an Angel")

Technical

- Steve Hillage – producer (except "Send Me an Angel" and "Openhearted"), remix ("Send Me an Angel" and "Openhearted")
- Ross Cockle – producer ("Send Me an Angel")
- Ross Fraser – producer ("Openhearted")
- Andrew Scott – engineer (except "Send Me an Angel" and "Openhearted")
- Steve Hall – mastering
- Geoff Ambler – cover photography

== Charts ==
| Chart (1983–1984) | Peak position |
|---|---|
| Australia (Kent Music Report) | 30 |
| Canada Top Albums/CDs (RPM) | 45 |
| German Albums (Offizielle Top 100) | 12 |
| New Zealand Albums (RMNZ) | 38 |
| Swiss Albums (Schweizer Hitparade) | 10 |
| US Billboard 200 | 58 |
