= Real Life (band) =

Australian new wave and synth-pop band

- Origin: Melbourne, Victoria, Australia
- Genres: New wave; synth-pop
- Years active: 1980–present
- Labels: Wheatley; Curb; A Different Drum
- Members: David Sterry
- Past members: Richard Zatorski; Steve Williams; Rob Burke; Scott Ingram; Allan Johnson; George Pappas; Danny Simcic; Dean Walliss
- Website: www.facebook.com/reallifetheband/

Real Life are an Australian new wave and synth-pop band that achieved international chart success with their 1983 singles "Send Me an Angel" and "Catch Me I'm Falling", both of which were taken from their debut studio album, Heartland (1983). The band originally consisted of David Sterry (lead vocals and guitar), Richard Zatorski (keyboards and violin), Allan Johnson (bass guitar), and Danny Simcic (drums). Steve Williams (keyboards) replaced Zatorski in 1986, and was replaced by George Pappas in 1995 after a long hiatus of band activity.

== History ==
=== 1980–1984: Heartland ===
In late 1980, Richard Zatorski placed an ad in a Melbourne newspaper as a keyboard player looking for a guitarist with whom to write songs, and David Sterry responded. The two formed a writing partnership and began work on the material that would eventually become the first songs by Real Life. First using the name The Wires, Sterry and Zatorski started doing gigs accompanied by a primitive drum machine they named Gloria. In 1981, the pair decided to recruit more musicians, and through another newspaper ad, they found bassist Allan Johnson and drummer Danny Simcic. The group changed their name to avoid confusion with the English band Wire, and became known as A Private Life, which soon gained a loyal following, opening for bands such as INXS, Mi-Sex, The Church, Midnight Oil, and others. A band from Sydney called Private Lives threatened legal action over their name, which prompted them to change it once again, this time to Real Life.

After hearing an early version of "Send Me an Angel", the group's manager, Glenn Wheatley, was so impressed that he formed his own label, Wheatley Records, to release it as a single in early 1983. "Send Me an Angel" became a top 10 hit in Australia, and led to Real Life being signed to the Curb Records label (which was distributed by MCA Records at that time) for the world outside of Australia. The song went on to top the charts in New Zealand and Germany, and entered the top 30 in the US. The second single, "Openhearted", was released in August 1983 and peaked at #72. In November 1983, "Catch Me I'm Falling" was released, eventually reaching the top 10 in Australia and Germany, as well as the top 40 in the US. The band's debut album, Heartland (produced by Steve Hillage), entered the top 40 in Australia, Germany, New Zealand, and Switzerland, and peaked at #58 in the US. "Always" was released in Europe in August 1984 as the album's fourth and final single, followed by the November 1984 release of Master Mix, an EP of remixes that peaked at #74 on the Australian charts.

=== 1985–1986: Flame and Down Comes the Hammer ===
In September 1985, they released "Face to Face" as the lead single from their second studio album, Flame, which came out the following month. "Face to Face" was a minor hit, peaking at #32 in Australia, while the album peaked at #42. The follow-up single "One Blind Love" fared less well, while the album and its singles went largely overlooked in the rest of the world.

In 1986, they recorded a handful of new songs, which were the band's first recordings not written by Sterry and Zatorski. "Babies", written by the songwriting team of Holly Knight, Michael Des Barres, and Mike Chapman, was released as a single, but failed to chart; another track, "Hammer of Love", was written by Steve Williams, who had replaced Zatorski earlier in the year. Both tracks were included on a compilation titled Down Comes the Hammer (which also included another new song, a remix of the title track of Flame, and a handful of other tracks from the band's two albums), which was only released in North America and France. Also in 1986, the movie Rad featured "Send Me an Angel" on its soundtrack, and featured it in a scene wherein riders on BMX bikes performed various freestyle stunts as the song played.

=== 1989–2000: Lifetime and Happy ===
In 1989, Real Life released a new version of "Send Me an Angel", titled "Send Me an Angel '89", which fared slightly better than the original in the United States. The video for the 1989 version was identical to the original, except that Zatorski was edited out of all shots; another version for the Australian market was filmed in Ormond College, University of Melbourne, with Williams on keyboards.

The group released their third studio album, Lifetime, in 1990. This was their first album of all-new material in five years. The album spawned minor hits with "God Tonight" and "Kiss the Ground", both of which placed on Billboard's Modern Rock Tracks and Dance Club Songs charts in the United States. After a falling-out occurred between Sterry and the remaining two original members, Johnson and Simcic, the band went on hiatus for several years.

In 1997, Real Life reemerged as a duo with Sterry and new member George Pappas on keyboards. Following the release of their fourth studio album, Happy, the band embarked on an extensive tour of the US, Germany and Australia, and were invited to perform at Salt Lake City's Synthstock2000 with Orchestral Manoeuvres in the Dark and Berlin.

=== 2003–present day: Imperfection ===
In 2003, the band signed to the American independent label A Different Drum, and released their fifth studio album, Imperfection. They toured the west coast of the US in 2004 as a trio of Sterry and Pappas with drummer Scott Ingram. In November 2005, Pappas announced his departure from the band, leaving Sterry to continue as Real Life on his own, performing at various 1980s-themed events such as Australia's Absolutely 80s and the US' Lost 80's Live. Pappas began recording solo material under the name Alien Skin in 2007, and A Different Drum released his debut album, Don't Open Till Doomsday, the following year.

On 19 May 2009, Real Life released their sixth studio album, Send Me An Angel – '80s Synth Essentials, on Cleopatra Records in the US. In addition to another new recording (and two remixes) of "Send Me an Angel", the album includes cover versions of twelve other 1980s new wave classics by acts such as Depeche Mode, The Cure, Eurythmics, Tears for Fears, and Gary Numan.

After another lengthy hiatus, Sterry resurrected Real Life again in 2020 with a new studio album, Sirens.

== Discography ==
=== Studio albums ===
Title	Album details	Peak chart position				
Title	Album details	AUS	GER	NZ	SWI	USA
Heartland	Released: November 1983; Label: Wheatley (WRLP 1003); Formats: Vinyl, CD, cassette	30	12	38	10	58
Flame	Released: October 1985; Label: Wheatley (SFL1 0128); Formats: Vinyl, CD, cassette	42	–	–	–	–
Lifetime	Released: October 1990; Label: Curb, (D2-77271); Formats: Vinyl, CD, cassette	95	–	–	–	–
Happy	Released: October 1997; Label: Momentum (MOM1001); Formats: CD	–	–	–	–	–
Imperfection	Released: 2004; Label: A Different Drum (ADDCD1193); Formats: 2×CD	–	–	–	–	–
Send Me an Angel – '80s Synth Essentials	Released: 2009; Label: Cleopatra (CLP3524); Formats: CD, digital download	–	–	–	–	–
Sirens	Released: January 2020; Label: Real Life Music; Formats: CD, LP, digital download	–	–	–	–	–

=== Compilations ===
Title	Album details	Peak chart position
Title	Album details	AUS
Master Mix	Released: November 1984; Label: Wheatley (VAL1 0470); Formats: Vinyl	74
Down Comes the Hammer	Released: 1986 (US only); Label: Curb/MCA (MCA-5834); Formats: Vinyl record, Cassette	—N/a
Send Me An Angel '89	Released: 1989 (international only); Label: Curb (CRBD-10614); Formats: Vinyl, CD, cassette	—N/a
Let's Fall in Love	Released: 1989 (US only); Label: Curb (CRB-10624); Formats: Vinyl, CD, cassette	—N/a
So Far	Released: 1990; Label: Curb (SPCD 1187); Formats: Vinyl, CD, cassette	–

=== Singles ===
Year	Song	AUS	AUT	CAN	GER	NZ	SPA	SWI	US	US Dance	US Alternative	Album
1983	"Send Me an Angel"	6	9	18	1	1	19	2	29	54	–	Heartland
1983	"Openhearted"	72	–	–	–	–	–	–	–	–	–	Heartland
1983	"Catch Me I'm Falling"	8	–	–	9	–	–	12	40	–	–	Heartland
1984	"Always" (Germany only)	—N/a	—N/a	—N/a	54	—N/a	—N/a	—N/a	—N/a	—N/a	—N/a	Heartland
1985	"Face to Face"	32	–	–	52	–	–	–	–	–	–	Flame
1985	"One Blind Love"/"Love's Not Easy"	–	–	–	–	–	–	–	–	–	–	Flame
1986	"Babies"	—N/a	–	–	–	—N/a	–	–	–	–	–	Down Comes the Hammer
1989	"Send Me an Angel '89"	51	–	–	–	22	–	–	26	5	–	Best of Real Life
1989	"Let's Fall in Love" (US and Canada only)	—N/a	—N/a	–	—N/a	—N/a	—N/a	—N/a	–	21	–	Let's Fall In Love
1990	"God Tonight"	83	–	–	–	–	–	–	–	9	15	Lifetime
1990	"Kiss the Ground"	161	–	–	–	–	–	–	–	27	–	Lifetime
1996	"Deep Sleep"	–	–	–	–	–	–	–	–	–	–	Happy
1997	"Meltdown"	–	–	–	–	–	–	–	–	–	–	Happy
1997	"Like a Ghost"	–	–	–	–	–	–	–	–	–	–	non-album single
2004	"Oblivion"	–	–	–	–	–	–	–	–	–	–	Imperfection
2005	"Send Me an Angel" (Starcity with Real Life)	–	–	–	–	–	–	–	–	–	–	non-album single
2015	"Way to Nowhere"/"Small World"	–	–	–	–	–	–	–	–	–	–	non-album single

== Awards and nominations ==
=== Countdown Music Awards ===
Countdown was an Australian pop music TV series on national broadcaster ABC-TV from 1974 to 1987 and it presented music awards from 1979 to 1987, known as the Countdown Music Awards.

Year	Nominee / work	Award	Result
1983	Heartland	Best Debut Album	Won
1983	"Send Me an Angel"	Best Debut Single	Nominated
1983	themselves	Most Promising New Talent	Won
