= Send Me an Angel (Real Life song) =

1983 single by Real Life

- 1983 Spain release

Single by Real Life

from the album Heartland
- B-side: "Like a Gun" (original release) "Always" (1989 reissue)
- Released: May 1983 (AUS); November 1983 (USA); 1989 (re-release)
- Genre: Synth-pop; new wave
- Length: 3:53
- Label: Wheatley; Curb; MCA; Intercord; Ariola
- Songwriters: David Sterry; Richard Zatorski
- Producer: Ross Cockle

Real Life singles chronology
"Send Me an Angel" (1983)	"Openhearted" (1983)

"Send Me an Angel" is a 1983 song by Australian band Real Life. The song was released in May 1983 as the band's debut single from their debut studio album Heartland. The song peaked in the top 10 in Australia and is the band's best-known song. This version peaked in early 1984 in the US at No. 29 on the Billboard Hot 100 chart. The song was No. 1 in Germany and New Zealand and Top 10 in other countries.

In the US, "Send Me an Angel '89" surpassed the original version from 1983. "Send Me An Angel '89" reached a peak of No. 26 on the Billboard Hot 100 chart in the summer of 1989 in the US. The re-release appeared in the 1989 film The Wizard.

== Track listing ==
7" single (WRS-001)

1. Send Me an Angel – 3:53
2. Like a Gun – 3:16

12" single

1. Send Me an Angel (Extended Dance Mix) – 5:40
2. Send Me an Angel – 3:53
3. Like a Gun – 3:14

12" Maxi-Single

1. Send Me an Angel (Extended Mix) – 5:43
2. Send Me an Angel – 3:53
3. Burning Blue – 4:43

== Charts ==
=== Original version ===
==== Weekly charts ====
Chart (1983–1984)	Peak position
Australia (Kent Music Report)	6
Austria (Ö3 Austria Top 40)	9
Canada Top Singles (RPM)	18
New Zealand (Recorded Music NZ)	1
Spain (AFYVE)	19
Switzerland (Schweizer Hitparade)	2
US Billboard Hot 100	29
US Cash Box Top 100	22
US Dance Club Songs (Billboard)	54
West Germany (GfK)	1

==== Year-end charts ====
Chart (1983)	Position
Australia (Kent Music Report)	26
New Zealand (Recorded Music NZ)	8

Chart (1984)	Position
Switzerland (Schweizer Hitparade)	27
West Germany (Official German Charts)	7

=== "Send Me an Angel '89" ===
Chart (1989)	Peak position
Australia (ARIA)	51
New Zealand (RIANZ)	22
US Billboard Hot 100	26
US Cash Box	20
US Dance Club Songs (Billboard)	5

== Cover versions ==
"Send Me an Angel" has been covered by various artists, including:

- Netzwerk on their 1992 EP Send Me an Angel
- Pobi on the 1993 album Send Me An Angel. Some of the lyrics were altered to be from the perspective of the other party in the song
- Atrocity on their 1997 cover album Werk 80
- Zeromancer on their 2001 album Eurotrash
- Thrice for the 2002 compilation Punk Goes Pop, which later appears on the 2005 compilation If We Could Only See Us Now
- Deadstar Assembly on their 2003 self-titled debut album
- XO Stereo on their 2015 EP The Struggle
- Highly Suspect on their 2016 album The Boy Who Died Wolf
- Gunship, released as a standalone single in 2023
- Mythos 'N DJ Cosmo, released as a single in 1999

== See also ==
- List of number-one hits of 1984 (Germany)
- List of number-one singles from the 1980s (New Zealand)
