= Girls Just Want to Have Fun (film) =

1985 American film by Alan Metter

- Theatrical release poster
- Directed by: Alan Metter
- Written by: Amy Spies
- Produced by: Chuck Russell
- Starring: Sarah Jessica Parker; Lee Montgomery; Morgan Woodward; Jonathan Silverman; Helen Hunt
- Cinematography: Thomas E. Ackerman
- Edited by: Lorenzo DeStefano; David Rawlins
- Music by: Thomas Newman
- Production company: New World Pictures
- Distributed by: New World Pictures
- Release date: April 12, 1985
- Running time: 90 minutes
- Country: United States
- Language: English
- Budget: Less than $5 million
- Box office: $6.3 million

Girls Just Want to Have Fun is a 1985 American romantic comedy dance film directed by Alan Metter and distributed by New World Pictures. It was written by Amy Spies and stars Sarah Jessica Parker, Lee Montgomery, Morgan Woodward, Jonathan Silverman, Shannen Doherty, and Helen Hunt. Its story follows Janey, a new girl in town who meets Lynne and discovers they both share a passion for dancing and the TV show Dance TV. Together the two enter a competition to be a new Dance TV regular couple; however, Janey's father does not approve.

The film was produced by Chuck Russell and was released on April 12, 1985. It grossed $1.7 million in its opening weekend and $6.3 million worldwide, against a budget of $5 million. Despite this, the film was regularly aired on cable TV for several years and has become a cult film.

== Plot ==
Janey Glenn is an army brat whose father Robert has retired from the Army and relocated to Chicago, home of her favorite dance show Dance TV. At her Catholic girls' school, she quickly makes a new friend in Lynne Stone, a fellow fan of Dance TV. Although Robert nixes the idea of her going to downtown Chicago to try out for Dance TV, Janey accompanies Lynne to the auditions anyway.

At the auditions, spoiled rich Natalie Sands becomes the enemy when she narrowly misses Lynne while parking her car. Auditions are going well until Lynne's partner is cut (Natalie bribed Lynne's partner to sabotage her). Janey and local high schooler Jeff shine, and are partnered together once they make the finals. He loves to dance, though he feels pressured to attend trade school after graduation, as his father did before him.

Initially, Janey and Jeff butt heads due to their disparate upbringings. Despite his natural ability, he has never taken a class, while she has been taking both gymnastics and dance classes for ten years. Helping them to get off on the wrong foot is also Janey's inability to practice, due to her strict father's rules. Things are further complicated by Natalie's meddling. She discovers Janey skipped choir practice to meet Jeff and calls her father to tell, posing as a Sister (teacher in Catholic school).

An opportunity for both girls to get back at Natalie presents itself when Jeff is invited to her coming-out party. They make 150 copies of her invitation (provided by Jeff's best friend Drew) and give them to odd characters all over town. Jeff and Drew attend the party, watching the chaos ensue when all of the oddballs with invites show up (as do Lynne, Janey, and Jeff's sister Maggie, watching from the window).

Janey and Jeff become close through their rehearsals. One night, he tells her to meet him at a club, not the rehearsal studio. While enjoying some unstructured dance time, Jeff is taken away by a girl who locks her keys in her car. Meanwhile, a large admirer moves in on Janey. On Jeff's return, a fight ensues, Jeff sucker-punches the much larger man, and they run out of the club together. Once at Janey's, she is aglow over her life now: she is in the running to become a Dance TV regular and has a great best friend as well as a boyfriend. They finally kiss before she excitedly runs inside.

Given the total wreck the party became, the rivalry with Natalie has intensified. She convinces her father to become more involved in ensuring her win. This is an easy feat, as her father owns the company that Jeff's father works for. One day, Natalie's father, J.P. Sands, corners Jeff and tells him that if Natalie does not win, his father will lose his job. This puts him in a bad mood and he argues with Janey when he arrives at rehearsal. Her mood quickly matches his when she arrives home and, sneaking into the house, she finds that her father has installed a security system. He then grounds her, making it virtually impossible for her to attend the dance contest final the next day.

Meanwhile, Jeff's surly attitude and decreased desire to be in the contest are noticed by his father. When he finally gets his son to talk, he simply asks if he can win the contest. When Jeff answers yes, he is told to do so and not worry about his father's job. However, Janey is still under heavy restrictions and does not know Jeff has changed his mind. However, her little brother brings her a message that Jeff will compete and she employs Lynne to sneak her out of the house.

Once Lynne arrives, Janey cuts the wires to the security system and escapes the guard dog. When they arrive at the station, Janey barely makes the beginning of the show, embracing and kissing Jeff as she arrives. The show begins and the competition is underway. At home, her family turns on the television and sees her dancing. Her father, furious, storms out, heading to the studio. Meanwhile, Jeff's father watches the show from his neighborhood pub, surrounded by friends cheering on Jeff and Janey.

After all of the dancers have performed on the live show, the decision comes back: there is a tie between Janey and Jeff and Natalie and her partner. A dance-off ensues. Natalie goes first and when done, strolls off the stage proudly, believing she has won. But Janey tells Jeff "Let's do it", they do a series of synchronized gymnastics she has taught him over their time together. When the judges deliberate again, the decision is unanimous: Jeff and Janey win.

Natalie is furious and begins to berate her partner over costing her the contest. When she goes to her father to complain, he finally puts his foot down and tells his spoiled daughter to shut up, to her amazement. When Janey spots her father in the studio, she thinks she is in for trouble, but he smiles and shows his enthusiasm for her talent. Miss Dance TV is called to the stage and when she enters, it is none other than Lynne, who has taken the reins when the former Miss Dance TV quit during the show.

== Cast ==
- Sarah Jessica Parker as Janey Glenn
- Lee Montgomery as Jeff Malene
- Morgan Woodward as J.P. Sands
- Jonathan Silverman as Drew Boreman
- Shannen Doherty as Maggie Malene
- Helen Hunt as Lynne Stone
- Ed Lauter as Colonel Robert Glenn
- Holly Gagnier as Natalie Sands
- Lee Arnone as Mrs. Lemsky
- Margaret Howell as Mrs. Glenn
- Terence McGovern as Ira
- Biff Yeager as Mr. Malene
- Kristi Somers as Rikki
- Robin Antin as Dancer
- Stuart Fratkin as Sam
- Gina Gershon, Bruce Goldstein, Scott Coffey, and Wayne Bascomb as Dancers (uncredited)
- Cyndi Lauper as Woman In Diner (uncredited)
- Robert Downey Jr. as Punk Party Crasher (uncredited)
- Richard Blade as DTV Host

== Production ==
In July 1984 New World announced they would make a film inspired by Cyndi Lauper's hit song "Girls Just Want to Have Fun". The company bought the rights to the original 1979 song and title from songwriter Robert Hazard's publishing company, but Lauper said she did not want to appear in the film and refused to allow her version to be used. The filmmakers were not allowed to use the changes that Lauper made to the song, including the addition of several lyrics.

In October the studio announced Sarah Jessica Parker was starring; she was known at the time for the TV series Square Pegs. Parker said she agreed to do the film because the (uncredited) screenwriter, Janis Hirsch, was one of the writers on Square Pegs.

"Janis wasn't into depicting people my age being stupid," said Parker. "I was impressed with her fondness for two best friends who aren't competitive."

Helen Hunt said "They were looking for Goldie (Hawn) types when I was called in. But the director (Alan Metter) pulled me aside and said, 'Sarah would kill to work with you.' It was really cool. Because I knew she wanted me to do the role, I felt I had the support to overcome my Sarah Lawrence looks."

Hunt said she was allowed to "get real creative with who Lynne was... [I] went out and bought all these European magazines—then I did everything that wasn't in them.... I felt a responsibility to bring a sense of fun into the picture. And I knew that to do that, I had to have it for myself and then spread it around. So I brought Tofuti (the healthy ice cream) to the set and got a lot of tapes from Tower Records. It helped. When you're making a comedy and it's 2 in the morning and you're tired and nothing's going right, there's no way you can cut ahead and think, 'Boy, this is going to be exciting when it comes out'."

== Reception ==
=== Critical ===
The film received generally poor to mixed reviews. While certain critics considered the "cheesiness" factor a reason to watch the film, others said it was not a successful addition to the "80s teen movie" genre.

The New York Times called it "standard high school antics" where Metter "has a lighthearted if unremarkable style. The best thing he does here is to assemble a cute cast and simply let the kids bubble along. Helen Hunt is a real scene-stealer."

The Philadelphia Inquirer said "Its main characters are appealing and well-acted" and has "a very clever parody of rock TV shows" but "degenerates into a mirthless comedy about young love and the generation gap, with a few feeble dance sequences thrown in to give viewers a chance to ogle young girls in leotards."

The Los Angeles Times called it "infectious good fun".

On the review aggregator website Rotten Tomatoes, 40% of 15 critics' reviews are positive, with an average rating of 4.5/10.

=== Box office ===
The film opened at number ten at the box office in its first week making $1.6 million.

== Home media ==
The VHS release featured an unintentional error: the runtime is listed as 95 minutes on the case, and 94 minutes on the cassette label.

The film was released on DVD by Image Entertainment on September 27, 2011 and on Blu-ray on April 3, 2012. As of 2023, it is available to stream on Amazon Prime Video in the US and some European countries.

== Soundtrack ==
Though the 1985 film's title is based on the 1983 hit by Cyndi Lauper, Lauper's version of the song does not play in the film due to licensing restrictions. Instead, a cover of the song by Deborah Galli, Tami Holbrook, and Meredith Marshall is featured. The most popular song from the soundtrack is "(Come On) Shout", performed by session singer, Alex Brown. The song and the accompanying music video brought Brown some momentary fame during the time of the movie's release.

== Related projects ==
=== Film remake ===
In 2009, 20th Century Fox and Lakeshore Entertainment announced they were working on a remake of the film and had hired Michelle Morgan to write the script. Later, on April 20, 2023, Village Roadshow Pictures announced that a remake of the film would be directed by Elizabeth Banks and written by Marja-Lewis Ryan.

=== Musical ===
In November 2023, a jukebox musical based on the film was announced to be in production. The musical is a collaboration between the companies Lively McCabe Entertainment and Primary Wave, with a book written by Lauren Marcus and M. Dickson.
