= Key Key Karimba =

Single by Baltimora

from the album Survivor in Love
- B-side: "Key Key Karimba (Children Version)"
- Released: 1987
- Genre: Italo disco; synth-pop
- Length: 4:01
- Label: EMI Italiana
- Songwriter: Maurizio Bassi
- Producer: Maurizio Bassi

Baltimora singles chronology
"Juke Box Boy" (1986)	"Key Key Karimba" (1987)	"Global Love" (1987)

Music video
- "Key Key Karimba" on YouTube

"Key Key Karimba" is a song by Italo disco act Baltimora, released in 1987 as the lead single from their second and final studio album Survivor in Love. The song was written and produced by Maurizio Bassi.

== Background ==
After the success created by Baltimora's 1985 debut hit "Tarzan Boy", the act's following singles were not as successful. "Woody Boogie" found moderate European success, but the singles "Living in the Background", as well as the 1986 single "Juke Box Boy" failed to make a huge impact. "Key Key Karimba" was an attempt for Baltimora to make a comeback after the disappointing sales of the previous singles. Despite performing the song on various TV shows, as well as a music video, the single failed to make any impact worldwide. The song peaked at #37 in Italy though, after "Juke Box Boy" had entered the Top 15 the year before. The two follow-up singles from the Survivor in Love album, "Global Love" and "Call Me in the Heart of the Night" were both commercial failures, and Baltimora disbanded.

Unlike most of Baltimora's material, the usual music composer Maurizio Bassi also wrote the lyrics to the song. Baltimora's usual lyricist was Naimy Hackett. "Key Key Karimba" remains the only Baltimora song to be credited to Bassi alone. The song was recorded and mixed at the Morning Studio in Milan and the overdubs were completed at Abbey Road Studios in London. Although it was written and produced by Bassi, Jimmy McShane still lip synced the music in both the music video and during live performances.

== Release ==
The single was released on both 45 and EP vinyl, via EMI, in Europe, Mexico and Australasia. These European countries mainly consisted of Italy, Germany and Spain. It was marketed, manufactured and distributed by EMI. The single's cover design was done by Umberto Grati and EMI Creative Services. All versions of the 45 vinyl edition featured "Key Key Karimba (Children Version)" as the B-Side. This version was exclusive to the single and has remained exclusive since. This version removes the lead vocal, and only features the children's choir of the chorus in places, with the rest being instrumental, including the song's verses.

In Spain the song was released as a promotional only 45 vinyl. In Mexico, a promotional 45 vinyl was issued, featuring "Survivor in Love" as the B-Side. This was an album track taken from the same-titled album, and was written by Bassi, with lyrics by McShane. On this Mexican release, the song's were labelled "Karimba" and "Sobreviviente Enamorado" respectively. In Italy a promotional 7" vinyl was also issued as a double artist set. It featured the artist Off on the A-Side with the song "Electrica Salsa (Baba Baba)" and Baltimora with "Key Key Karimba" on the B-Side. This release was connected to Bari '87 TV.

The EP vinyl version was released in Italy, Germany and Australasia, with a promotional EP vinyl also being released in Spain. All featured the same track-listing, consisting of the full six-minute album version of "Key Key Karimba", essentially an extended remix, the "Children's Version" of the song, and the four-minute "Radio Version" of the song too, which was used on the 45 vinyl releases.

== Promotion ==
"Key Key Karimba" had a promotional music video created, and this was the last Baltimora made. Since being uploaded unofficially onto YouTube in mid-2008, the video has gained 108,000 views. Combining the children's choir used in the song's chorus, the video features a class of schoolchildren looking bored, before Jimmy McShane arrives singing and dancing. For the first chorus the children stand-up and join in with the singing. One highlighted young girl, by the second verse, transforms into a woman, possibly in fantasy only, who dances with McShane, and by the second chorus the remaining schoolchildren have become young adults too. At the end of the video, McShane and the rest of the adults are dancing together.

The song was also mimed on various TV shows, mainly Italian. McShane performed on Mixitalia, Azzurro 87, Rai TV, Tutto and WWF Club.

== Critical reception ==
Upon its release, Radiocorriere TV called the track "disposable dance" which is "written with American professionalism".

== Formats ==
7-inch single

1. "Key Key Karimba" - 4:01
2. "Key Key Karimba" (Children Version) - 4:50

7-inch single (Spanish promo)

1. "Key Key Karimba" - 4:01
2. "Key Key Karimba" (Children Version) - 4:50

7-inch single (Mexican promo)

1. "Karimba (Key Key Karimba)" - 4:01
2. "Sobreviviente Enamorado (Survivor in Love)" - 4:59

12-inch single

1. "Key Key Karimba" - 6:00
2. "Key Key Karimba (Children Version)" - 4:50
3. "Key Key Karimba (Radio Version)" - 4:01

== Personnel ==
- Maurizio Bassi – master keyboard, producer, Macintosh programming, synthesizer, Akai musical equipment, arranger, writer
- Gaetano Leandro – synthesizers (Fairlight II, Prophet V, Xpander Obereim Ppg Synth)
- Giorgio Cocilovo – electric, shadow MIDI guitar
- Dino D'Autorio – electric, fretless bass
- Gabriele Melotti – drums, drum programming, percussion
- Betty Vittori, Malcolm McDonald, Marco Ferradini – backing vocals
- Renato Cantele – chief engineer, sound engineer
- Alfio Galimberti – assistant engineer
- Giambattista Lizzori – engineer
- Umberto Grati, EMI Creative Services – cover design

== Charts ==
=== Weekly charts ===
Chart (1987)	Peak position
Finland (Suomen virallinen lista)	19
Italy Airplay (Music & Media)	2
