= Automatic Love =

Automatic Love may refer to:

- "Automatic Love", song by Minipop
- "Automatic Love", song by Die Form
- "Automatic Love", song by Kristeen Young from Breasticles
- "Automatic Love", song by Kylie Minogue from Kylie Minogue
- "Automatic Love", song by Gore Gore Girls from Up All Night
- "Automatic Love", song by Key Motion
- "Automatic Lover", a 1978 spaco disco song by Dee D. Jackson
