= Joseph Kahn videography =

List of videos directed by Joseph Kahn

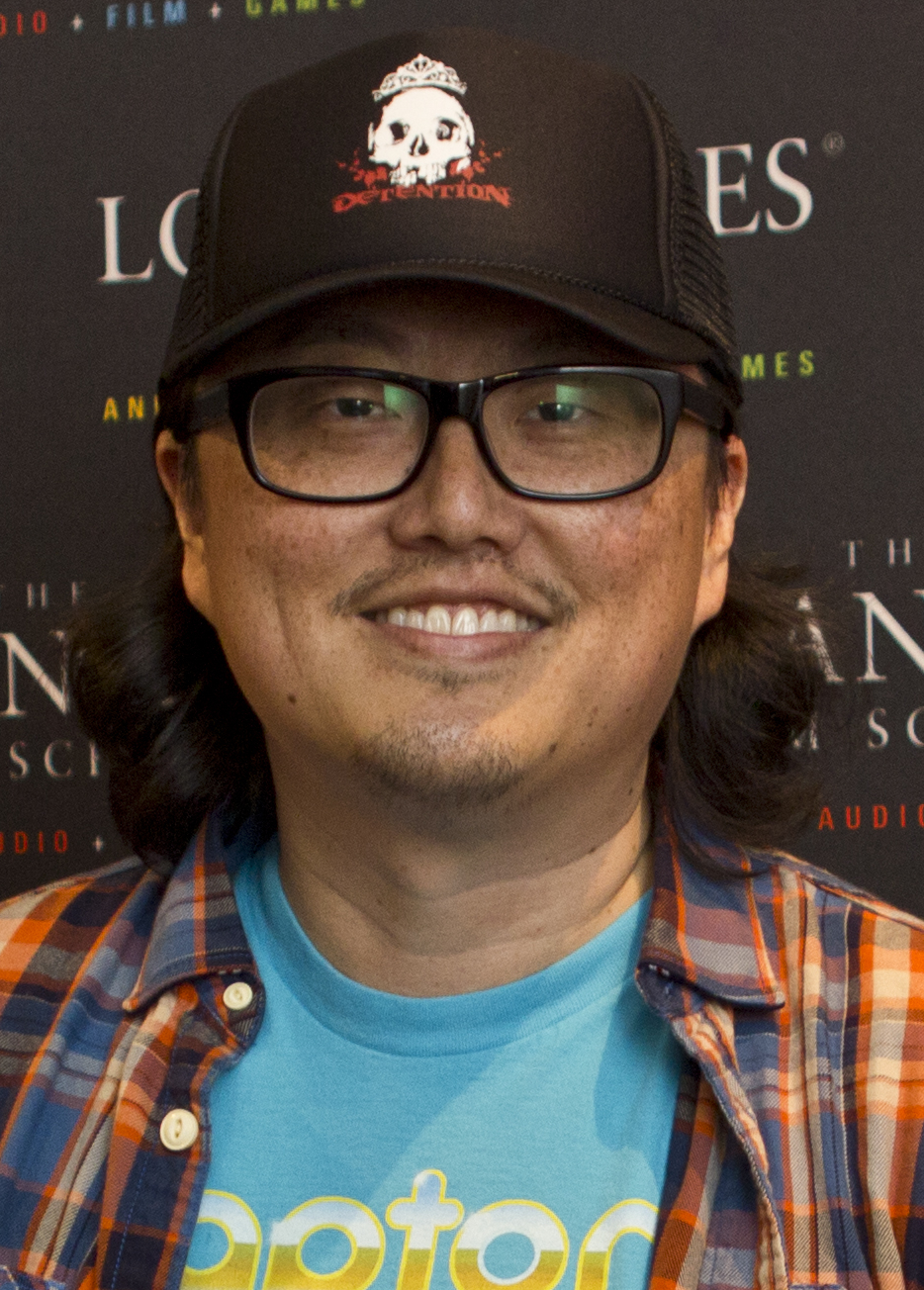
Kahn in 2012

Korean-American director Joseph Kahn has directed 187 music videos, 5 films, and 2 television shows. He is also credited as a cinematographer in 4 music videos.

Kahn is also a cinematographer, executive producer, screenwriter and editor for various films and music videos.

Kahn has won 9 awards for his work, including the Grammy Award for Best Music Video for American singer-songwriter Taylor Swift's "Bad Blood" and American rapper Eminem's "Without Me".

== Music videos ==
Key
†	Indicates music videos not directed by Joseph Kahn

Title	Year	Artist(s)	Notes	Ref(s)
"The Basement"	1990	Pain Teens		
"Ghost Town"	1992	Rake's Progress		
"Crossfire"	1993	Die Krupps		
"Fatherland"	1993	Die Krupps		
"To the Hilt"	1993	Die Krupps		
"You Don't Hear Me Doe"	1993	DMG		
"Straight Gangsterism"	1993	Geto Boys		
"Funky Lil Brotha"	1994	2 Low		
"Ghetto Funk"	1994	5th Ward Boyz		
"You Gotta Be"	1994	Ahmad		
"Back in the Day"	1994	Ahmad		
"Bloodsuckers"	1994	Die Krupps featuring Biohazard		
"Afraid"	1994	Willie Nelson		
"What Up G?"	1994	Retarted Elf		
"Long Gone"	1994	Widowmaker		
"Gimme Yours"	1995	AZ		
"Year of the Fly MC"	1995	Clever Jeff		
"Real Hip Hop"	1995	Das EFX		
"Soakin' Wet"	1995	Distinguished Gentlemen		
"Faith"	1995	Lords of the Underground		
"Neva Faded"	1995	Lords of the Underground		
"All We Got Iz Us"	1995	Onyx		
"Last Dayz"	1995	Onyx		
"Stick by Me"	1995	Ruffnexx Sound System		
"Locusts"	1995	Spahn Ranch		
"Without Love"	1995	Veronica		
"Hand of the Dead Body"	1995	Scarface featuring Ice Cube		
"So Whatcha Gone Do Now"	1995	Public Enemy		
"Do Or Die"	1996	AZ		
"Mo Money, Mo Murder, Mo Homicide"	1996	AZ		
"Peek in the Drawers"	1996	Interstate		
"Hustler's Theme"	1996	Smoothe da Hustler		
"Hang 'Em High"	1996	Sadat X		
"I Like"	1996	Montell Jordan featuring Slick Rick		
"Sky Plus"	1996	Nylon Moon		
"If Your Girl Only Knew"	1996	Aaliyah	Also credited as cinematographer	
"Hit Me Off"	1996	New Edition		
"What's Love Got to Do with It"	1996	Warren G featuring Adina Howard		
"Let's Get the Mood Right"	1996	Johnny Gill		
"I'm Still in Love with You"	1996	New Edition		
"Kissin' You"	1996	Total		
"You Can't Stop the Reign"	1996	Shaq		
"Let's Get Down"	1996	Tony! Toni! Toné! featuring DJ Quik	Also credited as cinematographer	
"A.D.I.D.A.S"	1997	Korn		
"The World Is Mine"	1997	Ice Cube	Also credited as cinematographer	
"Quand J'ai Peur De Tout"	1997	Patricia Kaas		
"Last Cup of Sorrow"	1997	Faith No More		
"Tha Doggfather"	1997	Snoop Doggy Dogg		
"True to Myself"	1997	Eric Benet		
"Everybody (Backstreet's Back)"	1997	Backstreet Boys		
"Big Bad Mamma"	1997	Foxy Brown featuring Dru Hill		
"Triumph" †	1997	Wu-Tang Clan featuring Cappadonna	Directed by Brett Ratner Cinematographer	
"Someone"	1997	SWV featuring Puff Daddy		
"If I Could Teach the World"	1997	Bone Thugs-n-Harmony		
"Hot Spot"	1998	Foxy Brown		
"All the Man That I Need"	1998	Shernette May		
"Trippin'"	1998	Total		
"Bedtime"	1998	Usher		
"I Can Do That"	1998	Montell Jordan		
"Let's Ride"	1998	Montell Jordan featuring Master P and Silkk the Shocker		
"What You Want"	1998	Mase featuring Total		
"The Boy Is Mine"	1998	Brandy and Monica		
"The First Night"	1998	Monica		
"Space Lord"	1998	Monster Magnet		
"On a Day Like Today"	1998	Bryan Adams		
"Living Dead Girl"	1998	Rob Zombie	Co-directed with Rob Zombie	
"Quiet Storm"	1999	Mobb Deep		
"How Do I Deal"	1999	Jennifer Love Hewitt		
"Powertrip"	1999	Monster Magnet		
"Girlfriend/Boyfriend"	1999	Blackstreet featuring Janet Jackson, Ja Rule and Eve		
"Someday"	1999	Sugar Ray		
"Larger Than Life"	1999	Backstreet Boys		
"If You Can't Rock Me"	1999	The Brian Setzer Orchestra		
"Muscle Museum"	1999	Muse		
"Be a Man"	2000	Hole		
"Say My Name"	2000	Destiny's Child		
"Jumpin', Jumpin'"	2000	Destiny's Child		
"Thong Song"	2000	Sisqó		
"Someday Out of the Blue"	2000	Elton John	Co-directed with Bibo Bergeron	
"I Turn to You"	2000	Christina Aguilera		
"Doesn't Really Matter"	2000	Janet Jackson		
"I Need You"	2000	LeAnn Rimes	Co-directed with Joe Rey	
"The Way You Love Me"	2000	Faith Hill		
"Irresistible"	2000	The Corrs		
"It Ain't"	2000	Scarface		
"Protect Ya Neck (The Jump Off)"	2000	Wu-Tang Clan		
"Gravel Pit"	2000	Wu-Tang Clan		
"South Side"	2000	Moby featuring Gwen Stefani		
"Stronger"	2000	Britney Spears		
"Candela"	2001	Chayanne		
"Request + Line"	2001	The Black Eyed Peas featuring Macy Gray		
"Between Angels and Insects"	2001	Papa Roach		
"Elevation"	2001	U2		
"Stuck in a Moment You Can't Get Out Of"	2001	U2		
"Fly Away from Here"	2001	Aerosmith		
"Purple Pills"	2001	D12		
"Baby, Come Over (This Is Our Night)"	2001	Samantha Mumba		
"Hero"	2001	Enrique Iglesias		
"Who We Be"	2001	DMX		
"Cherry Lips"	2001	Garbage		
"Freeek!"	2002	George Michael		
"We Are All Made of Stars"	2002	Moby		
"Motivation"	2002	Sum 41	Co-directed with Super America; Also credited as a producer	
"Without Me"	2002	Eminem		
"Boy (I Need You)"	2002	Mariah Carey featuring Cam'ron		
"Everyday" †	2002	Bon Jovi	Directed by Todd Kellstein Cinematographer and executive producer	
"X Gon' Give It to Ya"	2003	DMX		
"Damaged"	2003	TLC		
"Work It"	2003	Nelly featuring Justin Timberlake		
"White Flag"	2003	Dido		
"Juramento"	2003	Ricky Martin		
"Light Your Ass on Fire"	2003	Busta Rhymes featuring Pharrell Williams		
"Get Yourself High"	2003	The Chemical Brothers featuring k-os		
"Toxic"	2004	Britney Spears		
"Always on My Mind"	2004	Alsou		
"Always"	2004	Blink-182		
"La La"	2004	Ashlee Simpson		
"(Can't Get My) Head Around You"	2004	The Offspring		
"Spoiled"	2005	Joss Stone		
"Lonely No More"	2005	Rob Thomas		
"Feels Just Like It Should"	2005	Jamiroquai		
"Incomplete"	2005	Backstreet Boys		
"Behind These Hazel Eyes"	2005	Kelly Clarkson		
"Walk Away"	2006	Kelly Clarkson		
"No Promises"	2006	Shayne Ward		
"Little Razorblade"	2006	The Pink Spiders		
"Knights of Cydonia"	2006	Muse		
"Get Up"	2006	Ciara featuring Chamillionaire		
"So Excited"	2006	Janet Jackson featuring Khia		
"The Sweet Escape"	2006	Gwen Stefani featuring Akon		
"Never Again"	2007	Kelly Clarkson		
"Ayo Technology"	2007	50 Cent featuring Justin Timberlake and Timbaland		
"Ghosts"	2008	Ladytron		
"Forever"	2008	Chris Brown		
"When I Grow Up"	2008	The Pussycat Dolls		
"I Hate This Part"	2008	The Pussycat Dolls		
"Womanizer"	2008	Britney Spears		
"Eh, Eh (Nothing Else I Can Say)"	2009	Lady Gaga		
"LoveGame"	2009	Lady Gaga		
"I Did It for Love"	2009	BoA		
"Waking Up in Vegas"	2009	Katy Perry		
"We Made You"	2009	Eminem		
"Already Gone"	2009	Kelly Clarkson		
"Drop It Low"	2009	Ester Dean featuring Chris Brown		
"Fancy Free"	2009	Sun Ho		
"I Can Transform Ya"	2009	Chris Brown featuring Lil Wayne and Swizz Beatz		
"Crawl"	2009	Chris Brown		
"Everybody Hurts"	2010	Helping Haiti		
"All the Lovers"	2010	Kylie Minogue		
"Misery"	2010	Maroon 5		
"Misery" (UK version)	2010	Maroon 5	Co-directed with Don Tyler	
"Love the Way You Lie"	2010	Eminem featuring Rihanna		
"Poison"	2010	Nicole Scherzinger		
"Pretty Girl Rock"	2010	Keri Hilson		
"Kush"	2010	Dr. Dre featuring Snoop Dogg and Akon		
"Space Bound"	2011	Eminem		
"Gingham Check"	2012	AKB48		
"Uza"	2012	AKB48		
"Candy"	2012	Robbie Williams		
"Got Me Good"	2012	Ciara		
"In My City"	2013	Priyanka Chopra		
"#Beautiful"	2013	Mariah Carey featuring Miguel		
"Perfume"	2013	Britney Spears		
"Can't Remember to Forget You"	2014	Shakira featuring Rihanna		
"Blank Space"	2014	Taylor Swift		
"Bad Blood"	2015	Taylor Swift featuring Kendrick Lamar		
"Wildest Dreams"	2015	Taylor Swift		
"Wherever I Go"	2016	OneRepublic		
"Forever Country"	2016	Artists of Then, Now & Forever		
"Out of the Woods"	2016	Taylor Swift		
"Look What You Made Me Do"	2017	Taylor Swift		
"...Ready for It?"	2017	Taylor Swift		
"Thunder"	2017	Imagine Dragons		
"What Lovers Do"	2017	Maroon 5 featuring SZA		
"End Game"	2018	Taylor Swift featuring Ed Sheeran and Future		
"Delicate"	2018	Taylor Swift		
"Dinero"	2018	Jennifer Lopez featuring DJ Khaled and Cardi B		
"Three Little Birds"	2018	Maroon 5		
"Last Hurrah"	2019	Bebe Rexha		
"Just One Lifetime"	2019	Sting and Shaggy		
"Celebrate"	2019	DJ Khaled featuring Post Malone and Travis Scott		
"Just Us"	2019	DJ Khaled featuring SZA		
"Torn"	2019	Ava Max		
"All I Want for Christmas Is You" (Make My Wish Come True Edition)	2019	Mariah Carey		
"What a Man Gotta Do"	2020	Jonas Brothers		
"Iffy"	2022	Chris Brown		
"Maybe You're the Problem"	2022	Ava Max		
"Super Freaky Girl"	2022	Nicki Minaj		
"Praising You" (Part II)	2023	Rita Ora featuring Fatboy Slim		
"Human"	2024	Lenny Kravitz		
"Sandbox"	2025	The All-American Rejects		
"Type Dangerous"	2025	Mariah Carey		
"Click"	2026	Jisoo		

== Filmography ==
=== Film ===
Year	Title	Director	Writer	Notes	Ref(s)
2004	Torque	Yes	No	Also made a cameo as "Passenger in Train" (uncredited)	
2011	Detention	Yes	Yes		
2015	Power/Rangers	Yes	Yes	Also editor	
2017	Bodied	Yes	Story		
2024	Ick	Yes	Yes		

=== Television ===
Title	Year	Episode(s)
2016	Sweet/Vicious	"The Blueprint" (Co-directed with Rebecca Thomas)
2016	Sweet/Vicious	"The Writing's on the Wall"
2017	Crazy Ex-Girlfriend	"Josh's Ex-Girlfriend is Crazy"
2019	Happy!	"Blitzkrieg!!!"
