= Living in the Background =

Living in the Background may refer to:

- Living in the Background (album), the debut album of pop group Baltimora
- "Living in the Background" (song), the title track and third single from the album
