= List of number-one hits of 1985 (Flanders) =

These hits topped the Ultratop 50 in the Flanders region of Belgium in 1985.

Date	Artist	Title
January 5	Band Aid	"Do They Know It's Christmas?"
January 12	Band Aid	"Do They Know It's Christmas?"
January 19	Band Aid	"Do They Know It's Christmas?"
January 26	Murray Head	"One Night in Bangkok"
February 2	Murray Head	"One Night in Bangkok"
February 9	Murray Head	"One Night in Bangkok"
February 16	Jermaine Jackson	"Do What You Do"
February 23	Jermaine Jackson	"Do What You Do"
March 2	Tears for Fears	"Shout"
March 9	Tears for Fears	"Shout"
March 16	Tears for Fears	"Shout"
March 23	Modern Talking	"You're My Heart, You're My Soul"
March 30	Modern Talking	"You're My Heart, You're My Soul"
April 6	Modern Talking	"You're My Heart, You're My Soul"
April 13	Modern Talking	"You're My Heart, You're My Soul"
April 20	Modern Talking	"You're My Heart, You're My Soul"
April 27	USA for Africa	"We Are the World"
May 4	USA for Africa	"We Are the World"
May 11	USA for Africa	"We Are the World"
May 18	USA for Africa	"We Are the World"
May 25	USA for Africa	"We Are the World"
June 1	USA for Africa	"We Are the World"
June 8	Bobbysocks!	"Let It Swing"
June 15	Paul Hardcastle	"19"
June 22	Paul Hardcastle	"19"
June 29	Paul Hardcastle	"19"
July 6	Bruce Springsteen	"Dancing in the Dark"
July 13	Bruce Springsteen	"Dancing in the Dark"
July 20	Bruce Springsteen	"Dancing in the Dark"
July 27	Bruce Springsteen	"Dancing in the Dark"
August 3	Bruce Springsteen	"Dancing in the Dark"
August 10	Bruce Springsteen	"I'm on Fire"
August 17	Baltimora	"Tarzan Boy"
August 24	Baltimora	"Tarzan Boy"
August 31	Baltimora	"Tarzan Boy"
September 7	Baltimora	"Tarzan Boy"
September 14	Madonna	"Into the Groove"
September 21	Madonna	"Into the Groove"
September 28	Madonna	"Into the Groove"
October 5	Madonna	"Into the Groove"
October 12	Madonna	"Into the Groove"
October 19	Stevie Wonder	"Part-Time Lover"
October 26	Nana Mouskouri	"Only Love"
November 2	Nana Mouskouri	"Only Love"
November 9	Nana Mouskouri	"Only Love"
November 16	Nana Mouskouri	"Only Love"
November 23	Nana Mouskouri	"Only Love"
November 30	Nana Mouskouri	"Only Love"
December 7	Nana Mouskouri	"Only Love"
December 14	A-ha	"Take On Me"
December 21	Elton John	"Nikita"
December 28	Elton John	"Nikita"

== See also ==
- 1985 in music
