= List of European number-one hits of 1985 =

This is a list of the European Hot 100 Singles and European Top 100 Albums number ones of 1985, as published by Eurotipsheet magazine (renamed Music & Media in April 1986).

== Chart history ==
Key
†	Indicates best-performing single and album of 1985

Issue date	Song	Artist	Album	Artist	Ref.
7 January	"Ghostbusters"	Ray Parker Jr.	Private Dancer	Tina Turner	
14 January	"I Just Called to Say I Love You"	Stevie Wonder	Welcome to the Pleasuredome	Frankie Goes to Hollywood	
21 January	"Ghostbusters"	Ray Parker Jr.	Make It Big	Wham!	
28 January	"Ghostbusters"	Ray Parker Jr.	Arena	Duran Duran	
4 February	"Like a Virgin"	Madonna	Arena	Duran Duran	
11 February	"Like a Virgin"	Madonna	Welcome to the Pleasuredome	Frankie Goes to Hollywood	
18 February	"Like a Virgin"	Madonna	Diamond Life	Sade	
25 February	"Like a Virgin"	Madonna	Diamond Life	Sade	
4 March	"Like a Virgin"	Madonna	Diamond Life	Sade	
11 March	"Easy Lover"	Philip Bailey and Phil Collins	Diamond Life	Sade	
18 March	"Easy Lover"	Philip Bailey and Phil Collins	No Jacket Required	Phil Collins	
25 March	"Easy Lover"	Philip Bailey and Phil Collins	No Jacket Required	Phil Collins	
1 April	"Easy Lover"	Philip Bailey and Phil Collins	No Jacket Required	Phil Collins	
8 April	"Easy Lover"	Philip Bailey and Phil Collins	No Jacket Required	Phil Collins	
15 April	"Easy Lover"	Philip Bailey and Phil Collins	No Jacket Required	Phil Collins	
22 April	"We Are the World" †	USA for Africa	No Jacket Required	Phil Collins	
29 April	"We Are the World" †	USA for Africa	No Jacket Required	Phil Collins	
6 May	"We Are the World" †	USA for Africa	No Jacket Required	Phil Collins	
13 May	"We Are the World" †	USA for Africa	No Jacket Required	Phil Collins	
20 May	"We Are the World" †	USA for Africa	No Jacket Required	Phil Collins	
27 May	"We Are the World" †	USA for Africa	No Jacket Required	Phil Collins	
3 June	"We Are the World" †	USA for Africa	No Jacket Required	Phil Collins	
10 June	"We Are the World" †	USA for Africa	Brothers in Arms †	Dire Straits	
17 June	"We Are the World" †	USA for Africa	Brothers in Arms †	Dire Straits	
24 June	"We Are the World" †	USA for Africa	Brothers in Arms †	Dire Straits	
1 July	"Live Is Life"	Opus	Brothers in Arms †	Dire Straits	
8 July (Note: The issue dated 8 July 1985 was a double issue.)	"Live Is Life"	Opus	Brothers in Arms †	Dire Straits	
15 July	"Live Is Life"	Opus	Brothers in Arms †	Dire Straits	
22 July (Note: The issue dated 29 July 1985 was a double issue.)	"A View to a Kill"	Duran Duran	Brothers in Arms †	Dire Straits	
29 July	"Live Is Life"	Opus	Brothers in Arms †	Dire Straits	
5 August	"Live Is Life"	Opus	Brothers in Arms †	Dire Straits	
12 August	"Live Is Life"	Opus	Brothers in Arms †	Dire Straits	
19 August	"Tarzan Boy"	Baltimora	Brothers in Arms †	Dire Straits	
26 August	"Tarzan Boy"	Baltimora	Brothers in Arms †	Dire Straits	
2 September	"Tarzan Boy"	Baltimora	Brothers in Arms †	Dire Straits	
9 September	"Tarzan Boy"	Baltimora	Brothers in Arms †	Dire Straits	
16 September	"Tarzan Boy"	Baltimora	Brothers in Arms †	Dire Straits	
23 September	"Tarzan Boy"	Baltimora	Brothers in Arms †	Dire Straits	
30 September	"Tarzan Boy"	Baltimora	Like a Virgin	Madonna	
7 October	"Tarzan Boy"	Baltimora	Brothers in Arms †	Dire Straits	
14 October	"Into the Groove"	Madonna	Brothers in Arms †	Dire Straits	
21 October	"Part-Time Lover"	Stevie Wonder	Brothers in Arms †	Dire Straits	
28 October	"Part-Time Lover"	Stevie Wonder	Brothers in Arms †	Dire Straits	
4 November	"Part-Time Lover"	Stevie Wonder	Brothers in Arms †	Dire Straits	
11 November	"Part-Time Lover"	Stevie Wonder	Brothers in Arms †	Dire Straits	
18 November	"Part-Time Lover"	Stevie Wonder	Like a Virgin	Madonna	
25 November	"Take On Me"	A-ha	Brothers in Arms †	Dire Straits	
2 December	"Take On Me"	A-ha	Brothers in Arms †	Dire Straits	
9 December	"Take On Me"	A-ha	Brothers in Arms †	Dire Straits	
16 December	"Take On Me"	A-ha	Promise	Sade	
23 December	"Take On Me"	A-ha	Promise	Sade	
30 December	No chart published				
