= Millennial whoop =

Vocal melodic pattern alternating between the fifth and third notes in a major scale

Millennial whoop of "California Gurls" in the key of F

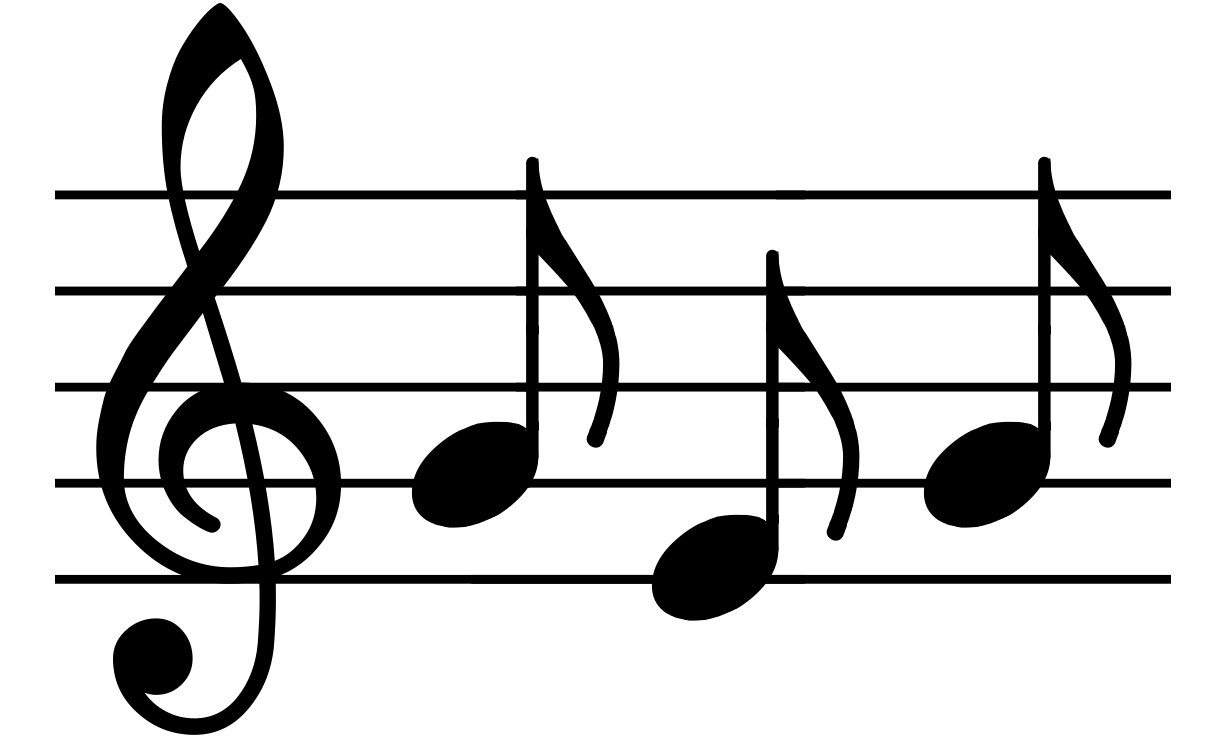
Musical motif of the Millenial whoop

The millennial whoop is a vocal melodic pattern alternating between the fifth note (the dominant) and the third note (the mediant) in a major scale, typically starting on the fifth, in the rhythm of straight 8th-notes, and often using the "wa" and "oh" syllables. It was used extensively in 2010s pop music.

== Overview ==
In the slavishly playlisted, gnat's-attention-span world of daytime radio, the Whoop has become a signalling device, often cropping up bang on cue around the one-minute mark, saying: "Hey wait! Don't run away just yet!"

— Music blogger Gavin Haynes

The term was coined by the musician Patrick Metzger, who described it in a blog entry on The Patterning in August 2016. He suggested that, while the millennial whoop gained popularity from the late 2000s to 2010s, it has probably always been around. An earlier use can be heard in the 1984 song "Jungle Love" by The Time, and, arguably, in Baltimora's 1985 hit "Tarzan Boy".

The 2017 song "Millennial Whoop" by American rock band the Pilgrims was written as a response to the idea of older generations looking down upon the younger for using such tropes: the song makes use of the interval pattern.

== Lawsuit ==
In 2013, songwriter Ally Burnett sued Carly Rae Jepsen and Owl City over their 2012 song "Good Time", arguing similarities to her 2010 song "Ah, It's a Love Song" and its use of the millennial whoop. Jepsen settled out of court.

== Uses ==
Songs where the millennial whoop appears include:

- "Jungle Love" (1984, Morris Day and the Time)
- "Tarzan Boy" (1985, Baltimora) (the B-part of the ABAB-structured chorus)
- "DuckTales" (1987, Mark Mueller)
- "Aaya Mausam Dosti Ka" (1989, Maine Pyar Kiya) (parts similar to "Tarzan Boy")
- "In the Shadows" (2003, The Rasmus)
- "That's What You Get" (2008, Paramore)
- "Use Somebody" (2008, Kings of Leon)
- "Tik Tok" (2009, Kesha)
- "Looking for Paradise" (2009, Alejandro Sanz featuring Alicia Keys)
- "Bad Romance" (2009, Lady Gaga)
- "California Gurls" (2010, Katy Perry)
- "Till the World Ends" (2011, Britney Spears)
- "Good Time" (2012, Carly Rae Jepsen and Owl City)
- "The Mother We Share" (2012, Chvrches)
- "Habits (Stay High)" (2013, Tove Lo)
- "Really Don't Care" (2013, Demi Lovato featuring Cher Lloyd)
- "Ivy" (2016, Frank Ocean)
- "This Is Me" (2017, from The Greatest Showman)

== See also ==
- Nyah nyah nyah nyah nyah nyah
- Harmonic series
