= List of Dutch Top 40 number-one singles of 1985 =

These hits topped the Dutch Top 40 in 1985.

Issue Date	Song	Artist(s)	Reference
5 January	"Do They Know It's Christmas?"	Band Aid	
12 January	"Do They Know It's Christmas?"	Band Aid	
19 January	"Do They Know It's Christmas?"	Band Aid	
26 January	"Easy Lover"	Phil Collins & Philip Bailey	
2 February	"Easy Lover"	Phil Collins & Philip Bailey	
9 February	"Easy Lover"	Phil Collins & Philip Bailey	
16 February	"Easy Lover"	Phil Collins & Philip Bailey	
23 February	"Shout"	Tears For Fears	
2 March	"Shout"	Tears For Fears	
9 March	"Shout"	Tears For Fears	
16 March	"This Is Not America"	David Bowie & Pat Metheny Group	
23 March	"This Is Not America"	David Bowie & Pat Metheny Group	
30 March	"Nightshift"	Commodores	
6 April	"Nightshift"	Commodores	
13 April	"Nightshift"	Commodores	
20 April	"We Are the World"	USA for Africa	
27 April	"We Are the World"	USA for Africa	
4 May	"We Are the World"	USA for Africa	
11 May	"We Are the World"	USA for Africa	
18 May	"We Are the World"	USA for Africa	
25 May	"We Are the World"	USA for Africa	
1 June	"Don't You (Forget About Me)"	Simple Minds	
8 June	"Don't You (Forget About Me)"	Simple Minds	
15 June	"Don't You (Forget About Me)"	Simple Minds	
22 June	"Dancing in the Dark"	Bruce Springsteen	
29 June	"19"	Paul Hardcastle	
6 July	"19"	Paul Hardcastle	
13 July	"19"	Paul Hardcastle	
20 July	"I'm on Fire"	Bruce Springsteen	
27 July	"I'm on Fire"	Bruce Springsteen	
3 August	"I'm on Fire"	Bruce Springsteen	
10 August	"Axel F"	Harold Faltermeyer	
17 August	"Axel F"	Harold Faltermeyer	
24 August	"Waarom fluister ik je naam nog"	Benny Neyman	
31 August	"Tarzan Boy"	Baltimora	
7 September	"Tarzan Boy"	Baltimora	
14 September	"Into the Groove"	Madonna	
21 September	"Into the Groove"	Madonna	
28 September	"Into the Groove"	Madonna	
5 October	"I Got You Babe"	UB40 & Chrissie Hynde	
12 October	"Dancing in the Street"	David Bowie & Mick Jagger	
19 October	"Dancing in the Street"	David Bowie & Mick Jagger	
26 October	"Ticket to the Tropics"	Gerard Joling	
2 November	"Only Love"	Nana Mouskouri	
9 November	"Only Love"	Nana Mouskouri	
16 November	"(I'll Never Be) Maria Magdalena"	Sandra	
23 November	"(I'll Never Be) Maria Magdalena"	Sandra	
30 November	"Take On Me"	a-ha	
7 December	"Nikita"	Elton John	
14 December	"Nikita"	Elton John	
21 December	"Nikita"	Elton John	
28 December	No Top 40 released		

== See also ==
- 1985 in music
