= Patrick Metzger =

Patrick Metzger may refer to:

- Patrick Metzger, Canadian electoral candidate 2006
- Patrick Metzger, music blogger who coined the term Millennial Whoop in 2016
- Patrick Metzger, German drummer (born 1979)
