= Joseph Kahn (director) =

South Korean-American music video director

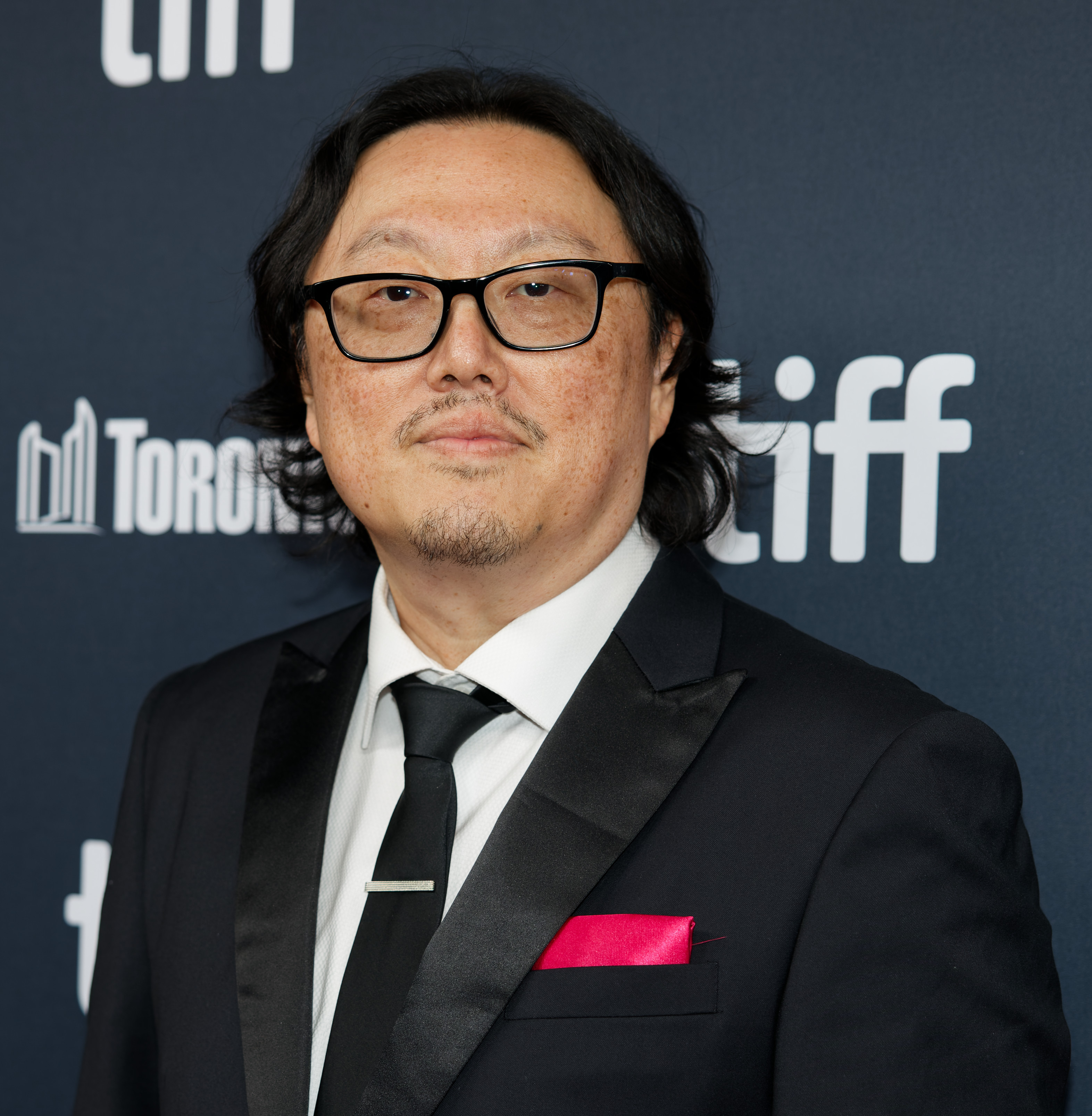
- Kahn at the 2024 Toronto International Film Festival
- Born: Ahn Jun-hee; October 12, 1972 (age 54); Busan, South Korea
- Citizenship: South Korea; United States
- Occupations: Film director, music video director
- Years active: 1990–present

Korean name
- Hangul: 안준희
- Hanja: 安俊囍
- RR: An Junhui
- MR: An Chunhŭi
- Website: www.josephkahn.com

Joseph Kahn (born Ahn Jun-hee, Korean: 안준희; October 12, 1972) is a South Korean-born American director known for his music videos. He has worked with various famous artists such as George Michael, Taylor Swift, Britney Spears, Garbage, Eminem, Backstreet Boys, Imagine Dragons, Lady Gaga, Rob Thomas, Snoop Dogg, Chris Brown, Kelly Clarkson, Ava Max, Mariah Carey, Destiny's Child, and Jisoo.

== Early life ==
Kahn was born Ahn Jun-hee in Busan, South Korea. His family spent part of his childhood there and in Livorno, Italy until moving to Jersey Village, Texas, a suburb of Houston, when Joseph was seven. After graduating from Jersey Village High School in 1990, Kahn went to New York University's Tisch School of the Arts but dropped out after a year. Returning to Houston, began to direct hip hop music videos.

== Career ==
=== Music videos ===
Kahn's videography spans thirty years. In the mid-1990s, he directed music videos for artists including Aaliyah, Ice Cube, Backstreet Boys and Snoop Dogg. In 2003, Kahn won his first Grammy for Eminem's "Without Me" video which also won the MTV VMA's Best Video of the Year, as well as Best Direction. His video for Katy Perry "Waking Up in Vegas" won the MVPA 2009 Best Video of the Year.

Kahn's usage of Japanese pop culture in music videos first began with Janet Jackson's "Doesn't Really Matter" video. The video was also the most expensive video Kahn has directed and is among the most expensive of all time, costing over $2.5 million.

In 2014, Kahn was given The Icon Award by the UK Music Video Awards. In 2015, Kahn directed MTV's choices for Video of the Year, Best Pop Video, Best Female Video, and Best Collaboration for multiple videos from Taylor Swift's fifth studio album 1989, including "Blank Space", "Bad Blood", "Wildest Dreams" and "Out of the Woods" and her sixth studio album Reputation, including "Look What You Made Me Do", "...Ready for It?", "End Game" and "Delicate". He won the Grammy Award for Best Music Video of 2015 for Swift's single "Bad Blood" featuring Kendrick Lamar.

In 2017, Kahn won the American Country Music Awards Video of the Year for "Forever Country." In 2019, he collaborated with Ava Max for the "Torn" music video, and directed a new music video for Mariah Carey's 1994 hit, "All I Want for Christmas Is You". In 2022, Kahn directed a music video for Chris Brown's "Iffy".

=== Film ===
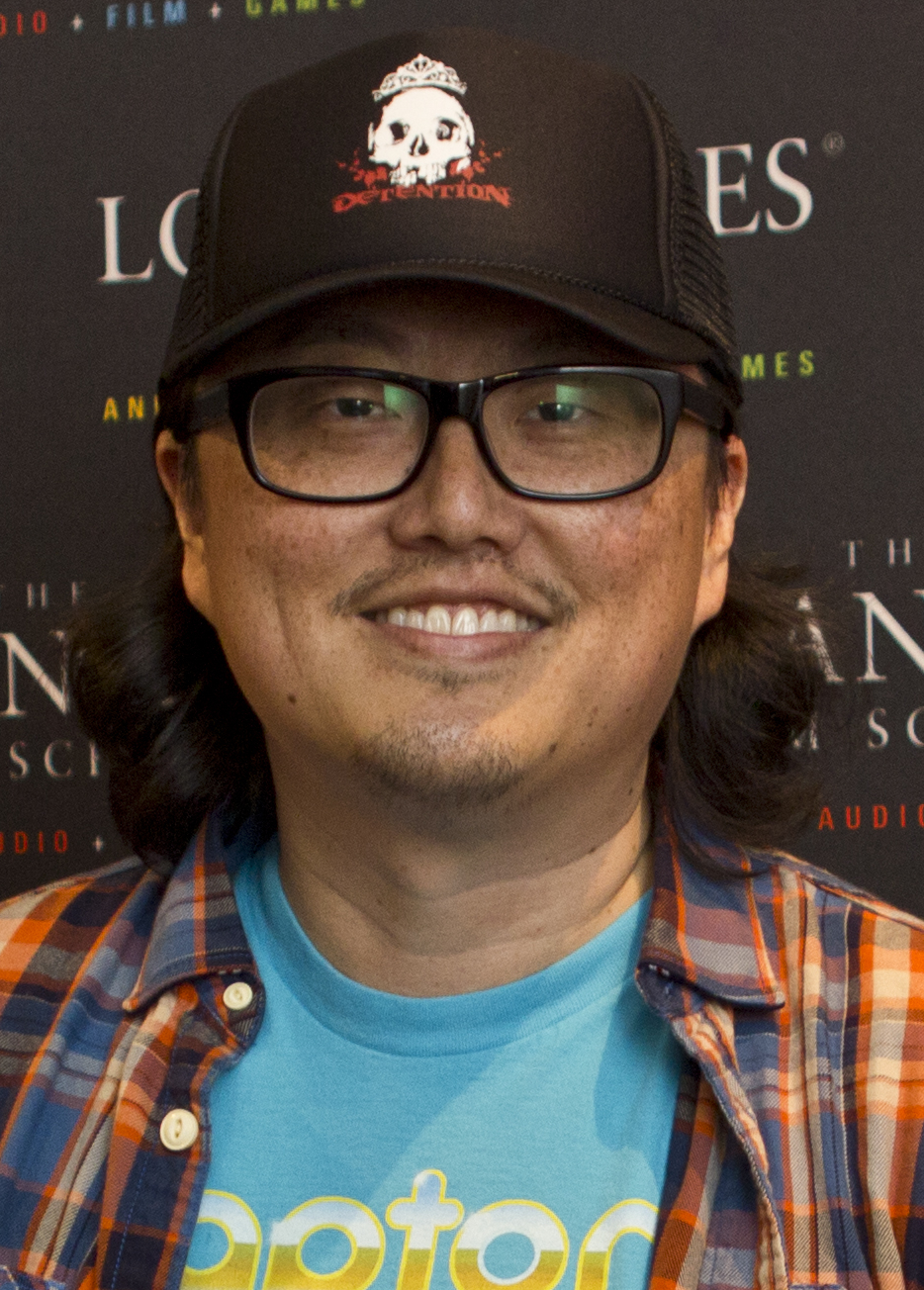
Kahn at a screening of Detention at the Los Angeles Film School, 2012

Kahn make his feature directional debut for the 2004 action film Torque starring Martin Henderson and Ice Cube. In May 2007, it was announced that he would direct an adaptation of William Gibson's science fiction classic Neuromancer for producer Peter Hoffman. On May 7, 2010, Fangoria reported that Vincenzo Natali, the director of Cube and Splice, had taken over directing duties and would also rewrite the screenplay. In 2011, Kahn directed the low-budget self-financed horror comedy Detention. After winning a number of audience favorite awards on the film festival circuit, Detention was picked up for theatrical distribution by Sony for a release in 2012.

In July 2016, test footage for the DC Comics character Swamp Thing was released which was directed by Kahn for the potential Justice League Dark film. Kahn's next film was Bodied, a satirical black comedy about racial tensions in the world of battle rap. The film was produced by Eminem and premiered at the 2017 Toronto International Film Festival, where it won the People's Choice Award in the Midnight Madness section. Bodied continued to pick up the Audience Awards at both AFI Fest and Austin's Fantastic Fest. His fourth feature film, Ick, starring Brandon Routh, Malina Weissman and Mena Suvari, premiered at the 2024 Toronto International Film Festival, and later received a theatrical release in July 2025.

== Awards and nominations ==
Awards and nominations for Joseph Kahn
Year	Organization	Award	Nominated work	Result	Ref.
2002	MTV Video Music Awards	Video of the Year	"Without Me" (by Eminem)	Won	
2002	MTV Video Music Awards	Best Direction	"Without Me" (by Eminem)	Won	
2003	Grammy Awards	Best Music Video	"Without Me" (by Eminem)	Won	
2006	Grammy Awards	Best Music Video	"Feels Just Like It Should" (by Jamiroquai)	Nominated	
2011	Grammy Awards	Best Music Video	"Love the Way You Lie" (by Eminem featuring Rihanna)	Nominated	
2014	UK Music Video Awards	Icon Award	Himself	Won	
2016	Grammy Awards	Best Music Video	"Bad Blood" (by Taylor Swift featuring Kendrick Lamar)	Won	
2017	Academy of Country Music Awards	Video of the Year	"Forever Country" (by Artists of Then, Now & Forever)	Won	
