= Dancing in the Dark (Bruce Springsteen song) =

Single by Bruce Springsteen

from the album Born in the U.S.A.
- B-side: "Pink Cadillac"
- Released: May 9, 1984
- Recorded: February 14, 1984
- Studio: Hit Factory, New York City
- Genre: Dance-rock; synth-rock; pop
- Length: 3:59
- Label: Columbia
- Songwriter: Bruce Springsteen
- Producers: Jon Landau; Chuck Plotkin; Bruce Springsteen; Steven Van Zandt

Bruce Springsteen singles chronology
"Open All Night" (1982)	"Dancing in the Dark" (1984)	"No Surrender" (1984)

Music video
- "Dancing in the Dark" on YouTube

"Dancing in the Dark" is a song written and performed by American rock singer Bruce Springsteen. It was the first single released from his 1984 album, Born in the U.S.A., and became its biggest hit, helping the album become the best-selling of his career.

== Writing and recording ==
Springsteen wrote "Dancing In the Dark" overnight, after Jon Landau convinced him that the album needed a single. According to journalist Dave Marsh in the book Glory Days, Springsteen was not impressed with Landau's approach. "Look", he snarled, "I've written seventy songs. You want another one, you write it." Despite this reaction, Springsteen sat in his hotel room and wrote the song in a single night. It sums up his state of mind, his feeling of isolation after the success of his album The River, and his frustrations of trying to write a hit single. Six takes of "Dancing in the Dark" were recorded on February 14, 1984, at The Hit Factory, and after 58 mixes, work was completed on March 8, 1984. The 12-inch single was released May 9, 1984, and was the highest-selling 12-inch single in the US that year.

== Reception ==
Cash Box said that the song "is classic Springsteen: gutsy vocals set to a hard-driving backbeat" and "an added surprise is the addition of the synthesizer to the inspired playing of the E-Street Band."

== Chart performance ==
Released as a single prior to the album's release, the song entered both the Billboard Hot 100 and the Cash Box Top 100 charts on May 26, 1984, at No. 36 and No. 25 respectively. On June 30, 1984, it began its four week stay at No. 2 on Billboard, behind "The Reflex" by Duran Duran and "When Doves Cry" by Prince, which was 1984's song of the summer. That same week, it reached No. 1 on Cash Box, where it stayed for two weeks. It was also the first of a record-tying seven top 10 hit singles to be released from Born in the U.S.A. "Dancing in the Dark" also held the No. 1 spot for six weeks on Billboard's Top Tracks chart. The song reached No. 1 on the Radio & Records CHR and AOR airplay charts.

"Dancing in the Dark" also had worldwide success. It became Australia's highest-selling single of 1984 (despite peaking at number five on the Kent Music Report), peaking at No. 1 in Belgium and the Netherlands, and charting within the top 10 in seven other countries.

In the UK, the song originally reached No. 28 in 1984, before re-entering the charts in 1985 when it peaked at No. 4. It was the 29th-best-selling single of that year.

The recording also won Springsteen his first Grammy Award, picking up the prize for Best Rock Vocal Performance for 1984. In the 1984 Rolling Stone readers poll, "Dancing in the Dark" was voted "Single of the Year". The track has since gone on to earn further recognition and is as such listed one of The Rock and Roll Hall of Fame's 500 Songs that Shaped Rock and Roll.

In 2024, the song was re-popularized by English football fans during the UEFA Euro 2024 tournament who sang it with adapted lyrics paying tribute to midfielder Phil Foden. As a result, Springsteen's original recording returned to the UK singles chart, reaching No. 36.

== Remixes ==
In a first-for-Springsteen effort to gain dance and club play for his music, Arthur Baker created the 12-inch "Blaster Mix" of "Dancing in the Dark", wherein he reworked the album version. The remix was released on July 2, 1984. The result generated a lot of media buzz for Springsteen, as well as actual club play; the remix went to #7 on the Billboard Hot Dance Music/Club Play chart, and had the most sales of any 12-inch single in the United States in 1984.

== Music video ==
Directed by Brian De Palma, the video was shot at the Saint Paul Civic Center in Saint Paul, Minnesota, on June 28 and 29, 1984. The first night was a pure video shoot, and the second night was on the opening date of the Born in the U.S.A. Tour. Bruce Springsteen and the E Street Band performed the song twice during that show to allow De Palma to get all the footage he needed. The video is a straight performance video, with Springsteen not playing a guitar, allowing him to invite a young woman from the audience, performed by Courteney Cox, to dance along with him on the stage at the end. Although De Palma had told him that it was she whom he was supposed to select, Springsteen thought she was just a pre-selected fan attending and did not know until afterward that she was a professional actress, brought in from New York City, who had already played in As the World Turns. Despite this Cox has stated that she was one of many that Springsteen could have selected and that she was secretly hoping to not be picked.

The video initially included a storyline in which Cox and several of her friends were getting ready to go to the concert with one of them getting picked. Vignettes were shot for this although they remained unused. In September 1985, the video won the MTV Video Music Award for Best Stage Performance and was nominated for Best Overall Performance. Actor Alfonso Ribeiro later claimed to have drawn inspiration from Cox's dancing in the video in developing "The Carlton" for his character in The Fresh Prince of Bel-Air.

== Live performances ==
On the 2009 Working on a Dream Tour, the song appeared intermittently during the encores. However, Springsteen for the first time played a number of music festivals during the routing, and "Dancing in the Dark" closed all of them: Pinkpop Festival, Bonnaroo Music Festival, Glastonbury Festival, and Hard Rock Calling.

During the 2012 Wrecking Ball World Tour the song again became a regular at live shows with audience members selected to dance not just with Springsteen (reenacting the Courteney Cox scene from the video), but with other band members too, especially new band member Jake Clemons. Springsteen family members appeared on stage for this song on occasion, with mother Adele doing the "Courteney Cox" dance at the Wells Fargo Center in Philadelphia at the start of the tour, and daughter Jessica dancing on stage with him in Paris on July 5.

== Personnel ==
According to authors Philippe Margotin and Jean-Michel Guesdon, and the album's liner notes:

- Bruce Springsteen – vocals, guitar
- Roy Bittan – synthesizer
- Clarence Clemons – saxophone
- Garry Tallent – bass
- Max Weinberg – drums

== Track listings ==
=== 7": Columbia / 38-04463 ===
1. "Dancing in the Dark" – 3:59
2. "Pink Cadillac" – 3:33

=== 7": CBS / WA-4463 * ===
1. "Dancing in the Dark" – 3:59
2. "Pink Cadillac" – 3:33

(*Car-shaped picture disc released in the UK, featuring a pink Cadillac on the front side)

=== 12": Columbia / 44-05028 ===
1. "Dancing in the Dark" (Blaster Mix) – 6:09
2. "Dancing in the Dark" (Radio) – 4:50
3. "Dancing in the Dark" (Dub) – 5:30

=== 12": CBS / TA4436 ===
1. "Dancing in the Dark" (Extended Remix) – 6:09
2. "Pink Cadillac" – 3:33
- The B-side of the single, "Pink Cadillac", was a comic rockabilly tale about the virtues (and vices) of a colourful Cadillac; in 1988 it became a #5 hit for Natalie Cole.

== Charts ==
=== Weekly charts ===
Chart (1984–1985)	Peak position
Australia (Kent Music Report)	5
Belgium (Ultratop 50 Flanders)	1
Belgium (VRT Top 30 Flanders)	1
Canada Retail Singles (The Record)	7
Canada Top Singles (RPM)	3
Canada (CHUM)	1
El Salvador (UPI)	6
Europe (Eurochart Hot 100)	35
Finland (Suomen virallinen lista)	11
France (IFOP)	36
Ireland (IRMA)	2
Italy (Musica e dischi)	16
Netherlands (Dutch Top 40)	1
Netherlands (Single Top 100)	2
New Zealand (Recorded Music NZ)	2
Norway (VG-lista)	7
Peru (UPI)	5
Quebec (ADISQ)	7
South Africa (Springbok Radio)	4
Sweden (Sverigetopplistan)	2
UK Singles (Official Charts)	4
US Billboard Hot 100	2
US Mainstream Rock Airplay (Billboard)	1
US Dance/Disco Top 80 (Billboard)	7
US Cash Box Top 100	1
US CHR/Pop Airplay (Radio & Records)	1
Zimbabwe (ZIMA)	3

Chart (2024)	Peak position
UK Singles (Official Charts)	35

Weekly chart performance
Chart (2025)	Peak position
Norway Airplay (IFPI Norge)	47

=== Year-end charts ===
Chart (1984)	Rank
Australia (Kent Music Report)	1
Canada Top Singles (RPM)	20
New Zealand (Recorded Music NZ)	4
US Billboard Hot 100	14
US Cash Box Top 100	3
US CHR/Pop Airplay (Radio & Records)	15

Chart (1985)	Rank
Australia (Kent Music Report)	74
Belgium (Ultratop 50 Flanders)	5
Netherlands (Dutch Top 40)	3
Netherlands (Single Top 100)	9

Chart (2024)	Rank
UK Singles (OCC)	90

== Certifications ==
Region	Certification	Certified units/sales
Australia (ARIA)	9× Platinum	630,000^{‡}
Canada (Music Canada)	Platinum	100,000^{^}
Denmark (IFPI Danmark)	2× Platinum	180,000^{‡}
Germany (BVMI)	Gold	300,000^{‡}
Italy (FIMI)	Platinum	100,000^{‡}
Mexico (AMPROFON)	3× Platinum	180,000^{‡}
New Zealand (RMNZ)	7× Platinum	210,000^{‡}
Portugal (AFP)	Gold	20,000^{‡}
Spain (Promusicae)	Platinum	60,000^{‡}
United Kingdom (BPI)	3× Platinum	1,800,000^{‡}
United States (RIAA)	4× Platinum	4,000,000^{‡}
^{^} Shipments figures based on certification alone.^{‡} Sales+streaming figures based on certification alone.

== See also ==
- List of number-one hits of 1985 (Flanders)
- List of Dutch Top 40 number-one singles of 1985
- List of Billboard Mainstream Rock number-one songs of 1984
- List of Cash Box Top 100 number-one singles of 1984
