= Juke Box Boy =

Single by Baltimora
- B-side: "Pull the Wires"
- Released: 1986
- Genre: Italo disco; synth-pop
- Length: 3:58
- Label: EMI Italiana
- Songwriters: Maurizio Bassi; Naimy Hackett
- Producer: Maurizio Bassi

Baltimora singles chronology
"Living in the Background" (1985)	"Juke Box Boy" (1986)	"Key Key Karimba" (1987)

Music video
- "Juke Box Boy" on YouTube

"Juke Box Boy" is an Italo disco song recorded by the Italian act Baltimora and released as the group's only single in 1986. The song itself did not appear on any original studio album although it was included on the 1986 Canadian edition of the band's first album Living in the Background and on the album's 1993 re-issue as a bonus track. The single had a promotional video created.

Despite the promotional video, the single failed to make much impact worldwide, only peaking at #12 in Italy and #33 in Belgium.

The single was mixed at Paradise Studios in Munich while the US radio version was mixed at Power Station, New York.

== Formats ==
7-inch single

1. "Juke Box Boy" - 3:58
2. "Pull the Wires" - 4:46

12-inch single

1. "Juke Box Boy" - 5:50
2. "Pull the Wires" - 4:46
3. "Juke Box Boy" (U.S.A. Radio Version) - 3:50

== Personnel ==
- Maurizio Bassi – producer, arranger
- Maurizio Cercola – artwork
- Fabio Nosoti – photography

== Charts ==
Chart performance for "Juke Box Boy"
Chart (1986)	Peak position
Belgium (Ultratop 50 Flanders)	33
Italy (Musica e dischi)	16
