= Nine Lives (2016 film) =

2016 film by Barry Sonnenfeld

- Theatrical release poster
- Directed by: Barry Sonnenfeld
- Written by: Gwyn Lurie; Matt R. Allen; Caleb Wilson; Daniel Antoniazzi; Ben Shiffrin
- Produced by: Lisa Ellzey
- Starring: Kevin Spacey; Jennifer Garner; Robbie Amell; Cheryl Hines; Malina Weissman; Christopher Walken
- Cinematography: Karl Walter Lindenlaub
- Edited by: Don Zimmerman; David Zimmerman
- Music by: Evgueni Galperine; Sacha Galperine
- Production company: Fundamental Films
- Distributed by: EuropaCorp
- Release dates: 31 July 2016 (Los Angeles); 3 August 2016 (France); 5 August 2016 (United States); 9 September 2016 (Canada)
- Running time: 87 minutes
- Countries: United States; France; Canada
- Language: English
- Budget: $30 million
- Box office: $57.8 million

Nine Lives is a 2016 fantasy comedy film directed by Barry Sonnenfeld, written by Gwyn Lurie, Matt R. Allen, Caleb Wilson, Dan Antoniazzi and Ben Shiffrin, and starring Kevin Spacey, Jennifer Garner, Robbie Amell, Cheryl Hines, Malina Weissman and Christopher Walken. It is an international co-production between the United States, France and Canada. The plot follows a workaholic father who has his mind trapped inside his daughter's new cat.

The film was released by EuropaCorp on 5 August 2016 and grossed $57 million. The film was panned by critics, who called it unoriginal and unfunny.

== Plot ==
Tom Brand is a successful tycoon in NYC whose workaholic attitude ruined his first marriage. His adult son David works for him, striving for his approval. They live with Tom's second wife Lara, who is a little more tolerant of Tom's frequent absences, and the couple's daughter Rebecca. Tom's company FireBrand is nearing completion of its greatest achievement, the tallest skyscraper in the northern hemisphere. The film opens with Tom skydiving onto the roof of the new skyscraper. David remained in the plane, refusing to jump.

Rebecca wants a cat for her 11th birthday, something cat-hating Tom has always refused. During his last-minute gift shopping Tom's GPS directs him to a mysterious pet store called Purrkins Pet Shop, brimming with odd and exotic cats. The store's eccentric owner, Felix, tells him he doesn't pick the cat, the cat picks him and a tomcat called Mr. Fuzzypants who has used up seven of his nine lives leaves with Tom. They stop at the office on the way home, and Tom argues with Ian Cox, his building manager, on the roof of the skyscraper. Tom learns a structure in Chicago will be taller and fires Ian. Lightning strikes the antenna moments later, blowing Tom off the building with the cat. His leg snags and flings him through a window. He wakes up to find his human body is in the hospital in a coma, and his consciousness is trapped inside the cat's body.

Tom is visited by Felix, who is able to talk to him. Aware of what happened, Felix warns Tom to reevaluate his priorities, connect with his family, and avoid past mistakes within one week or else remain a cat forever. When Lara and Rebecca take Mr. Fuzzypants home, he acts stubbornly to convince his wife and daughter he is actually Tom. This drives them mad and he slowly comes to see how much he had ignored his family. Tom's suspicions of Lara cheating on him with an erstwhile model named Josh prove true, and Tom also learns Josh is a realtor looking for a house for Lara as a prelude to divorce. Tom is motivated to try to make Lara happy. He also learns Ian and the board of directors want to take power from Tom via a public offering. When David tries to stop him, Ian fires David and plans to announce the public offering at the tower's grand opening.

Rebecca realizes Mr. Fuzzypants is really her father and Tom's body deteriorates in the hospital. Lara, David, and Rebecca visit with the cat hidden in her backpack. While alone, David apologizes to Tom for failing to save the company and takes Tom's ID badge, implying he will commit suicide. Lara and Dr. Cole arrange a Do not resuscitate order. Rebecca asks the cat to prove he is really Tom. Remembering Felix's statement that love is about sacrifice, Tom decides to save David instead, sacrificing his chance to regain his humanity.

David jumps off the building and the cat jumps after him pulling a cable. However, David, wearing a BASE jumping parachute, lands in the middle of the grand opening party, presents the company's articles of incorporation, and announces he now controls his father's majority share of the stock. He announces the company will remain a family company. Tom wakes up from his coma and sees David's announcement on the television. Ian, just fired by David, walks past Felix who tells him to hang up his cell phone. He ignores him and is hit by a car. His consciousness transfers into a cat that Felix takes back to his shop.

Tom and Rebecca return to Felix to ask if he has any dogs. Felix presents them with Mr. Fuzzypants, who has one life left.

== Cast ==
- Kevin Spacey as Tom Brand, a tycoon and owner of FireBrand who ends up in the body of a cat named Mr. Fuzzypants. Spacey also voices himself when in Mr. Fuzzypants' body
- Jennifer Garner as Lara Brand, Tom's second wife, Rebecca's mother, and David's stepmother.
- Robbie Amell as David Brand, the son of Tom and Madison, the older half-brother of Rebecca and Nicole, (although he spends more time with Rebecca) and the stepson of Lara who works at FireBrand.
- Cheryl Hines as Madison Camden, the former wife of Tom and the mother of David and Nicole.
- Mark Consuelos as Ian Cox, the top manager at FireBrand who schemes to take control of the company. Ian also voices himself in a cat's body.
- Malina Weissman as Rebecca Brand, the daughter of Tom and Lara and the paternal half-sister of David.
- Christopher Walken as Felix Perkins, the magician and owner of an exotic pet store.
- Teddy Sears as Josh Myers, a realtor that Lara sees
- Jay Patterson as Benson
- Talitha Bateman as Nicole Camden, the daughter of Madison and the maternal half-sister of David Brand.
- Jewelle Blackman as Doctor Cole
- Serge Houde as Stein, a board member
- Mark Camacho as Josh Boone

=== Voices ===
- Jon Olson as Mr. Fuzzypants vocal effects
- Barry Sonnenfeld as cat vocal effects
- Chloe Sonnenfeld as cat vocal effects

=== Animal cast ===
- Lil Bub
- Nala
- Pudge
- Waffles

== Production ==
On 12 January 2015, it was announced Barry Sonnenfeld would direct the film. On 28 January 2015, Kevin Spacey joined the cast. On 25 March 2015, Malina Weissman joined the cast. On 31 March 2015, Christopher Walken joined the cast to play Felix Perkins, the owner of a mystical pet shop, and on 9 April 2015, Jennifer Garner and Robbie Amell joined as well. On 13 April 2015, Mark Consuelos was cast in the film, and on 27 April 2015, Talitha Bateman was cast as well. Principal photography began on 4 May 2015, and ended on 24 July 2015. Filming took place in Montreal.

== Release ==
The film was originally scheduled to be released on 29 April 2016, by EuropaCorp, but was pushed back to 5 August 2016.

The film was released on DVD and Blu-ray on 1 November 2016, by 20th Century Fox Home Entertainment in the United States. It was released on DVD and Blu-ray in Australia on 7 December 2016, by Madman Entertainment under the alternate title Mr. Fuzzypants.

== Reception ==
=== Box office ===
Nine Lives grossed $19.7 million in North America and $38.1 million in other territories for a worldwide total of $57.8 million against a budget of $30 million.

The film was released in North America on 5 August 2016 alongside Suicide Squad. The film was projected to gross $10 million from 2,264 theaters in its opening weekend. The film made $2.4 million on its first day. It went on to gross $6.2 million in its opening weekend, finishing 6th at the box office.

=== Critical response ===
On the review aggregator website Rotten Tomatoes, 14% of 71 critics' reviews are positive, with an average rating of 3.2/10. The website's consensus reads: "Not meow, not ever." Metacritic, which uses a weighted average, assigned the film a score of 11 out of 100, based on 16 critics, indicating "overwhelming dislike". Audiences polled by CinemaScore gave the film an average grade of "B+" on an A+ to F scale.

IndieWire's David Ehrlich gave the film a grade of D, saying the film was "less funny than the average cat gif and approximately 1,000 times as long... Cats may have nine lives, but you only get one, and it's too precious to waste on this drivel. You're better off watching a gif of a cat whose face is stuck in a slice of bread. It will save you $20 and a few hours of your time". Wendy Ide of The Observer gave it two out of five stars, writing, "Like a bargain-basement version of Freaky Friday crossed with a cat meme, the comedy here is inert, despite the efforts of a psychotically chipper musical score." Rolling Stone's Peter Travers gave the film zero out of four stars and wrote, "At 87 torturous, laugh-free minutes, the film could change the most avid cat fancier into a kitty hater".

Kevin Spacey later poked fun of the film and its poor reception during a 2026 appearance on Club Random with Bill Maher in which he reflected on his Hollywood career and the sexual assault allegations he faced. Sitting down with Bill Maher at the start of the interview, he said, "And every now and then, you make a Nine Lives. What can you do? I turned into a cat." Maher, unfamiliar with the film, asked, "What was that? Was it a bad movie you were in?" When Maher asked where that fell in his career, Spacey admitted, "It was at a point where I was willing to make a movie just for money. Because I was very bankable."
