= Woody Boogie =

Single by Baltimora

from the album Living in the Background
- B-side: "Woody Boogie (Instrumental)"
- Released: October 1985
- Recorded: Il Cortile studio, Milan.
- Genre: Italo disco; synth-pop
- Length: 3:46
- Label: EMI Italiana
- Songwriters: Maurizio Bassi; Naimy Hackett
- Producer: Maurizio Bassi

Baltimora singles chronology
"Tarzan Boy" (1985)	"Woody Boogie" (1985)	"Living in the Background" (1985)

Music video
- "Woody Boogie" on YouTube

"Woody Boogie" is an Italo disco song recorded and released by Italy-based act Baltimora. Released in 1985, it was the group's second single from their debut album Living in the Background, where it appears as the fourth track. Two promotional videos were created for the single. The song notably features a synthesizer replaying cartoon character Woody Woodpecker’s signature laugh, which is incorporated into the chorus as well as other parts of the song.

Despite the promotion, the single failed to make any impact in the United Kingdom or United States unlike the previous hit single "Tarzan Boy". However, the single was a fair hit within Europe.

== Music video ==
The music video features Jimmy McShane arriving to a record factory pushing a bike, changing into the factory uniform, and heading towards a group of workers. As he begins to place "Woody Boogie" records in a box, McShane is scolded by one of his superiors, who is accompanied by his assistant (played by Baltimora's lyricist, Naimy Hackett). McShane becomes angry, and he begins to dance. At this point the song's chorus begins to play. McShane and the rest of the workers (one of which is played by Baltimora vocalist/producer Maurizio Bassi) head into what appears to be a storage room and begin to dance until the end of the video, where McShane kisses Hackett, and the screen freezes and slowly fades to black.

== Formats ==
7-inch single

1. "Woody Boogie" - 3:46
2. "Woody Boogie" (Instrumental) - 3:51

7-inch single (UK)

1. "Woody Boogie" - 3:37
2. "Woody Boogie" (Jumpin' Mix) - 3:46

12-inch single

1. "Woody Boogie" (Jumping Mix) - 5:50
2. "Woody Boogie" (Instrumental) - 4:35

12-inch single (UK)

1. "Woody Boogie" (Unknown Mix) - 5:52
2. "Woody Boogie" (Instrumental) - 4:36
3. "Woody Boogie" (7" Version) - 3:37

== Personnel ==
- Maurizio Bassi – producer, arranger
- Jurgen Koppers – mixing
- Paolo Mescoli – recording

== Charts ==
Chart performance for "Woody Boogie"
Chart (1985)	Peak position
Belgium (Ultratop 50 Flanders)	11
Europe (European Top 100 Singles)	39
Finland (Suomen virallinen lista)	4
Ireland (IRMA)	30
Netherlands (Dutch Top 40 Tipparade)	16
Netherlands (Single Top 100)	32
Spain (AFYVE)	7
Sweden (Sverigetopplistan)	4
Switzerland (Schweizer Hitparade)	15
West Germany (GfK)	20

== See also ==
- "Woodpeckers from Space"
