= What Doth Life =

- Founded: 2010
- Founder: Brendan Dangelo, Kiel Alarcon, Tim Knapp
- Genre: Alternative rock, indie rock, indie pop, punk rock
- Country of origin: United States
- Location: Windsor, Vermont
- Official website: whatdothlife.com

What Doth Life is a music collective founded in 2010 and based in Windsor, Vermont. They organize shows and festivals, release albums under their record label, and direct music videos. Notable artists include The Pilgrims, Carton, Giant Travel Avant Garde, Luke Chrisinger, and Derek and the Demons. The label is run by the musicians it represents and is described as a "musician's co-op".
