= Ick (film) =

2024 film by Joseph Kahn

- Premiere poster
- Directed by: Joseph Kahn
- Written by: Joseph Kahn; Dan Koontz; Samuel Laskey
- Produced by: Joe Heath; David Kang; Steven Schneider; Adi Shankar
- Starring: Brandon Routh; Malina Weissman; Taia Sophia; Zeke Jones; Jack Seavor McDonald; Harrison Cone; Jeff Fahey; Mena Suvari
- Cinematography: David C. Weldon Jr.
- Edited by: Chancler Haynes
- Music by: Brain Mantia; Melissa Reese
- Production companies: Room 101, Inc.; Image Nation; Interstellar Entertainment; AGC Studios
- Distributed by: Fathom Entertainment
- Release dates: September 7, 2024 (TIFF); July 24, 2025 (United States)
- Running time: 93 minutes
- Countries: United Arab Emirates; United States
- Language: English

Ick is a 2024 science fiction horror comedy film directed by Joseph Kahn and starring Brandon Routh, Malina Weissman, Taia Sophia, Zeke Jones, Jack Seavor McDonald, Harrison Cone, Jeff Fahey, and Mena Suvari. The film follows former high school football star turned science teacher Hank Wallace (Routh), who teams up with his student Grace (Weissman) and former girlfriend Staci (Suvari) to fight an alien threat in their town.

Ick premiered at the Toronto International Film Festival on September 7, 2024. The film received generally positive reviews from critics.

== Plot ==
Sometime during the 2000s, the career aspirations of talented high school football quarterback Hank Wallace are dashed when his leg is broken during a game by the "Ick", a parasitic, plant-like substance that appears to be mostly benign despite gradually growing throughout Hank's hometown of Eastbrook. Hank's life worsens as his girlfriend Staci leaves him for their classmate Ted Kim.

Years later, Hank, having never left Eastbrook, works as a science teacher at Eastbrook High while Ted and Staci have married and Ted runs a successful realty business. The Ick, meanwhile, is implied to have spread indefinitely across the country, although no one has dealt with it due to its seemingly harmless nature. While purchasing a run-down bar from Ted and Staci, Hank accidentally discovers that their daughter Grace, who is also one of his students, may in fact be his daughter with Staci. He subsequently plans to conduct a paternity test using a sample of Grace's saliva she had provided him for a class assignment.

One night, Hank is attacked by the rapidly growing Ick, though he is saved by his UV light therapy mask, which prevents the Ick from growing. Hank's subsequent research leads him to conclude that the Ick, due to its plant-like nature, only grows in the dark while engaging in photosynthesis in the presence of UV light, instantly causing it to become stagnant. Hank is soon attacked in the bar by a customer whose entire body has been infected with the Ick, although he manages to escape.

Hank goes to a house party attended by Grace and many of her classmates to warn them of the threat, but they ignore his warnings. Soon after, the Ick invades the party and begins infecting and killing many students, though it is soon subdued by the arrival of a military unit. At a town meeting later that night, the unit's leader warns the town's residents to stay indoors until the Ick has subsided, before announcing that the unit has been assigned to prioritize a neighboring town, leaving the Eastbrook residents to their own devices.

Most of the town's residents ignore the military's warnings, instead continuing to go about their normal routines, with many more becoming infected agents of the Ick in the process. Following an argument with her boyfriend Dylan, Grace is offered a ride home by Hank. The two are attacked by the Ick, which overturns their car. While waiting for Grace's cousin to arrive with a tow truck, Grace, to her horror, discovers the envelope containing her saliva sample that Hank was going to send off to a paternity test. She denounces him for having never been in her life beforehand and states that she will never view him as a father.

The town prepares for Eastbrook High's prom the following night. Before the prom, Hank meets with Staci and asks her about the possibility of Grace being his daughter. As Staci considers the likelihood, she is pulled underground and killed by the Ick. As the prom begins, Hank attempts to warn the students of the Ick, but he is too late, with the Ick consuming many of the students and faculty, including the chaperoning Ted. Hank rescues Grace from an infected Dylan and they, along with Grace's surviving friends Heather and Griffin, manage to escape the school.

Hank, Grace, Heather, and Griffin use the school's football stadium lights to temporarily stop the Ick, which has now grown into a giant, tentacled monster, although it soon sinks underground and destabilizes the ground underneath the lights, disabling them. With sunrise on the way, the remaining survivors resolve to climb up a nearby radio tower to escape the Ick. Most of the remaining promgoers are killed by the Ick while trying to climb the tower, leaving only Hank, Grace, Heather, and Griffin, who reach the top and watch as the sunlight sends the Ick into stasis.

Sometime later, Eastbrook's remaining residents have set up numerous UV lights around town to ward off the Ick at night while daily life has once again resumed as normal. Grace has accepted Hank as a father figure and reveals that she sent in her saliva sample for the test. Upon receiving the results in the mail, they react with uneasiness at the results as the film ends.

== Cast ==
- Brandon Routh as Hank Wallace
- Malina Weissman as Grace Kim
- Taia Sophia as Heather
- Zeke Jones as Griffin
- Jack Seavor McDonald as Tristan
- Harrison Cone as Dylan
- Debra Wilson as Dr. Prentice
- Jeff Fahey as Andy Wallace
- Mena Suvari as Staci Kim

== Production ==
In an interview with Variety, director Joseph Kahn cited the Steven Spielberg monster films Jaws (1975) and Jurassic Park (1993) as inspiration for Ick, stating, "The horror in our film is not funny. It’s taken very seriously. And the thing I would say about Spielberg is that when he does horror, when you watch Jaws, it’s actually a very funny movie. Richard Dreyfuss is really funny in that movie and there are a lot of funny sight gags and interpersonal relationships."

== Release ==
Ick premiered at the Toronto International Film Festival on September 7, 2024.

Ick was released in a one-week limited theatrical release in the United States on July 24, 2025, in New York City and Los Angeles, along with a special three-day nationwide screening event from July 27 to July 29, 2025.

== Reception ==
On the review aggregator website Rotten Tomatoes, 68% of 34 critics' reviews are positive. The website's consensus reads: "Slightly stuck in genre convention, but mostly an Ick-fest of horrific fun that oozes solid B-film trappings." Metacritic, which uses a weighted average, assigned the film a score of 67 out of 100, based on 8 critics, indicating "generally favorable" reviews.

Stephen Saito of Variety gave the film a positive review, praising Routh's performance and Kahn's direction.
