= Dee D. Jackson =

British singer

- Also known as: Dee D. Jackson
- Born: Deirdre Elaine Cozier; 15 July 1954 (age 72); Oxford, England
- Genres: Pop, space disco, Italo disco
- Occupation: Singer-songwriter
- Instrument: Vocals
- Years active: 1977–present
- Labels: Jupiter (Germany), Carrere (France), Deram, London and Durium (UK), DME (Italy), AVI and UAR (USA), CAR (USA, Canada)
- Website: www.deedjackson.com

Dee D. Jackson (born Deirdre Elaine Cozier, 15 July 1954, Oxford, England) is an English singer and musician who was primarily associated with the space disco genre. In the 1970s, she worked as a film producer in Munich before moving into music, working with Giorgio Moroder, Jimmy McShane and Keith Forsey. Jackson is perhaps best known for "Automatic Lover" (1978), the lead single from her concept album Cosmic Curves (1978).

== Career ==
Deirdre Elaine Cozier was born on 15 July 1954 in Oxford, England, and lived there with her father Roy (a pianist), her mother Gloria (a former chorus girl, dancer and singer) and five younger siblings until her early 20s. Her passion for music was kindled in her youth thanks to "a fabulous music teacher who thought [she] was worth investing his time on". Cozier took classical dance lessons and learned from an early age to play the violin and piano; she noted that "music lived in [her] house" as a child. When she was nineteen, she was married for a period of three weeks "to a minstrel" who "absconded with all of their belongings after only three weeks". After she "began [her] search for him", Cozier left the United Kingdom for Germany with only the clothes on her back and the little money in her pocket; she never saw the man again.

With little to fall back on, Cozier earned her scarce income by performing gigs all over Germany, noting that her "very first gig was in a strip club singing three songs a night with a Turkish jazz quartet". After she found a manager and producer, she spent several months performing whenever and wherever she could in Munich; she was soon introduced to the likes of Giorgio Moroder, Keith Forsey, Zeke Lund and Harold Faltermeyer; Cozier soon began performing under the stage name Dee D. Jackson upon the suggestion of her producer Gary Unwin and his wife Patty. The alias was coined "because no one ever got [her real] name right".

Simultaneously performing live and working for other artists as a backing vocalist, Jackson's first single, "Man of a Man" (1977), was released to sales of only a few thousand copies and did not garner the public's attention. It was at this time that she began work on the space disco concept album Cosmic Curves (1978) in the recording studio; the launch of the album was preceded by the release of its lead single, "Automatic Lover" (1977), which became her greatest critical and commercial success and sold an estimated six to eight million copies across Europe, including peaking at No. 4 on the UK Singles Chart and No. 5 in Germany. In Brazil, the success was such that the Brazilian media produced its own version of Dee D. Jackson, an impostor performer introduced as "D. Dee Jackson" (played by Regina Shakti) performed to the real Jackson's song during the height of her commercial success. Jackson was upset to discover, upon the song's release, that she was not credited for writing the chorus (Gary and Patty Unwin took full credit for her contributions, and as such she did not receive songwriting royalties for the single for years.

Jackson's subsequent singles - "Meteor Man", "Which Way Is Up", "Fireball", "S.O.S. (Love to the Rescue)" and "Thunder and Lightning" - received modest airplay but failed to attract the commercial attention of her biggest hit, just as did the sales of her second studio album, Thunder & Lightning (1980), were less remarkable in comparison to Cosmic Curves. After months of exhaustively traveling in promotion of her work, including television appearances across much of Europe, Jackson briefly moved to Los Angeles for several months before relocating to Italy, where an additional string of Italo disco and space disco singles were released to limited success. She established a recording studio in Rome and spent much of the remainder of her career as a production and writing assistant for other artists. A third album, Blame It on the Rain (1992), was completed but withdrawn from the market due to disagreements with the distributor. She continues to write and produce songs for other musicians (ex. Nylon Moon), and resides in Turin with her son Norman.

Of her entire discography, Jackson's favourite release is the space disco single "Moonlight Starlight".

== Discography ==
=== Albums ===
- Cosmic Curves (1978) - AUS #79
- Thunder & Lightning (1980) [Released in Italy as The Fantastic]
- Blame It on the Rain (1992)

=== Compilation albums and boxed sets ===
- Profile (1981)
- Il Meglio (1998)
- Discomania (2002)
- Space and Time 2010 (2010)
- Starlight – The Ultimate Collection (2012)
- Her Story (2015)

=== Singles ===
| Year | Title | Peak chart positions | | |
| Year | Title | AUS | IT | UK |
|---|---|---|---|---|
| 1977 | "Man of a Man" | — | — | — |
| 1978 | "Automatic Lover" | 56 | 13 | 4 |
| 1978 | "Meteor Man" | — | 1 | 48 |
| 1979 | "Which Way Is Up" | — | 80 | — |
| 1979 | "Fireball" | — | 22 | — |
| 1980 | "S.O.S. (Love to the Rescue)" | — | 26 | — |
| 1980 | "Thunder and Lightning" | — | 64 | — |
| 1981 | "Talk Me Down" | — | — | — |
| 1982 | "Shotgun" / "How Do You Want Your Love" | — | — | — |
| 1984 | "Moonlight Starlight" | — | 268 | — |
| 1984 | "My Sweet Carillon" | — | — | — |
| 1984 | "Sky Walking" | — | — | — |
| 1985 | "Heat of the Night" | — | — | — |
| 1996 | "People" | — | — | — |
"—" denotes releases that did not chart or were not released.
