= Automatic Lover =

Single by Dee D. Jackson

from the album Cosmic Curves
- Released: 1978
- Genre: Disco
- Length: 3:55
- Label: Jupiter Records; Mercury Records
- Songwriters: Gary Unwin; Patty Unwin
- Producer: Gary Unwin

Dee D. Jackson singles chronology
"Man of a Man" (1977)	"Automatic Lover" (1978)	"Meteor Man" (1978)

Music video
- "Automatic Lover" on YouTube

"Automatic Lover" is a 1978 song by English singer and musician Dee D. Jackson, released as the lead single from her debut album, Cosmic Curves (1978). The song was very successful on the charts in Europe, reaching number two in Sweden, number three in Ireland, number four in the UK and number five in both Norway and West Germany. It also charted in Australia and climbed high up the South African singles charts. In Brazil, the success was such that the Brazilian media produced its own version of Dee D. Jackson. The accompanying music video for the song features Jackson performing with a robot. The refrain, "See me, feel me, hear me, love me, touch me", was sampled on the Friends of Matthew track, "Out There" in 1991, released on Pulse 8 Records. A trance remix of "Out There" by Lange was released on Serious Records in 1999 to moderate success, in the UK.

The song's "robotic" backing vocals were provided by Jimmy McShane, who subsequently toured Europe with Jackson and her band as a stage dancer and backing singer.

== Track listing ==
- 7", UK (1978)

A. "Automatic Lover"
B. "Didn't Think You'd Do It"

== Charts ==
Chart (1978)	Peak position
Australia (Kent Music Report)	56
Austria (Ö3 Austria Top 40)	11
Brazil (Billboard)	1
Denmark (Hitlisten)	5
Finland (Suomen virallinen lista)	10
France (IFOP)	70
Iceland (Morgunblaðið)	1
Ireland (IRMA)	3
Italy (Musica e dischi)	6
Norway (VG-lista)	5
South Africa (Springbok Radio)	15
Spain (PROMUSICAE)	7
Sweden (Sverigetopplistan)	2
Switzerland (Schweizer Hitparade)	6
UK Singles (OCC)	4
West Germany (Official German Charts)	5
