= Living in the Background (album) =

1985 studio album by Baltimora

- US and Canadian cover

Studio album by Baltimora
- Released: April 1985
- Genres: Italo disco; new wave
- Length: 34:01
- Label: EMI
- Producer: Maurizio Bassi

Baltimora chronology
Living in the Background (1985)	Survivor in Love (1987)

Singles from Living in the Background
- 1. "Tarzan Boy" Released: April 1985; 2. "Woody Boogie" Released: 1985; 3. "Living in the Background" Released: 1985; 4. "Juke Box Boy" Released: 1986

Italian and German cover

UK cover

Professional ratings
Review scores
Source	Rating
Music Week	3/3 stars

Living in the Background is the debut studio album by Italian-based act Baltimora, released in the United States in April 1985 by EMI-Manhattan Records and in Europe on 4 September 1985 by EMI.

== Overview ==
Jimmy McShane supposedly performed the lead vocals, although there is some controversy surrounding who the actual singer is, while the songs were written by Maurizio Bassi and Naimy Hackett. "Tarzan Boy", the first single released from the album, became an international success, peaking at number 13 on the US Billboard Hot 100 and at number three in the United Kingdom. "Woody Boogie" and "Living in the Background" were also released as singles, with the latter becoming the group's only other song to crack the Billboard Hot 100, peaking at number 87 on the chart.

The album has been released with at least three different covers. The US and Canadian cover features Jimmy McShane jumping in the air on a red background with black text. The text is an extract from a prose poem by French poet Stéphane Mallarmé, "Le Phénomène Futur" (The Future Phenomenon).

The album has also been released and re-released in various forms, though none of these different versions of the album seem to correlate with any particular one of the various album covers. A bonus track from one of these later pressings of the album, "Juke Box Boy" was also released as a single.

The original CD issue of Living in the Background, from 2003, is out-of-print. An Italian CD release was issued in 2005, and that same year an unofficial Russian release circulated too.

== Critical reception ==
Italian writer Rocco Bargioni gives the album a positive review: "with a hit like Tarzan Boy, Baltimora could easily have gotten away with an album full of fillers and pointless tracks—it would have made the charts anyway. Instead, Living In The Background is a rather interesting collection (and aptly titled: it wasn’t actually Baltimora’s frontman singing, but the musicians behind the scenes)". In his review of the track Running For Your Love, he says, “It’s the fastest and most upbeat track on the album. A good example of Italo disco on an album that was a huge hit in countries where people don’t always know what Italo disco is.”

== Track listing ==
All tracks are written by Naimy Hackett and Maurizio Bassi.

No.	Title	Length
1.	"Tarzan Boy"	6:15
2.	"Pull the Wires"	4:46
3.	"Living in the Background"	6:06
4.	"Woody Boogie"	5:50
5.	"Chinese Restaurant"	5:14
6.	"Running for Your Love"	5:50
Total length:		34:01

UK edition
No.	Title	Length
1.	"Tarzan Boy" (12″ Summer version)	6:41
2.	"Pull the Wires"	4:46
3.	"Living in the Background"	6:06
4.	"Tarzan Boy" (7″ Summer version)	3:27
5.	"Woody Boogie" (12″ Jump mix)	5:50
6.	"Chinese Restaurant"	5:14
7.	"Running for Your Love"	5:50
8.	"Woody Boogie"	3:37

Canadian edition (1986)
No.	Title	Length
1.	"Tarzan Boy" (Single version)
2.	"Living in the Background" (Remix by John Luongo)
3.	"Juke Box Boy"
4.	"Pull the Wires"
5.	"Woody Boogie"
6.	"Chinese Restaurant"
7.	"Running for Your Love"
8.	"Up with Baltimora"

1993 re-release bonus tracks
No.	Title	Length
7.	"Tarzan Boy" (Summer version)	6:40
8.	"Juke Box Boy"	3:42
9.	"Up with Baltimora"	2:51
10.	"Tarzan Boy" (Remix 1993)	3:43
11.	"Jungle Life" (Dub)	5:00
12.	"Tarzan Boy" (Extended mix)	5:29

== Personnel ==
=== Musicians ===
- Maurizio Bassi – keyboards, piano, lead vocals
- Leandro Gaetano – keyboards, Fairlight CMI programming, PPG Wave 2.3, Xpander, Yamaha synthesizer
- Claudio Bazzari, Giorgio Cocilovo – electric guitars
- Claudio Pascoli – saxophone
- Pier Michelatti – bass
- Gabriele Melotti – drums, Linn drum programming, Simmons EDS 7
- Moreno Ferrara, Malcom Charlton, Silvano Fossati, Naimy Hackett, Lella Esposito, Jimmy McShane, Silver Pozzoli – backing vocals

=== Technical ===
- Maurizio Bassi – producer, arrangement
- Jurgen Koppers – mixing
- Paolo Mescoli – recording

=== Artwork ===
- Michele Bernardi – cover illustration
- Martin Beckett – photography (UK edition)

== Charts ==
Chart performance for Living in the Background
Chart (1985–1986)	Peak position
Canada Top Albums/CDs (RPM)	49
Finnish Albums (Suomen virallinen lista)	10
Swedish Albums (Sverigetopplistan)	18
US Billboard 200	49

== Certifications ==
Certifications for Living in the Background
Region	Certification	Certified units/sales
Canada (Music Canada)	Gold	50,000^{^}
^{^} Shipments figures based on certification alone.
