= Malina Weissman =

American actress (born 2003)

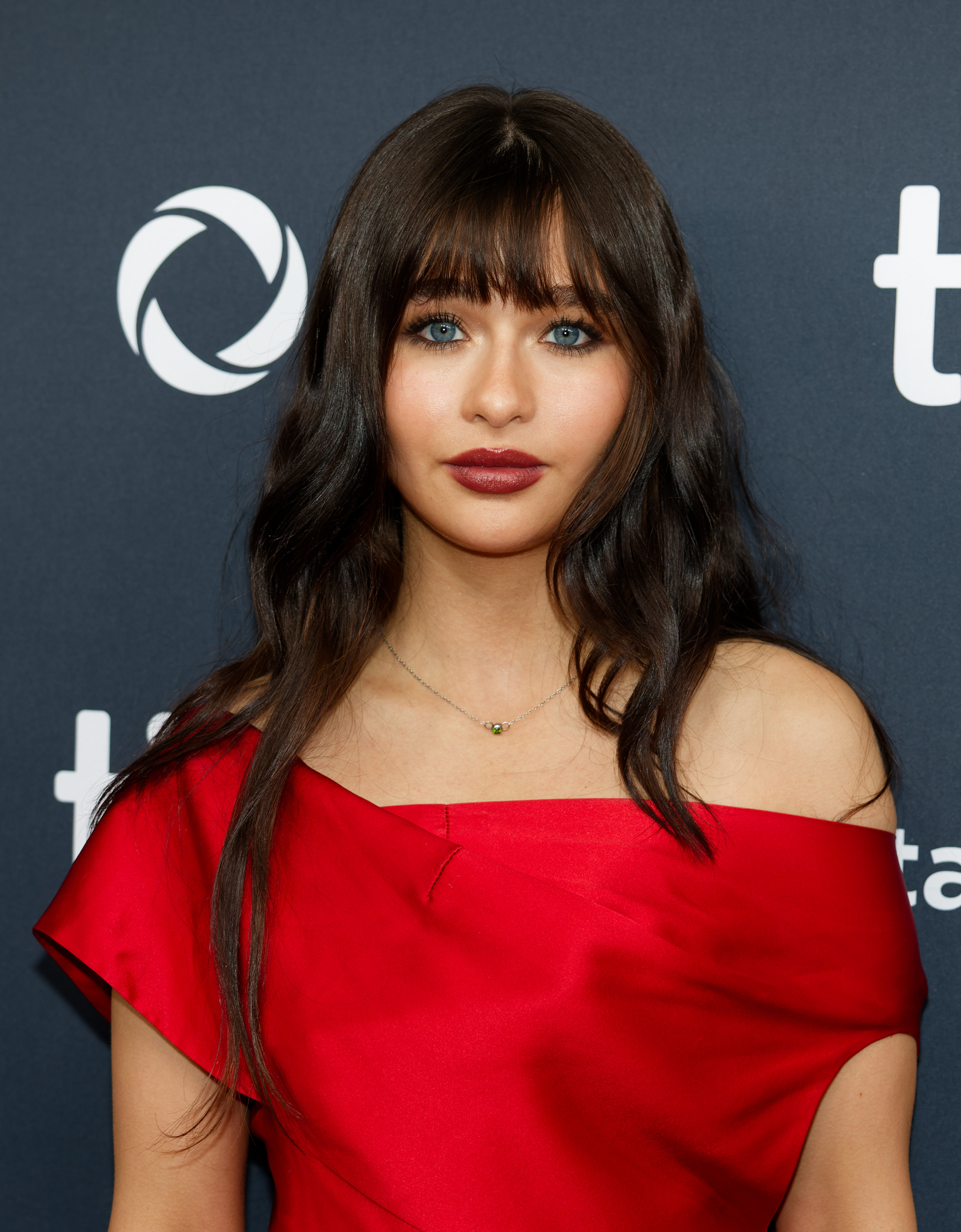
- Weissman at the 2024 Toronto International Film Festival
- Born: March 12, 2003 (age 23); New York City, U.S.
- Occupations: Actress; model
- Years active: 2013–present
- Known for: A Series of Unfortunate Events; Coven Academy

Malina Weissman (born March 12, 2003) is an American actress and model, known for playing the roles of Rebecca Brand in Nine Lives, Violet Baudelaire in A Series of Unfortunate Events, young Kara Zor-El in Supergirl, and Briar Roberts in Coven Academy.

== Early life ==
Weissman was born on March 12, 2003 in New York City, and continues to live there. She started her career as a model at the age of eight. Her mother is from East Germany.She speaks fluent English, German and Spanish. Her older sister is Ayla D'Lyla, an indie pop artist. Malina Weissman graduated from New York University in May 2025.

== Career ==
A New York City-based model and actress, Weissman has modeled for major designers and brands like Calvin Klein, Ralph Lauren, Levi's, Benetton, DKNY, and H&M. As an actress, she has appeared in commercials for ACT mouthwash, Maybelline, Purell, and My Little Pony.

She made her film debut playing the role of a young April O'Neil in the science fiction action comedy film Teenage Mutant Ninja Turtles, the role played as an adult by Megan Fox, in 2014. In 2015, Weissman appeared in CBS and Warner Bros. Television's superhero series Supergirl as a young Kara Zor-El, played as an adult by Melissa Benoist.

In 2016, Weissman appeared in the film Thirsty, and had the significant role of Rebecca Brand in the comedy film Nine Lives, also starring Kevin Spacey and Jennifer Garner, which was released in August 2016. From 2017 until 2019, Weissman starred as Violet Baudelaire in the Netflix series A Series of Unfortunate Events, alongside Neil Patrick Harris, Patrick Warburton, K. Todd Freeman and Louis Hynes.

== Filmography ==
=== Film ===
Year	Title	Role	Notes
2014	Teenage Mutant Ninja Turtles	Young April O'Neil	
2016	Thirsty	Girl in Pink	
2016	Nine Lives	Rebecca Brand	Main role
2024	Ick	Grace Kim	
2025	The Hermit	Lisa	
2026	Slay	Kat	

=== Television ===
Year	Title	Role	Notes
2015–2016	Difficult People	Renée Epstein	2 episodes
2015–2017	Supergirl	Young Kara Zor-El	7 episodes
2017–2019	A Series of Unfortunate Events	Violet Baudelaire	Lead role
2022	Evil	Candice B	1 episode
2026	Coven Academy	Briar	Lead role
