= The Pilgrims (band) =

American rock band

- Origin: Windsor, Vermont
- Genres: Alternative rock, Indie rock, Power pop, Pub rock
- Years active: 2010–2026
- Label: What Doth Life
- Members: Brendan D’Angelo; Chris Rosenquest; Chris Egner; Kiel Alarcon
- Past members: John DeMasi; Chris Goulet; Davis McGraw
- Website: www.pilgrimsvt.com

The Pilgrims are a rock band from Windsor, Vermont. Seven Days contributor Dan Bolles compared their style to alt-punk and indie rock, while John Powell, writing for Angelica Music, has likened them to rock and roll bands from the 1960s and 1970s. They are part of the Windsor, VT music collective What Doth Life, which has released albums by The Pilgrims, Giant Travel Avant Garde, Derek and The Demons, Carton, and Luke Chrisinger.

== Members ==
Current

- Brendan Dangelo – bass (2010–present)
- Chris Egner – drums, percussion (2011–present)
- Kiel Alarcon – guitar (2015–present)
- Chris Rosenquest – lead vocals (2015–present)

Former

- Davis McGraw – keyboard, guitar, mandolin, lead and backing vocals (2010–2013, 2017–2024)
- Chris Goulet – guitar, lead and backing vocals (2010–2019)
- John Demasi – drums (2010–2011)

== Discography ==
- Joking But Serious (2024)
- No Focus (2017)
- Shred Savage (2015)
- Home & Home Vol 2 Split (2014)
- BU$$ (2013)
- It's Not Pretty (2012)
- Natalie Goes To College (2012)
- Nobility (2011)

Year	Album details	Tracks
2011	Nobility: Released: 2011	No. / Title / Length; 1. / "American Eyes" / 3:43; 2. / "Pearl Street Blues" / 2:47; 3. / "Microphone" / 3:29; 4. / "Snowstorm" / 4:19; 5. / "Skint Cats" / 3:13; 6. / "Butter" / 2:42; Total length: / / 20:13
2012	Natalie Goes to College: Released: 2012	No. / Title / Length; 1. / "Idiots Abroad" / 3:48; 2. / "Gary Did Vomit" / 3:14; 3. / "Bad Crazy" / 2:46; 4. / "Natalie Goes to College" / 0:12; 5. / "Philibuster Brown" / 4:06; 6. / "Static Signals" / 3:40; Total length: / / 17:46
2012	It's Not Pretty: Released: Released September 12, 2012; Genre: Punk rock, pop rock, indie rock, garage rock; All songs written by The Pilgrims, except where noted	No. / Title / Writer(s) / Length; 1. / "That Gold" / / 2:05; 2. / "Bad Crazy" / / 2:27; 3. / "Glue" / / 2:34; 4. / "Be Alarmed" / / 4:02; 5. / "Snow Storm" / / 4:14; 6. / "Idiots Abroad" / / 3:53; 7. / "Cool" / / 4:55; 8. / "Philibuster Brown" / / 3:37; 9. / "Static Signals" / / 2:54; 10. / "American Eyes" / / 3:22; 11. / "Bronski" / / 1:50; 12. / "State of Green" / Lilum / 3:58; 13. / "Saint Paul" / / 3:32; Total length: / / / 42:27
2013	BU$$: Released: August 2, 2013; Genre: Punk rock, pop rock, indie rock, garage rock; All songs written by The Pilgrims, except where noted	No. / Title / Length; 1. / "Trust" / 3:32; 2. / "Graves" / 2:32; 3. / "Duck and Cover" / 3:09; 4. / "Yut" / 3:05; 5. / "Skint" / 2:43; 6. / "Gruppity" / 2:46; 7. / "Buss" / 4:57; 8. / "Lorraine" / 2:47; 9. / "The Miracle Worker" / 2:50; 10. / "Western Paradise" / 3:38; Total length: / / 31:59
2014	Home & Home Vol 2 Split: Released: 2014	No. / Title / Length; 1. / "Captain" / 2:10; 2. / "Blue Bloods" / 2:50; Total length: / / 5:00
2015	Shred Savage: Released: 2015	No. / Title / Length; 1. / "Weird" / 3:43; 2. / "Cool. Dad" / 4:31; 3. / "The Man's Best Friend" / 4:20; 4. / "Smokes Too Much" / 3:47; 5. / "Attitude City" / 4:33; 6. / "Wallet" / 3:29; Total length: / / 24:23
2017	No Focus: Released: 2017	No. / Title / Length; 1. / "Fuckuitude" / 3:05; 2. / "Treap Chick" / 3:09; 3. / "The Millenial Whoop" / 3:07; 4. / "KymPossible" / 3:22; 5. / "Tongue DeLength" / 3:21; 6. / "Barely Alive" / 3:16; 7. / "My Bad, Wrong Horse" / 2:35; 8. / "Gotsomeonya" / 3:22; 9. / "Dinky Betts" / 3:51; 10. / "I Miss My Wife" / 4:49; Total length: / / 33:57

== Singles ==
- Nantucket (2020)
- Mimosa Man (2019)
- Fav New Kid (2018)
- AA After Party (2018)
- Choreography (2018)
