= Nylon Moon =

Italian dream house production team

- Origin: Milan, Italy
- Genres: Dream house
- Years active: 1996–1997
- Label: DBX Records
- Past members: Daniele Maffei; Michele Generale

Nylon Moon was an Italian dream house production team, formed by Daniele Maffei (a.k.a. Daniele Gas) and Michele Generale. Their biggest hit was "Sky Plus", a piano-driven track which was one of the dream house hits during the mid-1990s, reaching #43 in the UK Singles Chart in April 1996. Other singles followed after this, although none reached the same degree of popularity. In October 1996, an album was released entitled, Heartage. Soon after, dream house music lost its popular appeal and Nylon Moon disbanded.

== Discography ==
=== Albums ===
Year	Album details
Heartage	Release date: October 1996; Label: DBX Records

=== Singles ===
Year	Single	Peak chart positions			Album
Year	Single	AUT	BEL (Vl)	UK	Album
1996	"Sky Plus"	33	38	43	Heartage
1996	"Heartage"	—	—	—	Heartage
1997	"Angels of Love"	—	—	—	Heartage
1997	"Poppy Field"	—	—	—	Heartage
"—" denotes releases that did not chart
