= Living in the Background (song) =

1986 single by Baltimora

Single by Baltimora

from the album Living in the Background
- Released: March 1986
- Genre: Italo disco
- Length: 6:05 (album version)
- Label: EMI (EEC); Manhattan Records (US)
- Songwriters: Maurizio Bassi; Naimy Hackett
- Producer: Maurizio Bassi

Baltimora singles chronology
"Woody Boogie" (1985)	"Living in the Background" (1986)	"Juke Box Boy" (1986)

Alternative cover
- Remix U.S.A. 1986

Audio
- "Living in the Background" on YouTube

"Living in the Background" is the title track and third single from Baltimora's debut album of the same name, and second released single in total. The song reached number 87 on the U.S. Billboard Hot 100. There was no video made for this single.

"Living in the Background" did not garner the same attention that their first single "Tarzan Boy" did, although it still maintains play on throwback stations such as KRTH101 in Los Angeles.

== Critical reception ==
Upon its release, Billboard wrote, "Italian singer abandons the jungle for the safety of the dancefloor."

== Track listing ==
Germany 12" Single

No.	Title	Length
1.	"Living in the Background" (Extended Version)	6:05
2.	"Running for Your Love" (Extended Version)	5:50
3.	"Living in the Background" (Instrumental Mix)	4:24

USA 12" Club Mix Promo Single

No.	Title	Length
1.	"Living in the Background" (Club Mix)	6:57
2.	"Living in the Background" (Single Version)	3:57
3.	"Living in the Background" (Instrumental)	6:04

7" single

No.	Title	Length
1.	"Living in the Background" (Single Version)	3:58
2.	"Chinese Restaurant" (Album Version)	5:14

Remix U.S.A. 1986

No.	Title	Length
1.	"Living in the Background" (Remix U.S.A. - Extended Version)	6:57
2.	"Living in the Background" (Remix U.S.A. - 7" Version)	3:57
3.	"Living in the Background" (Instrumental)	4:25

== Charts ==
Chart performance for "Living in the Background"
Chart (1986)	Peak position
Canada Top Singles (RPM)	96
US Billboard Hot 100	87
