= Jimmy McShane =

Northern Irish singer (1957–1995)

- McShane in 1987

Background information
- Also known as: Ruby
- Born: James Harry McShane; 23 May 1957; Derry, Northern Ireland
- Died: 29 March 1995 (aged 37) Derry, Northern Ireland
- Genres: Italo disco; synth-pop; new wave; dance-pop
- Occupation: Singer
- Years active: 1982–1993
- Formerly of: Baltimora

James Harry McShane (23 May 1957 – 29 March 1995) was a dancer and singer from Northern Ireland. He achieved recognition as the frontman of the Italo disco group Baltimora, most notably with their 1985 hit song "Tarzan Boy".

== Biography ==
=== Early life and Baltimora ===
James Harry McShane was born in Derry, Northern Ireland, on 23 May 1957. He was educated at Long Tower Primary School and then St Joseph's and St Peter's Secondary Schools. From a young age, he took a great interest in dancing and learned to play the guitar. In a 2018 interview, McShane's brother Damien said that McShane had been bullied growing up, but that at the time they had attributed it to his "loud personality," not realising that he was gay. After his education, he worked at Gransha Hospital and trained as a nurse with the Red Cross.

In the 1970s, McShane relocated to London to attend stage school and performed some small roles in a number of West End musicals. He then began working with English singer Dee D. Jackson and provided the "robotic" backing vocals on her 1978 hit "Automatic Lover". He toured Europe for 18 months as a stage dancer and backing singer with Jackson and her band. During this time, he discovered Italy and, after becoming attracted to the country's underground dance scene, relocated to Milan in 1983. He told Dick Clark on American Bandstand in 1986 that he fell in love with Italy, and would later become fluent in Italian and acquire Italian citizenship.

In 1984, EMI Italiana signed McShane to their roster after seeing his "exotic stage show". He then met Italian record producer and keyboardist Maurizio Bassi, with whom he created the music project Baltimora. The act found worldwide success with its most popular single, "Tarzan Boy", released in 1985. Some sources state that the lead vocals were performed by Bassi while McShane provided backing vocals, but this still remains uncertain, and McShane appears as the vocalist in the song's music video rather than Bassi. The band released two studio albums, Living in the Background (1985) and Survivor in Love (1987), before disbanding in 1988.

=== Final years and death ===
In 1992, following the death of his partner of nine years, McShane discovered he was HIV positive and returned to live with his family at his childhood home in Derry. While his family was happy about his return, this was not the case for everyone and indeed at one time he was explicitly attacked for being gay while at a house party in Carnhill; "They beat him, broke his nose and teeth, solely because he was gay," his brother recalled. On 25 November 1992, he appeared at the Rock Relief concert held at the local venue Rialto, where he provided backing vocals alongside Jeanette Hutton for rock band King Rat's set. On 15 February 1993, he was one of the judges for the Gweedor Bar/Harp Lager Battle of the Bands '93 final, held at the Guildhall. McShane also went on to perform vocals with the local band the Jaywalkers later in the year.

Inspired by the success of Peter Cunnah and his group D Ream, and with encouragement from his friends, McShane booked himself into the local Big River Studios in January 1994 to record some new tracks, with the frontman of the Jaywalkers, Jim Walker, as a collaborator. McShane told the Derry Journal that his new music was "much more funk/soul-influenced" than his previous work with Baltimora. None of the recordings were released to the public. In January 1995, McShane announced his intention to re-record "Tarzan Boy" for release as a charity single. All proceeds were to have gone to the Northern Ireland AIDS Helpline and the AIDS clinic at the Royal Victoria Hospital in Belfast. There were also future plans to collaborate with Peter Cunnah and D Ream.

McShane died of an AIDS-related illness at his family's home on 29 March 1995 at the age of 37. He is buried in Derry City Cemetery next to his father, who died three years prior.
