= Tarzan Boy =

1985 single by Baltimora

Single by Baltimora

from the album Living in the Background
- B-side: "DJ version"
- Released: 5 April 1985
- Genre: Italo disco; synth-pop
- Length: 6:15 (album version); 3:50 (single version); 3:37 (DJ edit)
- Label: EMI; Capitol/Manhattan
- Songwriters: Maurizio Bassi; Naimy Hackett
- Producer: Maurizio Bassi

Baltimora singles chronology
"Tarzan Boy" (1985)	"Woody Boogie" (1985)

Music video
- "Tarzan Boy" on YouTube

"Tarzan Boy" is the debut single by the Italian-based act Baltimora. The song was written by Maurizio Bassi and Naimy Hackett, and released in 1985 as the lead single from Baltimora's debut album, Living in the Background (1985). The song was remixed and re-released in 1993, and has been covered by several artists throughout the years.

The refrain uses Tarzan's cry as a melodic line. The song is rhythmical, with an electronic melody and simple lyrics. Baltimora are often considered a one-hit wonder due to the success they experienced with "Tarzan Boy". It features a melodic motif that was later named the millennial whoop.

The music video for the song features the frontman for the band's performances, Jimmy McShane, who was never heard singing the song because he lip synced it.

== Background ==
In a 1985 interview with Manchester Evening News, McShane said of the song and its success,

"It has been a big surprise but I'm not complaining! It's pure novelty. I do have a more serious side to me and with my band I present a much more upmarket set, but I think 'Tarzan Boy' does have something. I don't know what the future will bring, but I'm a serious musician and singer. I sing all kinds of music – I'm not a novelty merchant! You'll have to hear my album when it gets released."

In 1995, McShane announced his intention to re-record "Tarzan Boy" for release as a charity single. All proceeds were to have gone to the Northern Ireland AIDS Helpline and the AIDS clinic at the Royal Victoria Hospital in Belfast, but McShane died of an AIDS-related illness in March 1995 before he could re-record it.

== Chart performance ==
"Tarzan Boy" was an international hit, debuting in the top five Italian charts and performing well in several other European countries, including Spain, Germany, the Netherlands, and notably, France, where "Tarzan Boy" was most successful, topping the charts there for five consecutive weeks. In the United Kingdom, it reached number 3 in September 1985. The single had success in the United States (where it was released by EMI), with the single remaining on the Billboard Hot 100 chart for six months and ultimately peaking at number 13 in early 1986.

In 1993, "Tarzan Boy" was featured on the soundtrack of the American film Teenage Mutant Ninja Turtles III, both in its original form and as a new remix by Daniel Abraham. It was released as a single from the soundtrack and would re-enter the Billboard charts at number 68 and peak at number 51 five weeks later. It would spend an additional 12 weeks on the chart, exiting the Hot 100 on 12 June 1993.

== Critical reception ==
Upon its release in the US, Billboard wrote, "Disco novelty from Italy was a summertime smash in Europe, thanks to a maddeningly catchy swinging-through-the-vines hook."

== Uses in sports ==
AEW wrestler, "Jungle Boy" Jack Perry uses "Tarzan Boy" as his entrance music, and with Luchasaurus as Jurassic Express. As of the 2023 Major League Baseball season, "Tarzan Boy" was the walk-on song, or entrance music, played each time Mark Canha came to bat for the New York Mets.

Czech Extraliga team HC Sparta Praha has used the chorus of the song regularly since the 1986–1987 season in its home arenas as their official goal song, played each time the team scores a goal.

== Track listing and formats ==
=== Original version ===
7" single

1. "Tarzan Boy" – 3:48
2. "Tarzan Boy" (DJ version) – 3:36

12" single

1. "Tarzan Boy" (extended version) – 6:15
2. "Tarzan Boy" (DJ version) – 5:09

12" maxi

1. "Tarzan Boy" (extended dance version) – 6:16
2. "Tarzan Boy" (single version) – 3:49
3. "Tarzan Boy" (extended dub version) – 5:10

12" maxi – Summer version

1. "Tarzan Boy" (Summer version) – 6:40
2. "Tarzan Boy" (reprise) – 6:00

=== 1993 version ===
CD single

1. "Tarzan Boy" (original version) – 3:49
2. "Tarzan Boy" (1993 remix) – 3:49

12" single

1. "Tarzan Boy" (original version) – 3:49
2. "Tarzan Boy" (UK swing mix) – 3:18
3. "Tarzan Boy" (extended dub) – 5:10

CD maxi

1. "Tarzan Boy" (1993 remix) – 3:49
2. "Tarzan Boy" (extended 1993 remix) – 5:33
3. "Tarzan Boy" (extended dub mix) – 5:10

Cassette

1. "Tarzan Boy" (original version) – 3:49
2. "Tarzan Boy" (1993 remix) – 3:49
3. "Tarzan Boy" (original version) – 3:49
4. "Tarzan Boy" (1993 remix) – 3:49

CD maxi – Promo

1. "Tarzan Boy" (original version) – 3:45
2. "Tarzan Boy" (1993 remix) – 3:46
3. "Tarzan Boy" (extended 1993 remix) – 5:35
4. "Tarzan Boy" (UK swing mix) – 3:21
5. "Tarzan Boy" (extended dub) – 5:01

=== 2010 version ===
Streaming single

1. "Tarzan Boy" (Digital Remaster) – 3:49

== Charts ==
=== Weekly charts ===
1985–1986 weekly chart performance for "Tarzan Boy"
Chart (1985–1986)	Peak position
Australia (Kent Music Report)	16
Austria (Ö3 Austria Top 40)	2
Belgium (Ultratop 50 Flanders)	1
Canada Top Singles (RPM)	5
Denmark (IFPI)	1
Europe (European Top 100 Singles)	1
Finland (Suomen virallinen lista)	1
France (SNEP)	1
Ireland (IRMA)	2
Italy (Musica e dischi)	5
Luxembourg (Radio Luxembourg)	2
Netherlands (Dutch Top 40)	1
Netherlands (Single Top 100)	1
New Zealand (Recorded Music NZ)	34
Norway (VG-lista)	4
Portugal (AFP)	1
South Africa (Springbok Radio)	3
Spain (AFYVE)	1
Sweden (Sverigetopplistan)	2
Switzerland (Schweizer Hitparade)	4
UK Singles (Official Charts)	3
US Billboard Hot 100	13
US 12-inch Singles Sales (Billboard)	12
US Dance/Disco Club Play (Billboard)	6
US Cash Box Top 100	18
West Germany (GfK)	3

1993 weekly chart performance for "Tarzan Boy"
Chart (1993)	Peak position
US Billboard Hot 100	51
US Cash Box Top 100	54

=== Year-end charts ===
1985 year-end chart performance for "Tarzan Boy"
Chart (1985)	Position
Austria (Ö3 Austria Top 40)	18
Belgium (Ultratop 50 Flanders)	4
Canada Top Singles (RPM)	53
Europe (European Top 100 Singles)	3
France (IFOP)	10
Netherlands (Dutch Top 40)	17
Netherlands (Single Top 100)	21
Switzerland (Schweizer Hitparade)	2
UK Singles (Gallup)	44
West Germany (Media Control)	9

1986 year-end chart performance for "Tarzan Boy"
Chart (1986)	Position
US Billboard Hot 100	73
US Dance Club Play (Billboard)	50

1985–1989 chart performance for "Tarzan Boy"
Chart (1985–1989)	Position
Europe (European Hot 100 Singles)	98

== Certifications ==
Certifications for "Tarzan Boy"
Region	Certification	Certified units/sales
Canada (Music Canada)	Gold	50,000^{^}
France (SNEP)	Gold	500,000^{*}
Spain (Promusicae)	Gold	25,000^{^}
United Kingdom (BPI)	Silver	250,000^{^}
^{*} Sales figures based on certification alone.^{^} Shipments figures based on certification alone.

== Cover versions ==
- In 1986, Hungarian band Neoton Família covered "Tarzan Boy" on their album of cover songs titled 'Tarzan Boy - Disco Party '86'.
- In 1989, the Hindi song "Aaya Mausam Dosti Ka", from the Bollywood soundtrack for the film Maine Pyar Kiya was heavily influenced by "Tarzan Boy".
- In 2006, the song was covered by Bango, and achieved a minor success, peaking at number 37 in France.
- In 2008, a cover by Bad Influence featuring Dyce reached number 9 in Sweden.
- "Tarzan Boy" is a bonus track on the Japanese edition of Phantoma, the sixth studio album by Canadian power metal group Unleash the Archers, released by Napalm Records on 10 May 2024.

== See also ==
- List of Dutch Top 40 number-one singles of 1985
- List of European number-one hits of 1985
- List of number-one singles of 1985 (France)
- List of number-one singles of 1985 (Spain)
