= Baltimora =

Italian music project

- Origin: Milan, Italy
- Genres: Italo disco; new wave
- Years active: 1984–1987
- Labels: EMI Italiana; Capitol
- Past members: Jimmy McShane; Maurizio Bassi; Naimy Hackett

Baltimora was an Italian music project from Milan, active from 1984 to 1987. They are best known for their 1985 single "Tarzan Boy" and are often considered a one-hit wonder in the United Kingdom and the United States. In other European countries, including their native Italy, Baltimora scored a follow-up hit "Woody Boogie" the same year.

== History ==
=== Early years ===
In early 1984, Maurizio Bassi, a music producer and musician from Milan, met Jimmy McShane, a native of Derry, Northern Ireland. They decided to form an act fronted by McShane, a trained singer, dancer and actor, who had previously tried to break into the West End theatre scene and toured with Dee D. Jackson. McShane and Bassi chose the name Baltimora when, one evening together, McShane took a map of the United States, closed his eyes and happened to place his finger on Baltimore. They changed the final letter to an 'a' to make the name more in keeping with the act's Italian roots.

Bassi recruited prominent Italian sessionmen to record their first album, including Giorgio Cocilovo on guitar and Gabriele "Lele" Melotti on drums. Fellow Italo disco producer Tom Hooker has claimed that Baltimora's lead vocals were performed by Maurizio Bassi, as he'd done with Carrara, with McShane sometimes providing the backing vocals. The bulk of Baltimora's song writing fell on Bassi and American lyricist Naimy Hackett, though McShane wrote the lyrics to their track "Survivor in Love".

=== Success with "Tarzan Boy" ===
Baltimora's first single, "Tarzan Boy", was released in April 1985, and became a huge European success, peaking at No. 6 on the Italian single chart and entering the top 5 in numerous European countries, including West Germany, Switzerland, Austria, Sweden, France, the Netherlands and Norway. The song eventually made it to the United Kingdom charts, where it reached No. 3 in August 1985.

"Tarzan Boy" was released in Canada in October 1985 and peaked on the Canadian charts at No. 5 by the end of the year. However, it took a while for the single to enter the Hot 100 single chart in the United States (where it was released on EMI). When it did, it remained on the Billboard Hot 100 chart for six months, peaking at No. 13 in February 1986. Baltimora performed on the American TV show Solid Gold, which helped further their success in America. The second single, "Woody Boogie", which also gained notable success, entered the top 20 in West Germany, Switzerland and Sweden.

Baltimora's first album, Living in the Background, was released in Europe at the end of 1985 and in United States in 1986. Despite the success of "Tarzan Boy", Living in the Background only charted moderately, entering the top 20 album charts only in a few countries in Europe, including Sweden, reaching the no. 49 spot on the US charts.

When Baltimora's second album, Survivor in Love (1987) and the single "Key Key Karimba" failed to match the success of previous releases, Baltimora lost label support and Bassi decided to disband.

Jimmy McShane died of an AIDS-related illness in March 1995.

== Studio personnel ==
- Maurizio Bassi: session arranger, musician, producer, and songwriter from Milan, Italy.
- Gaetano Leandro is an Italian pop keyboardist known for his collaboration with American singer Amii Stewart. He joined the group in the studio for the Survivor in Love album, supplementing Bassi's keyboards.
- Giorgio Cocilovo (born 1956) is an Italian jazz fusion guitarist and music teacher from Milan.
- Claudio Bazzari (Milan, 12 September 1949) is an Italian blues and country rhythm guitarist, he has played in various groups and as a session musician and has collaborated with many artists, including Fabrizio De André and Mario Lavezzi.
- Pier Michelatti is an Italian session bassist, known for his collaboration with Pink Project, Fabrizio and Cristiano De André and Baltimora.
- Dino D'Autorio (born 1 February 1954) is an Italian pop, rock, jazz, funk and blues bassist, and music teacher/arranger from Penne, Italy. He replaced Pier Michelatti as Baltimora's bassist in 1987.
- Gabriele "Lele" Melotti (born 20 September 1953) is an Italian session drummer and percussionist from Bologna, Italy.

== Style ==
Baltimora's music style is mainly described as Italo disco and sometimes as new wave, including their first album, Living in the Background.

== Discography ==
=== Studio albums ===
Title	Album details	Peak chart positions			Certifications
Title	Album details	CAN	SWE	US	Certifications
Living in the Background	Released: 4 September 1985; Label: EMI; Format: CS, CD, LP	49	18	49	CAN: Gold
World Re-Mix	Released: 1986; Label: EMI; Format: CS, LP	—	—	—	
Survivor in Love	Released: 1987; Label: EMI; Format: CD, LP	—	—	—	
"—" denotes a recording that did not chart or was not released in that territory.

=== Compilation albums ===
Title	Album details
Tarzan Boy: The World of Baltimora	Release date: 26 November 2010; Label: EMI; Format: CD, digital download

=== Singles ===
Title	Year	Peak chart positions										Certifications	Album
Title	Year	ITA	AUT	CAN	FRA	GER	NED	SWE	SWI	UK	US	Certifications	Album
"Tarzan Boy"	1985	6	2	5	1	3	1	2	4	3	13	CAN: Gold; FRA: Gold; UK: Silver	Living in the Background
"Woody Boogie"	1985	18	—	—	—	20	32	4	15	114	—		Living in the Background
"Living in the Background"	1985	—	—	96	—	—	—	—	—	—	87		Living in the Background
"Juke Box Boy"	1986	—	—	—	—	—	—	—	—	—			Living in the Background
"Key Key Karimba"	1987	37	—	—	—	—	—	—	—	—	—		Survivor in Love
"Global Love" (with Linda Wesley)	1987	—	—	—	—	—	—	—	—	—	—		Survivor in Love
"Call Me in the Heart of the Night"	1988	—	—	—	—	—	—	—	—	—	—		Survivor in Love
"—" denotes a recording that did not chart or was not released in that territory.
