= Paul Hardcastle (album) =

Studio album by Paul Hardcastle
- Released: November 1985
- Recorded: 1984–1985
- Studio: Sound Suite (London)
- Genres: Chill-out; boogie; dance-pop; electro; jazz
- Length: 45:25
- Label: Chrysalis
- Producer: Paul Hardcastle

Paul Hardcastle chronology
Rain Forest (1985)	Paul Hardcastle (1985)	No Winners (1988)

Professional ratings
Review scores
Source	Rating
AllMusic	4.5/5 stars

Paul Hardcastle is an album by crossover jazz artist Paul Hardcastle, released in 1985 on the Chrysalis Records label.

The album featured the major hit "19", as well as the further top ten "Don't Waste My Time".

== Track listing ==
All songs written by Paul Hardcastle, except "Just for Money" co-written with Kim Fuller, and "19", co-written with Jonas McCord and William Couturié.

Side 1
No.	Title	Length
1.	"In the Beginning"	2:04
2.	"19"	6:19
3.	"King Tut"	3:57
4.	"Don't Waste My Time"	4:30
5.	"Central Park"	4:02
Total length:		21:26

Side 2
No.	Title	Length
1.	"Just for Money"	5:08
2.	"Moonhopper"	4:18
3.	"Better"	2:58
4.	"Strollin'"	3:32
5.	"Rainforest"	7:26
Total length:		23:59

== Personnel ==
- Paul Hardcastle – all instruments
- Janice Hoyte – backing vocals (2)
- Clark Peters – voice (2)
- Carol Kenyon – vocals (4)
- Tessa Niles – backing vocals (6)
- Linda Taylor – backing vocals (6)
- Bob Hoskins – voice (6)
- Laurence Olivier – voice (6)
- Ed O'Ross – voice (6)
- Alan Talbot – voice (6)
- Kevin Henry – vocals (8)

Production

- Paul Hardcastle – producer
- Alvin Clark – engineer
- Mike Prior – photography
- Simon Fuller – management

== Charts ==
Chart (1985)	Peak position
UK Albums (Official Charts)	53

== Certification ==
Certifications
Region	Certification	Certified units/sales
United Kingdom (BPI)	Silver	60,000^{^}
^{^} Shipments figures based on certification alone.
