= First Light =

First Light may refer to:

== Science and technology ==
- First light (astronomy), the first observation with a newly commissioned telescope
- First light (cosmology), the light emitted from the first generation of stars, known as population III stars
- Nautical dawn, the time before sunrise when the sky begins to brighten
- First Light Fusion, a company developing a nuclear fusion reactor

== Arts and entertainment ==
=== Literature ===
- First Light (Ganguly novel), by Sunil Gangopadhyay
- First Light (Preston book), a 1987 nonfiction book on astronomy by Richard Preston
- First Light (Stead novel), a 2007 science fiction novel for children by Rebecca Stead
- First Light (Wellum book), a 2002 memoir by Geoffrey Wellum
- First Light, a 1987 novel by Charles Baxter
- First Light, a 1989 novel by Peter Ackroyd

=== Music ===
==== Albums ====
- First Light (Easy Star All-Stars album) or the title song, 2011
- First Light (The Enid album), 2014
- First Light (Family of Mann album), 1974
- First Light (Freddie Hubbard album) or the title song, 1971
- First Light (Richard and Linda Thompson album) or the title song, 1978
- First Light (Wishbone Ash album), 2007

==== Songs ====
- "First Light" (song), by Lana Del Rey for the video game 007 First Light, 2026
- "First Light", by Harold Budd and Brian Eno from Ambient 2: The Plateaux of Mirror, 1980
- "First Light", by Shadow Gallery from Legacy, 2001
- "First Light", by Converge from You Fail Me, 2004
- "First Light", by Moonspell from Night Eternal, 2008
- "First Light", by Paradise Lost from Faith Divides Us – Death Unites Us, 2009
- "First Light", by Starset from Transmissions, 2014
- "First Light", by Hozier from Unreal Unearth, 2023

==== Other uses in music ====
- First Light (band), an English funk project of Paul Hardcastle
- "First Light", an instrumental piece by Camel from Rain Dances, 1977
- First Light: An Oratorio, a 2005 composition by Sally Lutyens

=== Other media ===
- "First Light" (Cloak & Dagger), a television episode
- First Light (2015 film), a 2015 Italian film directed by Vincenzo Marra
- At First Light (film), a 2018 Canadian film, titled First Light in some countries
- First Light (2025 film), a 2025 Filipino-Australian film directed by James J. Robinson
- First Light (radio program), an American syndicated talk program hosted by Michael Toscano
- 007 First Light, a 2026 James Bond video game
- Infamous First Light, a 2014 expansion to the video game Infamous Second Son
- First Light Festival, an annual free midsummer festival in Lowestoft, Suffolk, England

== See also ==
- At First Light (disambiguation)
- Last Light (disambiguation)
