= At First Light =

At First Light may refer to:

- At First Light (band), an Irish Celtic musical group
- At First Light (film), a 2018 Canadian film

== See also ==
- First Light (disambiguation)
