= Twice Upon a Time (1983 film) =

1983 film by John Korty

- Theatrical release poster
- Directed by: John Korty; Charles Swenson
- Screenplay by: John Korty; Charles Swenson; Suella Kennedy; Bill Couturié
- Story by: John Korty; Bill Couturié; Suella Kennedy
- Produced by: Bill Couturié
- Starring: Lorenzo Music; Julie Payne; James Cranna; Hamilton Camp; Marshall Efron; Judith Kahan Kampmann
- Narrated by: Paul Frees
- Edited by: Jennifer Gallagher
- Music by: Ken Melville; Dawn Atkinson
- Production companies: Korty Films; Lucasfilm
- Distributed by: The Ladd Company (through Warner Bros.)
- Release date: August 5, 1983
- Running time: 75 minutes
- Country: United States
- Language: English
- Budget: $3 million
- Box office: $5,000

Twice Upon a Time is a 1983 American animated adventure-fantasy-comedy film co-directed by John Korty and Charles Swenson from a screenplay by Korty, Swenson, Suella Kennedy, and Bill Couturié. The first animated film produced by George Lucas, it uses a form of cut-out animation which the filmmakers called "Lumage", involving prefabricated cut-out elements that the animators moved on a light table, emulating stained glass. The film features improvised dialogue and interspersed live-action footage and background stills.

The distributor's financial weakness and an editing dispute over profanity contributed to the film's failure upon release and its persistent obscurity, until Warner Archive began to offer it on DVD in 2015.

== Plot ==
In the eternally busy city of Din, the black-and-white Rushers constantly go about their business in a fast-paced way and stop only to sleep due to their Cosmic Clock getting wound too tightly. Din lies between two worlds that create dreams to deliver to the sleeping Rushers – one is the bright and cheerful Frivoli, where Greensleeves and his Figmen of Imagination bring sweet dreams. The other is the Murkworks, a dark and dingy factory home to vultures who drop nightmare bombs. The evil Synonymess Botch, a maniacal ruler of the Murkworks, wants to foil Greenie's efforts and subject the Rushers to non-stop waking nightmares. He uses his vultures to kidnap the Figs and Greensleeves, but not before Greensleeves writes an S.O.S. to Frivoli.

Meanwhile, two misfits – known as Ralph, the All-Purpose Animal (named so for his somewhat unreliable shapeshifting abilities), and Mumford, a Chaplinesque mime – are put on trial for their incompetence at work. They are determined to prove themselves when they meet Flora Fauna, Greensleeves's niece, who found her uncle's S.O.S. and wants to rescue him. Botch spies on the three through Ibor, his robot gorilla, and uses Ralph and Mum's desire to be heroes to his advantage. Botch deceives the three, claiming to be a friend of Greenie and telling them that Greensleeves can be saved if they go into Din and take the main spring from the Cosmic Clock. Flora stays behind to act the part of the damsel in distress for Botch's nightmares.

Mumford and Ralph release the spring, which causes time to freeze. They chase the spring throughout Din, but Botch's vultures steal the spring and begin planting every nightmare bomb in the Murkworks' inventory all over Din. A Fairy Godmother (FGM) twinkles in to tell Mumford and Ralph that they have been tricked and gives them three dimes to make a phone booth appear in case they need her help. FGM also recruits the help of the dim-witted but musclebound Rod Rescueman to aid them. However, Rod is more interested in rescuing Fauna and abandons the boys to find her.

Ralph and Mumford find nightmare bombs scattered in an office, ready to be set off by Botch once it starts time again. Mumford accidentally detonates a bomb, and the two are trapped in a nightmare in which office supplies nearly kill them. When they are finally freed from the nightmare, the Fairy Godmother transports them back to Frivoli, suggests that they give up after all their mistakes, and fires them from the hero business. It further strengthens Ralph and Mumford's resolve to do right. Meanwhile, Rod "rescues" Flora from the Murkworks and attempts to get a kiss from her. She tries to escape from his floating apartment in the sky and falls, landing on a mechanical serpent that attempts to stop Ralph and Mumford from reaching the Murkworks. The trio and Rod storm their way in with the help of Scuzzbopper, Botch's former nightmare screenwriter, who decides to aid them after Botch cruelly discards his recently completed "Great Amurkian Novel."

Rod and Flora rescue Greenie and the Figs but contend with Ibor. Rod tries to save Flora again but fails, and Flora destroys the robot herself. At the same time, Botch has his head vulture, Rudy, fly the spring back to Din as the final phase of his plan. When Ralph, Mumford, and Scuzzbopper enter Botch's office, he has his pet rat attack them, but Scuzzbopper tricks it into chasing a bowling ball out a window. Botch retreats to a control room housing his master nightmare bomb button, "The Big Red One," with Ralph and Mumford chasing him. Ralph finally manages to control his shapeshifting to get through Botch's arsenal of booby traps and flies into the control room, while Mumford struggles through the traps and into the barrel of Botch's cannon. In the form of a fly, Ralph tricks Botch into pressing The Big Red One, detonating all the nightmare bombs before Rudy can put the spring back in the Cosmic Clock, the still-immobilized Rushers being unaffected. An enraged Botch is about to kill Ralph for ruining his plans when one last nightmare bomb appears, about to blow. Terrified of being subjected to his nightmare, Botch gets knocked out the window. The bomb turns out to be Mumford, who had stretched his hat over himself and used a cigar to simulate nightmare smoke. Ralph and Mumford consider themselves heroes, while Botch is carried away by his vultures.

Scuzzbopper, Flora, and Rod assume command of the Murkworks, with Flora giving a parting kiss to Ralph and Mumford for helping to save Greenie. As the two heroes leave, the Fairy Godmother congratulates them and allows them to keep their last dime as a symbol of good luck. The spring returns to the Cosmic Clock of its own will and restarts the flow of time, but at a pace where the Rushers can enjoy their lives.

== Cast ==
- Lorenzo Music as Ralph, the All-Purpose Animal
- Julie Payne as Flora Fauna
- Marshall Efron as Synonamess Botch
- Hamilton Camp as Greensleeves
- James Cranna as Rod Rescueman / Scuzzbopper / Frivoli Foreman
- Paul Frees as Narrator / Chef of State / Judges / Bailiff
- Judith Kahan Kampmann as The Fairy Godmother ("F.G.M.")
- Mum as Himself

== Production ==
John Korty developed the "Lumage" animation process over twenty years, providing animated segments for projects such as The Electric Company and Sesame Street. Lumage was a type of stop motion animation in which cut-out shapes are photographed on large fields of glass lit primarily from below, as opposed to the standard 12-inch fields used in cel animation. In 1979, Korty set his sights on producing a feature film as a showcase for the Lumage technique as it was more economical than cel animation with 75 minutes of Lumage animation coming in under $4 million vs 90 minutes of cel animation costing $15 million. Korty raised $130,000 to develop a script and produce a sample reel for potential investors which was screened for George Lucas who became an executive producer shortly thereafter with Lucas then taking the project to Alan Ladd Jr.'s The Ladd Company who had greenlit Lucas' Star Wars.

=== Alternate versions ===
There were many different versions of this movie because the producers could only hire improvisational comedians.

In one version, Greensleeves is not kidnapped at the beginning. Ralph and Mumford release and lose the spring, then stop by a bar where they meet Greensleeves, who urges the boys to get the spring. Later, the spring escapes the vultures and finds its way to Greenie, who is then asked to put the spring back in the cosmic clock. At this point, the vultures swoop in and capture Greensleeves and the spring.

Another version of the movie included Synonymess Botch swearing throughout the film. From the outset, director John Korty did not want to use the dialogue of the original script, but actor Marshall Efron thought his lines were perfect and played up the raunchier aspects of his character. Some lines were selected by producer Bill Couturié as he felt it would help the film appeal to older audiences. Korty was unaware of this until opening night and was angry about how Marshall Efron's lines were delivered from the script. Most theaters that showed the film also played the version with the profanity instead of reprinting it with the family-friendly cut. Although the censored version was not rated, the version with the profanity was given a PG rating.

== Release ==
Around the time Twice Upon a Time was completed, The Ladd Company was nearing bankruptcy and had a choice of either putting the movie into limited release or worldwide release, facing a similar difficulty with The Right Stuff. In the end, they decided to give it a limited release on August 5, 1983; it bombed at the box office with $5,000 against its $3 million budget. The failure of this and The Right Stuff caused The Ladd Company to shut down the next year.

=== Home media and television ===
A few years later, Twice Upon a Time was shown by HBO. However, the version that HBO received and showed was the version with the profanity. When Korty found out, he immediately contacted HBO, threatening legal action if this version was aired again. After three showings, HBO suspended broadcasts of the film until supplied with a new family-friendly cut from Korty. This new cut filled-out the remaining showings of Twice Upon a Time scheduled that month, prompting complaints of "censored" movies being shown on HBO. Following these complaints, HBO chose to never air the film again on their service. Two months later, Showtime and over-the-air pay television service Spectrum acquired rights to show the film, but only the Korty-approved version; this version had the complete "Out on My Own" scene as well as the uncut final reel of the film that was absent from the later home video version.

In 1991, the film was released on VHS and laserdisc. This release contains John Korty's intended family-friendly cut, with some scenes roughly trimmed short to remove profanity that was still present. Years later, Amazon made the film temporarily available for rental download via Amazon Unbox; however, the film is unavailable there nowadays due to licensing restrictions.

Its cult status boosted when the film began to be shared on viral video sites. Perhaps in response to the lack of official support for the film, several bootleg copies of the original, uncut version were available via torrents. The film aired on the Disney Channel as part of its Wonderful World of Disney movie block in 1997; it also aired as part of Cartoon Network's Cartoon Theatre on September 12, 1998. It has also been shown early mornings on Turner Classic Movies, first on February 1, 2015, as part of the channel's TCM Underground block, and again on May 20, 2019.

The film was released in a Special Edition DVD on September 29, 2015, through Warner Archive. The DVD contained both cuts, an audio commentary with John Korty and selected crew members (including Henry Selick), as well as the original theatrical trailer and TV spots.

== Reception ==
On the review aggregator website Rotten Tomatoes, 80% of 10 critics' reviews are positive.

Contemporary reviews were mixed to positive. Sheila Benson of the Los Angeles Times wrote that "lovers of animation may have a field day" with the film, but that its "brilliant fragments" did not add up to a complete whole. The Oregonian called it a "delightful animated film", and Michael Dare of LA Weekly wrote that the film was "charming without ever getting too cutesy".

== Soundtrack ==
The soundtrack features several songs performed by Maureen McDonald written by Tom Ferguson, Maureen McDonald, and her brother Michael. Also included is one song performed by Bruce Hornsby and written by Hornsby and his brother John, as well as one track performed by Lawrence Welk and His Orchestra.

The original score was composed by Dawn Atkinson and Ken Melville, who also served as producers for the original songs. They had previously worked with John Korty and Bill Couturié on the ABC TV special Vietnam Requiem; Melville had also worked with Couturié on the short film Porklips Now, composing part of the score alongside director Ernie Fosselius, while Atkinson had worked as a freelance composer on commercial projects for various companies.

The score was recorded in 1982 with the London Symphony Orchestra at Abbey Road Studios, with Dawn Atkinson serving as orchestrator and conductor; at age 28, she became the second woman to conduct the LSO. According to a comment she made on the film's blogspot page under the username "birdzerker", over more than ten sessions were held for the score, and Bill Bruford provided the Simmons drums (credited in the film as "Vulture Percussion") for certain parts of the score. Unfortunately, following the film's initial failure, the score was never released to the public.

Dawn Atkinson later became a music producer for Windham Hill Records from 1986 to 1993, while Ken Melville worked again with Bill Couturié on the LaserDisc arcade game Freedom Fighter. He later co-founded Digital Pictures, which produced games such as the infamous Night Trap, and Ground Zero: Texas, the latter based on original concepts by Melville. Ken Melville passed away on February 1, 2014.
