= 19 (song) =

Single by Paul Hardcastle

from the album Paul Hardcastle
- B-side: "Fly by Night"
- Released: April 1985
- Genre: Synth-pop; electro; new wave
- Length: 6:20 (album version); 3:37 (single version)
- Label: Chrysalis
- Songwriters: Paul Hardcastle; William Couturié; Mike Oldfield; Jonas McCord
- Producer: Paul Hardcastle

Paul Hardcastle singles chronology
"Eat Your Heart Out" (1984)	"19" (1985)	"Rainforest" (1985)

Audio sample
- file; help

"19" is a song by the English musician Paul Hardcastle, released as the first single from his eponymous fourth studio album Paul Hardcastle (1985).

The song has a strong anti-war message, focusing on the United States' involvement in the Vietnam War and the effect it had on the soldiers who served. The track was notable for early use of sampled and processed speech, in particular a synthesized stutter effect used on the words "nineteen" and "destruction" and "Saigon". It also includes various non-speech, re-dubbed sampling, such as crowd noise and a military bugle call.

"19" features sampled narration (voiced by Peter Thomas), out-of-context interview dialogue ("I wasn't really sure what was going on") and news reports from Vietnam Requiem, the ABC television documentary about the post-traumatic stress disorder (PTSD) suffered by Vietnam veterans. In 2009, the song placed at 73 on VH1's 100 Greatest One-Hit Wonders of the 80s.

"19" had huge international success in the charts; it went to No. 1 in the UK for five weeks, as well as a number of other countries worldwide. "19" became the top-selling single in 13 countries for 1985. This was helped by international versions of the song spoken by well-known local news anchors in French, Spanish, German and Japanese. The song received the Ivor Novello Award for Best-selling single of 1985. The song's English-language release came in three different 12" versions: "Extended Version", "Destruction Mix" and "The Final Story", all with an alternative cover design.

== Background and content ==
Hardcastle was inspired to create the song after watching Vietnam Requiem (1982), and comparing his own life at 19 to those of the soldiers featured: "...what struck me was how young the soldiers were: the documentary said their average age was 19. I was out having fun in pubs and clubs when I was 19, not being shoved into jungles and shot at."

The title "19" comes from the documentary's narrative that the average age of an American combat soldier in the war was 19, as compared to 26 in World War II. This claim has since been disputed. Undisputed statistics do not exist, although Southeast Asia Combat Area Casualties Current File (CACCF), the source for the Vietnam Veterans Memorial, shows a large number of deaths (38%) were ages 19 or 20. According to the same source, 23 is the average age at time of death (or time of declaration of death). The song also comments that while the tour of duty was longer during World War II, soldiers in Vietnam were subjected to hostile fire more frequently: "almost every day".

Musically, the song was inspired by electro, particularly Afrika Bambaataa, although Hardcastle also "added a bit of jazz and a nice melody", and beyond the sampling of the documentary narration, the song incorporated pieces of interviews with soldiers. The song's pivotal hook, the repetitive "N-n-n-n-nineteen", was chosen due to the limitations of the early sampling technology used. The E-mu Emulator could only sample for two seconds, so the hook was based around "the only bit of the narrative that made sense in two seconds". Hardcastle was not optimistic about the song's chances in the charts. His previous two singles for independent labels had failed to make it into the UK's top 40 and the musical policy at Radio 1 was felt to be unsupportive of dance music. News interest in the song helped, with the tenth anniversary of the end of the Vietnam War seeing Hardcastle interviewed by Alastair Stewart of ITN.

Tony Blackburn, then breakfast DJ for Radio London, was an early supporter of the song and it quickly reached number 1 in the UK and most of the world. Hardcastle produced different mixes of the song to help maintain interest in it. Although the song only reached number 15 in the United States chart, Hardcastle claims "it outsold everybody else for three weeks solid, it only reached number 15, because back then the chart was based on airplay as well as sales". The song was held back in the US by some radio stations refusing to play it, feeling that the song took an anti-American stance, something Hardcastle denies, noting he "had tons of letters from Vietnam vets thanking [him] for doing something for them".

The song's reliance on sampling also caused problems with legal clearance. Ken Grunbaum recalled in 2012 that "there were no precedents for something like this. We ended up having to pay royalties to the narrator, Peter Thomas."

=== 19 PTSD ===
In 2015, Hardcastle released a charity version of the song for the Talking2Minds organisation, who raise money for troops suffering from Post Traumatic Stress Disorder. This PTSD remix was also found on 19: The 30th Anniversary Collection, a compilation album which included 14 versions of the song such as the Cryogenic Freeze Remix and a version which included samples of Marvin Gaye.

== Music video ==
After the song's unexpected, rapid climb to the top of the UK Singles Chart, Chrysalis asked Vietnam Requiem directors Jonas McCord and Bill Couturié to rush a video into production. Due to the lack of a band able to perform the song, the video was primarily composed of clips from the Vietnam Requiem documentary, edited together by Ken Grunbaum. The first version of the video included footage from the television networks NBC and ABC, including a newscast by ABC anchorman Frank Reynolds. After it was aired on MTV in the US, NBC and ABC objected to the "bad taste" of using the serious clips in a "trivial" form of "propaganda". McCord and Couturié were forced to produce a new cut incorporating public domain footage, but ABC permitted Reynolds' audio to remain. Couturié asserted at the time that the television networks opposed the video because it involved rock music:

What is the difference between the words in our song and the 7 o'clock news? The only difference is rock'n'roll. And why did they love the documentary and hate the video so much? Every word in the song is from the film, and there was never any argument with the facts. The only difference is the music.

== Critical reception ==
John Leland of Spin wrote, "This is Hardcastle’s sharpest slice of beatbox muzak to date, but it's still a pain in the ass. The power of the track comes from a deadpan voiceover. This hits like all political chic: momentarily chilling, but not redemptive."

== Charts and certifications ==
=== Weekly charts ===
Chart (1985)	Peak position
Australia (Kent Music Report)	10
Austria (Ö3 Austria Top 40)	1
Belgium (Ultratop 50 Flanders)	1
Canada Top Singles (RPM)	2
Europe (Eurochart Hot 100)	1
France (SNEP)	15
Ireland (IRMA)	1
Italy (Musica e dischi)	1
Netherlands (Dutch Top 40)	1
Netherlands (Single Top 100)	1
New Zealand (Recorded Music NZ)	1
Norway (VG-lista)	1
South Africa (Springbok Radio)	4
Spain (AFE)	2
Sweden (Sverigetopplistan)	1
Switzerland (Schweizer Hitparade)	1
UK Singles (Official Charts)	1
US Billboard Hot 100	15
US Billboard Hot Black Singles	8
US Billboard Hot Dance Club Play	1
US Billboard Hot Dance Music/Maxi-Singles Sales	1
US Cash Box	21
West Germany (GfK)	1

Chart (2011)	Peak position
UK Singles (Official Charts)	40

=== Year-end charts ===
Chart (1985)	Rank
Australia (Kent Music Report)	93
Austria (Ö3 Austria Top 40)	14
Belgium (Ultratop 50 Flanders)	15
Canada Top Singles (RPM)	38
Germany (Official German Charts)	3
Netherlands (Dutch Top 40)	5
Netherlands (Single Top 100)	3
New Zealand (Recorded Music NZ)	6
Switzerland (Schweizer Hitparade)	7
UK Singles (Official Charts Company)	4

=== Certifications and sales ===
Region	Certification	Certified units/sales
Canada (Music Canada)	Gold	50,000^{^}
Germany (BVMI)	Gold	500,000^{^}
United Kingdom (BPI)	Gold	785,000
^{^} Shipments figures based on certification alone.

== Parody ==
In the same year of release, comedian Rory Bremner, using the band name The Commentators, released a parodied version of the song as "N-N-Nineteen Not Out", about the England cricket team's poor performance in test matches, with references to the team's disastrous 1984 home series against the West Indies in which captain David Gower had averaged 19.

== Other uses in popular culture ==
Manchester United used the "19" soundtrack to celebrate their 19th Premier League title in May 2011, and the song made a reappearance in the UK Top 40.

== See also ==
- I Was Only 19, a 1983 song of similar themes from the perspective of an Australian Vietnam War soldier
- List of anti-war songs
- Lists of number-one singles (Austria)
- List of Dutch Top 40 number-one singles of 1985
- List of number-one hits of 1985 (Germany)
- List of number-one singles of 1985 (Ireland)
- List of number-one hits of 1985 (Italy)
- List of number-one singles from the 1980s (New Zealand)
- List of number-one songs in Norway
- List of number-one singles and albums in Sweden
- List of number-one singles of the 1980s (Switzerland)
- List of UK Singles Chart number ones of the 1980s
- List of Billboard number-one dance/disco singles of 1985
