= List of number-one singles of 1985 (Ireland) =

This is a list of singles which have reached number one on the Irish Singles Chart in 1985.

Week ending	Song	Artist	Ref.
5 January	"Do They Know It's Christmas?"	Band Aid	
12 January	"Do They Know It's Christmas?"	Band Aid	
19 January	"Do They Know It's Christmas?"	Band Aid	
26 January	"I Want to Know What Love Is"	Foreigner	
2 February	"I Want to Know What Love Is"	Foreigner	
9 February	"I Know Him So Well"	Elaine Paige and Barbara Dickson	
16 February	"I Know Him So Well"	Elaine Paige and Barbara Dickson	
23 February	"I Know Him So Well"	Elaine Paige and Barbara Dickson	
2 March	"I Know Him So Well"	Elaine Paige and Barbara Dickson	
9 March	"I Know Him So Well"	Elaine Paige and Barbara Dickson	
16 March	"You Spin Me Round (Like a Record)"	Dead or Alive	
23 March	"Easy Lover"	Philip Bailey and Phil Collins	
30 March	"Easy Lover"	Philip Bailey and Phil Collins	
23 March	"Show Some Concern"	The Concerned	(Note: Two records were listed as number one this week)
30 March	"Show Some Concern"	The Concerned	(Note: Two records were listed as number one this week)
6 April	"Show Some Concern"	The Concerned	
13 April	"We Are the World"	USA for Africa	
20 April	"We Are the World"	USA for Africa	
27 April	"We Are the World"	USA for Africa	
4 May	"We Are the World"	USA for Africa	
11 May	"The Unforgettable Fire"	U2	
18 May	"The Unforgettable Fire"	U2	
25 May	"19"	Paul Hardcastle	
1 June	"19"	Paul Hardcastle	
8 June	"I'm on Fire" / "Born in the U.S.A."	Bruce Springsteen	
15 June	"I'm on Fire" / "Born in the U.S.A."	Bruce Springsteen	
22 June	"You'll Never Walk Alone"	The Crowd	
29 June	"Frankie"	Sister Sledge	
6 July	"Frankie"	Sister Sledge	
13 July	"Frankie"	Sister Sledge	
20 July	"Frankie"	Sister Sledge	
27 July	"Axel F"	Harold Faltermeyer	
3 August	"There Must Be an Angel (Playing with My Heart)"	Eurythmics	
10 August	"Into the Groove"	Madonna	
17 August	"Into the Groove"	Madonna	
24 August	"Into the Groove"	Madonna	
31 August	"I Got You Babe"	UB40 with Chrissie Hynde	
7 September	"I Got You Babe"	UB40 with Chrissie Hynde	
14 September	"Dancing in the Street"	David Bowie and Mick Jagger	
21 September	"Dancing in the Street"	David Bowie and Mick Jagger	
28 September	"Holding Out for a Hero"	Bonnie Tyler	
5 October	"Part-Time Lover"	Stevie Wonder	
12 October	"If I Was"	Midge Ure	
19 October	"The Power of Love"	Jennifer Rush	
26 October	"The Power of Love"	Jennifer Rush	
2 November	"The Power of Love"	Jennifer Rush	
9 November	"The Power of Love"	Jennifer Rush	
16 November	"Nikita"	Elton John	
23 November	"A Good Heart"	Feargal Sharkey	
30 November	"A Good Heart"	Feargal Sharkey	
7 December	"I'm Your Man"	Wham!	
14 December	"Separate Lives"	Phil Collins and Marilyn Martin	
21 December	"Saving All My Love for You"	Whitney Houston	
28 December	"Thank You Very Much Mr. Eastwood"	Dermot Morgan	

- 26 Number Ones
- Most weeks at No.1 (song): "I Know Him so Well" - Elaine Paige and Barbara Dickson (5)
- Most weeks at No.1 (artist): Elaine Paige and Barbara Dickson (5)
- Most No.1s: Phil Collins (2 shared No.1s)
- NOTE: There were 4 Various Artist No. 1s this year (Band Aid, The Concerned, USA for Africa and The Crowd)

== See also ==
- 1985 in music
- Irish Singles Chart
- List of artists who reached number one in Ireland
