= The Wizard (Paul Hardcastle song) =

Single by Paul Hardcastle

from the album The Definitive Paul Hardcastle
- B-side: "The Wizard (Part 2)"
- Released: 1986
- Genre: Electro; synth-pop
- Length: 4:47
- Label: Chrysalis
- Songwriter: Paul Hardcastle
- Producer: Paul Hardcastle

Paul Hardcastle singles chronology
"Foolin' Yourself" (1986)	"The Wizard" (1986)	"Walk in the Night" (1988)

"The Wizard" is a song by British musician Paul Hardcastle, best known as the theme tune for the BBC's weekly music chart show Top of the Pops, which was used from 3 April 1986 to 26 September 1991. He was asked to write the song for the programme after the producers were impressed by his hit 1985 single "19". Later in 1986, the song was released as a single and charted at No. 15 in the UK charts, leading to Hardcastle also performing the song on the show. In Ireland, it was a top ten hit, peaking at No. 10.

== Track listing ==
UK 12" - "The Wizard (extended version)"
A. "Part 1" (extended version) - 4:47
B. "Part 2" (extended version) - 4:47

UK 12" - "The Wizard (jazz mix)"
A. "The Wizard" (jazz mix) - 4:22
B1. "Part 1" (extended version) - 4:47
B2. "Part 2" (extended version) - 4:47

UK 7"
A. "The Wizard (Part 1)" - 3:22
B. "The Wizard (Part 2)" - 3:48

== Charts ==
Chart (1986)	Peak position
Ireland (IRMA)	10
UK Singles (OCC)	15
West Germany (GfK)	51
