= Class of '61 =

- Genre: Drama; History; War
- Written by: Jonas McCord
- Directed by: Gregory Hoblit
- Starring: Dan Futterman; Clive Owen; Josh Lucas
- Theme music composer: John Debney
- Country of origin: United States
- Original language: English

Production
- Executive producers: Steven Spielberg; Jonas McCord
- Producer: Gregg Fienberg
- Production locations: Charleston, South Carolina; Mount Berry, Georgia
- Cinematography: Janusz Kamiński
- Editor: David Rosenbloom
- Running time: 90 minutes
- Production companies: Amblin Television; Universal Television

Original release
- Network: ABC
- Release: April 12, 1993

Class of '61 is a 1993 American war drama television film produced by Steven Spielberg as a projected television series about the American Civil War. It focused on men who were classmates at West Point and separated by the war between the North and the South. Filmed in Charleston, South Carolina and Atlanta, this work was the first collaboration between Spielberg and cinematographer Janusz Kamiński.

== Plot ==
The film follows the lives of several West Point classmates who fight on opposite sides of the American Civil War, which disrupts their previously close community.

The film also follows the adventures of Lucius, a slave who escapes via the Underground Railroad to freedom. The film cuts between the First Battle of Bull Run and the birth of Lucius' child into slavery.

== Cast ==
- Dan Futterman as Shelby Peyton
- Josh Lucas as George Armstrong Custer
- John P. Navin, Jr. as Burnett
- Clive Owen as Devin O'Neil
- Sophie Ward as Shannen O'Neil
- Laura Linney as Lily Magraw
- Andre Braugher as Lucius
- Barry Cullison as Sergeant Yancy
- Len Cariou as Dr Leland Peyton
- Dana Ivey as Mrs Julia Peyton
- Robert Newman as Captain Wykoff

== Production ==
Renowned Civil War historian Shelby Foote acted as consultant, and documentary producer Ken Burns was acknowledged for his contributions. He had created the critically acclaimed The Civil War documentary series in 1990.

This was the first collaboration between Spielberg and cinematographer Janusz Kamiński, whose work on Diane Keaton's Wildflower impressed Spielberg to hire him.
