= Memorial: Letters from American Soldiers =

1991 film

- Directed by: Bill Couturié
- Produced by: Bill Couturié; Bernard Edelman
- Edited by: Gary Weimberg
- Production company: Couturié Company
- Distributed by: HBO
- Release date: 1991
- Country: United States
- Language: English

Memorial: Letters from American Soldiers is a 1991 American short documentary film directed by Bill Couturié. It was nominated for an Academy Award for Best Documentary Short. It shows footage from World War I, World War II, the Korean War, the Vietnam War and the Gulf War, overlaid with readings of letters from US troops fighting in each war. The letters get read by Leo Downey, Robert Hegyes, Bill Irwin, Val Kilmer, James Naughton, Jim Tracy, Blair Underwood and Tom Hulce.
