= List of awards and nominations received by Janusz Kamiński =

Janusz Kamiński awards and nominations
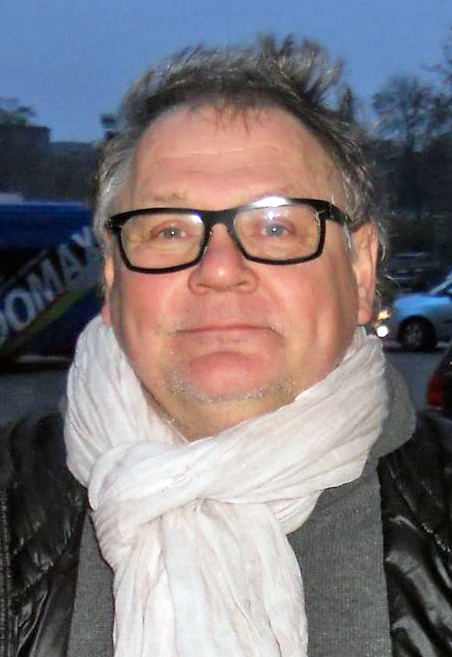
- Kaminski in 2014
Award	Wins	Nominations
Academy Awards	2	7
BAFTA Film Awards	1	5
ASC Awards	N/A	6
César Award	1	N/A
Independent Spirit Awards	1	N/A

Janusz Kamiński is a Polish cinematographer known for his work in film and television.

Kamiński is most known for his collaborations with director Steven Spielberg. Their partnership first started in 1993 with the holocaust drama Schindler's List for which Kamiński received his first Academy Award for Best Cinematography. He won his second for Spielberg's World War II drama Saving Private Ryan (1998). He has also received Academy Award nominations for Amistad (1997), War Horse (2011), Lincoln (2012), and West Side Story (2021).

He has received five British Academy Film Award nominations for Best Cinematography winning for Schindler's List (1993). He also has received five nominations from the American Society of Cinematographers for Outstanding Achievement in Cinematography. He did receive a special prize for his Cinematography for Julian Schnabel's The Diving Bell and the Butterfly (2007), as well as an Academy Award, César Award, and ASC Award nomination.

== Major associations ==
=== Academy Awards ===
Year	Category	Nominated work	Result	Ref.
1993	Best Cinematography	Schindler's List	Won	
1997	Best Cinematography	Amistad	Nominated	
1998	Best Cinematography	Saving Private Ryan	Won	
2007	Best Cinematography	The Diving Bell and the Butterfly	Nominated	
2011	Best Cinematography	War Horse	Nominated	
2012	Best Cinematography	Lincoln	Nominated	
2021	Best Cinematography	West Side Story	Nominated	

=== British Academy Film Awards ===
Year	Category	Nominated work	Result	Ref.
1993	Best Cinematography	Schindler's List	Won	
1998	Best Cinematography	Saving Private Ryan	Nominated	
2011	Best Cinematography	War Horse	Nominated	
2012	Best Cinematography	Lincoln	Nominated	
2015	Best Cinematography	Bridge of Spies	Nominated	

=== American Society of Cinematographers ===
Year	Category	Nominated work	Result
1993	Outstanding Achievement in Cinematography	Schindler's List	Nominated
1997	Outstanding Achievement in Cinematography	Amistad	Nominated
1998	Outstanding Achievement in Cinematography	Saving Private Ryan	Nominated
2007	Outstanding Achievement in Cinematography	The Diving Bell and the Butterfly	Nominated
2012	Outstanding Achievement in Cinematography	Lincoln	Nominated
2015	Outstanding Achievement in Cinematography	Bridge of Spies	Nominated

== Industry awards ==
=== American Film Institute (AFI) Awards ===
- 2002: A.I. Artificial Intelligence (won)
- 2010: Franklin J. Schaffner Award (won)

=== British Society of Cinematographers Award ===
For Best Cinematography:

- 1993: Schindler's List (won)
- 1998: Saving Private Ryan (nomination)
- 2007: The Diving Bell and the Butterfly (nomination)
- 2015: Bridge of Spies (nomination)

=== Camerimage ===
- 1998: Saving Private Ryan − Golden Frog (nominated)
- 2002: Atlas Award (won)
- 2007: The Diving Bell and the Butterfly − Golden Frog (won)

=== Cannes Film Festival ===
- 2007: The Diving Bell and the Butterfly − Vulcan Prize for the Technical Artist (won)

=== César Award for Best Cinematography ===
- 2007: The Diving Bell and the Butterfly (nomination)

=== Hollywood Film Awards ===
- 2002: Outstanding Achievement in Cinematography
- 2015: Bridge of Spies (won)

=== Independent Spirit Awards ===
Best Cinematography:

- 2007: The Diving Bell and the Butterfly (won)

=== Palm Springs International Film Festival ===
- 2000: Da Vinci's Cinematographer's Award (won)

=== Satellite Award for Best Cinematography ===
- 1997: Amistad (won)
- 1998: Saving Private Ryan (nomination)
- 2002: Minority Report (nomination)
- 2005: Munich (nomination)
- 2007: The Diving Bell and the Butterfly (won)
- 2011: War Horse (won)
- 2012: Lincoln (nomination)
- 2015: Bridge of Spies (nomination)

=== Stockholm International Film Festival ===
- 2007: The Diving Bell and the Butterfly (won)

== Critics awards ==
=== Alliance of Women Film Journalists ===
- 2002: A.I. Artificial Intelligence - Cinematographer of the Year (won)

Boston Society of Film Critics Award for Best Cinematography

- 1993: Schindler's List (won)
- 1998: Saving Private Ryan (won)
- 2007: The Diving Bell and the Butterfly (won)

=== Broadcast Film Critics Association ===
- 2011: War Horse (won) - Critics Choice Award for Best Cinematography
- 2012: Lincoln (nomination) - Critics Choice Award for Best Cinematography
- 2021: West Side Story (nomination) - Critics Choice Award for Best Cinematography

=== Chicago Film Critics Association ===
BEst Cinematography:

- 1993: Schindler's List (won)
- 1998: Saving Private Ryan (nomination)
- 2001: A.I. Artificial Intelligence (nomination)
- 2002: Minority Report (nomination)
- 2005: Munich (nomination)
- 2007: The Diving Bell and the Butterfly (nomination)
- 2011: War Horse (nomination)
- 2012: Lincoln (nomination)

=== Dallas–Fort Worth Film Critics Association ===
Best Cinematography:

- 1993: Schindler's List (won)
- 1998: Saving Private Ryan (won)

=== Florida Film Critics Circle ===
Best Cinematography:

- 1998: Saving Private Ryan (won)

=== Houston Film Critics Society ===
Houston Film Critics Society Award:

- 2011: War Horse (nomination)
- 2012: Lincoln (nomination)

=== IndieWire Critic's Poll ===
- 2007: The Diving Bell and the Butterfly (nomination) - Best Cinematography

=== Los Angeles Film Critics Association ===
Best Cinematography:

- 1993: Schindler's List (won)
- 1998: Saving Private Ryan (won)
- 2007: The Diving Bell and the Butterfly (won)

=== National Society of Film Critics Awards ===
Best Cinematography:

- 1993: Schindler's List (won)
- 1998: Saving Private Ryan (won)
- 2007: The Diving Bell and the Butterfly (won)

=== New York Film Critics Circle ===
Best Cinematography:

- 1993: Schindler's List (won)
- 2021: West Side Story (won)

=== St. Louis Film Critics Association ===
Best Cinematographer:

- 2007: The Diving Bell and the Butterfly (nomination)
- 2011: War Horse (nomination)

== Honours and recognition ==
- 2008: Golden Plate Award of the American Academy of Achievement presented by Awards Council member George Lucas
