= Dear America: Letters Home from Vietnam =

1987 American documentary film by Bill Couturié

- Directed by: Bill Couturié
- Written by: Bill Couturié; Richard Dewhurst
- Produced by: Bill Couturié; Thomas Bird; Bernard Edelman
- Starring: Tom Berenger; Ellen Burstyn; Sean Penn; Martin Sheen; Robin Williams; Willem Dafoe; Robert Downey Jr.
- Cinematography: Michael Chin
- Edited by: Stephen Stept; Gary Weimberg
- Music by: Todd Boekelheide
- Distributed by: HBO; Corsair Pictures
- Release date: October 1987
- Running time: 87 minutes
- Country: United States
- Language: English

Dear America: Letters Home from Vietnam is a 1987 American documentary film inspired by the anthology of the same title, directed by Bill Couturié. The film's narration consists of real letters written by American soldiers, which are read by actors, including Robert De Niro and Martin Sheen. The footage includes film from TV news, the U.S. Department of Defense and home movies by the soldiers.

== Plot ==
Using real letters written by American soldiers (which can be read in the book with many more) and archive footage, the film creates a personal experience of the Vietnam War.

== Cast ==
- Tom Berenger as (voice)
- Ellen Burstyn as Mrs. Stock (voice)
- J. Kenneth Campbell as (voice)
- Richard Chaves as (voice)
- Josh Cruze as (voice)
- Willem Dafoe as Elephant Grass (voice)
- Robert De Niro as Great Sewer (voice)
- Brian Dennehy as (voice)
- Kevin Dillon as Jack (voice)
- Matt Dillon as Mike (voice)
- Robert Downey Jr. as (voice)
- Michael J. Fox as Private First Class Raymond Griffiths (voice)
- Mark Harmon as (voice)
- John Heard as Johnny "Johnny Boy" (voice)
- Fred Hirz as (voice)
- Harvey Keitel as 2nd Lieutenant Donald Jacques (voice)
- Elizabeth McGovern as Me (voice)
- Judd Nelson as (voice)
- Sean Penn as (voice)
- Randy Quaid as Corporal Kevin Macaulay (voice)
- Timothy Patrick Quill as (voice) (credited as Tim Quill)
- Eric Roberts as (voice)
- Ray Robertson as (voice)
- Howard E. Rollins Jr. as (voice) (credited as Howard Rollins Jr.)
- John Savage as (voice)
- Raphael Sbarge as (voice)
- Martin Sheen as Alan (voice)
- Tucker Smallwood as (voice)
- Roger Steffens as (voice)
- Jim Tracy as (voice)
- Kathleen Turner as 1st Lieutenant Lynda Van Devanter (voice)
- Tico Wells as (voice)
- Robin Williams as Baby-San (voice)
- Denis Boileau as Recitant / The Narrator (voice)
- David Brinkley as Himself, NBC Newsman (archive footage)
- Fred DeBrine as Himself, NBC Newsman (archive footage)
- Alain Delon as Recitant / The Narrator (voice)
- Brigitte Fossey as Recitant / The Narrator (voice)
- Annie Giradot as Recitant / The Narrator (voice)
- Edgar Givry as Recitant / The Narrator (voice)
- Herve Icovic as Recitant / The Narrator (voice)
- Valerie Kaprisky as Recitant / The Narrator (voice)
- Jean-Pierre Leroux as Recitant / The Narrator (voice)
- Christophe Malavoy as Recitant / The Narrator (voice)
- Laurent Malet as Recitant / The Narrator (voice)
- Frank McGee as Himself, NBC Newsman (archive footage)
- Edwin Newman as Himself, NBC Newsman (archive footage)
- Florent Pagny as Recitant / The Narrator (voice)
- Jack Perkins as Himself, NBC Newsman (archive footage)
- Patrick Polvey as Recitant / The Narrator (voice)
- Howard Tuckner as Himself, NBC Newsman (archive footage)
- Sander Vanocur as Himself, NBC Newsman (archive footage)
- Bob Hope as Himself (archive footage) (uncredited)
- John Lennon as Himself (archive footage) (uncredited)
- Yoko Ono as Herself (archive footage) (uncredited)

== Reception ==
Both Gene Siskel of the Chicago Tribune and Roger Ebert of the Chicago Sun-Times gave the film strong recommendations. Ebert wrote in his review:

"This movie is so powerful precisely because it is so simple. The words are the words of the soldiers themselves, and the images are taken from their own home movies and from TV news footage of the war. There are moments here that cannot be forgotten, and most of them are due to the hard work of the filmmaker, director Bill Couturie, who has not taken just any words and any old footage, but precisely the right words to go with the images. Couturie began with an anthology of letters written home by U.S. soldiers in Vietnam. Then he screened the entire archive of TV news footage shot by NBC-TV from 1967 to 1969 - 2 million feet of film totaling 926 hours. He also gained access to footage from the Defense Department, including previously classified film of action under fire. Much of the footage in this film has never been seen publicly before, and watching it, you know why. What Couturie and his researchers have done is amazing. In many cases, they have matched up individual soldiers with their letters - we see them as we hear their words, and then we discover their fates."

== Accolades ==
The film won the 1988 Special Jury Prize: Documentary at the Sundance Film Festival and two Emmy Awards. It was also screened out of competition at the 1988 Cannes Film Festival.
