= Janusz Kamiński =

Polish cinematographer and filmmaker (born 1959)

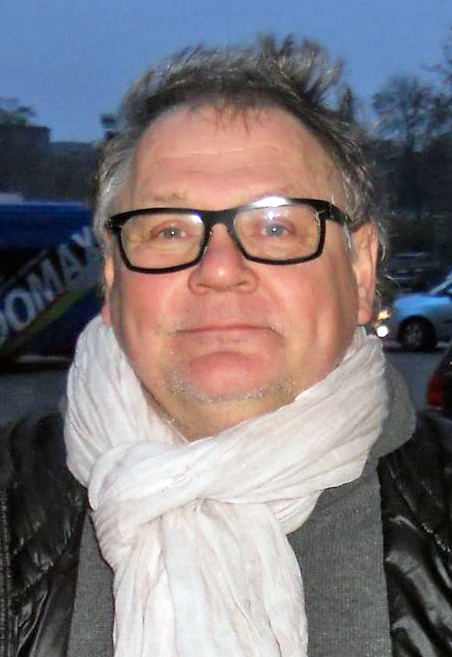
- Kamiński in 2014
- Born: Janusz Zygmunt Kamiński; June 27, 1959 (age 67); Ziębice, Lower Silesia, Poland
- Education: Columbia College Chicago (B.A., 1987); AFI Conservatory (M.F.A., 1987)
- Occupations: Cinematographer, film director, television director
- Years active: 1986–present
- Organization: American Film Institute
- Spouses: Holly Hunter (m. 1995; div. 2001) Rebecca Rankin (m. 2004; div. 2010)
- Awards: See full awards

Janusz Zygmunt Kamiński (Polish: [ˈjanuʂ kaˈmiɲskʲi]; born June 27, 1959) is a Polish cinematographer and director. He is best known for his long-term collaboration with Steven Spielberg, being his regular cinematographer since 1993.

Kamiński won the Academy Award for Best Cinematography twice, for Spielberg's Schindler's List (1993) and Saving Private Ryan (1998). In 2019, the American Society of Cinematographers included both movies on the list of the best-photographed films of the 20th century.

== Early life and education ==
Kamiński was born in Ziębice, son of Jadwiga Celner and Marian Kamiński. In 1981, he emigrated to the United States at the age of 21 after Prime Minister Jaruzelski imposed martial law.

He attended Columbia College in Chicago from 1982 to 1987, graduating with a Bachelor of Arts degree, taking up filmmaking as a profession before attending the AFI Conservatory, where he graduated with a Master of Fine Arts degree.

== Career ==
=== Cinematographer ===
Kamiński began his career at Roger Corman's Concorde Pictures. He worked under cinematographer Phedon Papamichael, first as a gaffer, and eventually as second unit director of photography.

Spielberg first discovered Kamiński in 1991, after seeing the television film Wildflower. Spielberg then hired Kamiński to shoot Class of '61, a television film in which Spielberg served as producer.

Kamiński won twice the Academy Award for Best Cinematography in the 1990s, for Schindler's List and Saving Private Ryan. He has been nominated five additional times throughout his career, with four of these movies being directed by Spielberg.

In 2010, he was awarded the Franklin J. Schaffner Alumni Medal by the AFI Conservatory.

Kamiński became a member of the American Society of Cinematographers (ASC) in 1994, but resigned in 2006.

=== Director ===
Aside from cinematography, Kamiński has also worked in the field of directing, first with the horror film Lost Souls (2000), and the NBC series The Event (2011) and WE TV series The Divide (2014).

In 2018, Kamiński worried that professional cinematographers were digitally losing control of their own images. In 2010, Kamiński abandoned the Chris Curling female fighter pilot World War II project The Night Witch, and in 2012, Kamiński discussed directing a Los Angeles-based version of the drama "XXXXXX" but nothing became of it.

== Personal life ==
Kamiński was married to actress Holly Hunter from 1995 until 2001.

In 2004, he married ABC reporter Rebecca Rankin; they divorced in 2010.

== Filmography ==
=== Director ===
Short film

- Making a Scene (2013)

Feature film

- Lost Souls (2000)
- Hania (2007)
- American Dream (2021)

Television

Year	Title	Episode
2011	The Event	"Face Off"
2014	The Divide	"Never Forget"

=== Cinematographer ===
Feature film

Year	Title	Director
1986	Lady America	Nick Gaitatjis
1989	Grim Prairie Tales	Wayne Coe
1990	The Rain Killer	Ken Stein
1990	The Terror Within II	Andrew Stevens
1991	Cool as Ice	David Kellogg
1991	Killer Instinct	David Tausik
1992	Pyrates	Noah Stern
1992	All the Love in the World	Daniel Curran
1992	Mad Dog Coll	Greydon Clark; Ken Stein
1993	Trouble Bound	Jeffrey Reiner
1993	The Adventures of Huck Finn	Stephen Sommers
1993	Schindler's List	Steven Spielberg
1994	Little Giants	Duwayne Dunham
1995	Tall Tale	Jeremiah S. Chechik
1995	How to Make an American Quilt	Jocelyn Moorhouse
1996	Jerry Maguire	Cameron Crowe
1997	The Lost World: Jurassic Park	Steven Spielberg
1997	Amistad	Steven Spielberg
1998	Saving Private Ryan	Steven Spielberg
2001	A.I. Artificial Intelligence	Steven Spielberg
2002	Minority Report	Steven Spielberg
2002	Catch Me If You Can	Steven Spielberg
2004	The Terminal	Steven Spielberg
2005	War of the Worlds	Steven Spielberg
2005	Munich	Steven Spielberg
2007	The Diving Bell and the Butterfly	Julian Schnabel
2007	Hania	Himself
2008	Indiana Jones and the Kingdom of the Crystal Skull	Steven Spielberg
2009	Funny People	Judd Apatow
2010	How Do You Know	James L. Brooks
2011	The Adventures of Tintin	Steven Spielberg
2011	War Horse	Steven Spielberg
2012	Lincoln	Steven Spielberg
2014	The Judge	David Dobkin
2015	Bridge of Spies	Steven Spielberg
2016	The BFG	Steven Spielberg
2017	The Post	Steven Spielberg
2018	Ready Player One	Steven Spielberg
2020	The Call of the Wild	Chris Sanders
2021	West Side Story	Steven Spielberg
2022	The Fabelmans	Steven Spielberg
2024	IF	John Krasinski
2026	Disclosure Day	Steven Spielberg
TBA	Petrichor	Marco Perego

TV movies

Year	Title	Director
1991	Wildflower	Diane Keaton
1993	Class of '61	Gregory Hoblit
2021	Oslo	Bartlett Sher

TV series

Year	Title	Director	Notes
2006	Wonder Pets!	Josh Selig	Episode "Save the Crane"
2014	The Divide	Tony Goldwyn	Episode "The Ways Men Divide"
2027	The Savant	Matthew Heineman	6 episodes

Music videos

Year	Title	Artist	Director
2026	"Hate That I Made You Love Me"	Ariana Grande	Christian Breslauer

== See also ==
- Cinema of Poland
- List of Polish Academy Award winners and nominees
- List of Poles
