= Don't Waste My Time (Paul Hardcastle song) =

Single by Paul Hardcastle

from the album Paul Hardcastle
- B-side: "Moonhopper"
- Released: 1985/1986
- Recorded: 1985
- Genre: Electro-funk; synth-pop
- Length: 5:36 (extended version); 3:48 (7" single)
- Label: Chrysalis
- Songwriter(s): Paul Hardcastle
- Producer(s): Paul Hardcastle

Paul Hardcastle singles chronology
"Just for Money" (1985)	"Don't Waste My Time" (1985)	"Foolin' Yourself" (1986)

"Don't Waste My Time" is a song by British musician Paul Hardcastle, released as the third and final single from his 1985 self-titled album. The song features lead vocals by Carol Kenyon. It was a top 20 hit in at least six countries, including the UK where it peaked at No. 8 in early 1986.

A 12" version, the 'Essential Well Hard Crucial Mix' features a cameo monologue by Lenny Henry's DJ character Delbert Wilkins.

The underlying tune was later sampled for the song La Chica de Humo by Emmanuel

== Charts ==
=== Weekly charts ===
Chart (1986)	Peak position
Australia Kent Music Report	66
Belgium (Ultratop 50 Flanders)	20
Ireland (IRMA)	15
Netherlands (Dutch Top 40)	11
Netherlands (Single Top 100)	12
New Zealand (Recorded Music NZ)	20
Switzerland (Schweizer Hitparade)	9
UK Singles (OCC)	8
US Billboard Hot Dance Club Play	31
West Germany (GfK)	15

=== Year-end charts ===
Chart (1986)	Position
Netherlands (Dutch Top 40)	93
Netherlands (Single Top 100)	82
