= Malice (1993 film) =

1993 film directed by Harold Becker

- Theatrical release poster
- Directed by: Harold Becker
- Screenplay by: Aaron Sorkin; Scott Frank
- Story by: Aaron Sorkin; Jonas McCord
- Produced by: Harold Becker; Charles Mulvehill; Rachel Pfeffer
- Starring: Alec Baldwin; Nicole Kidman; Bill Pullman; Bebe Neuwirth; Peter Gallagher; Josef Sommer; Anne Bancroft; George C. Scott
- Cinematography: Gordon Willis
- Edited by: David Bretherton
- Music by: Jerry Goldsmith
- Production companies: Castle Rock Entertainment; New Line Cinema
- Distributed by: Columbia Pictures
- Release date: October 1, 1993
- Running time: 107 minutes
- Country: United States
- Language: English
- Budget: $20 million
- Box office: $61 million

Malice is a 1993 American neo-noir film produced and directed by Harold Becker, written by Aaron Sorkin and Scott Frank from a story by Jonas McCord, and starring Alec Baldwin, Nicole Kidman, and Bill Pullman. Set in a small Massachusetts community, the plot follows a newlywed couple whose lives are upturned after they rent part of their home to a cavalier surgeon. Anne Bancroft, George C. Scott, Bebe Neuwirth, Peter Gallagher, and Tobin Bell appear in supporting roles.

Malice was released by Columbia Pictures on October 1, 1993. It received mixed reviews from critics but was a box office success, grossing $61 million worldwide on a budget of $20 million. It proved successful in the video rental market, becoming one of the top 20 rented films in the United States for 1994.

== Plot ==
In a Massachusetts college town, newlyweds Andy and Tracy Safian are having sex when they notice the young boy next door at his window, seemingly watching them. Andy is an associate dean at a women's college where a serial rapist is on the loose. When a student on campus is wounded by the rapist, Dr. Jed Hill, a newly arrived surgeon at the local hospital, operates and saves her life. Meeting Jed, Andy realizes they attended high school together. Money is tight, so Andy invites Jed, who is looking for an apartment, to rent the third floor of their Victorian home.

Andy finds the body of one of his students, murdered by the rapist. Interviewing Andy as a possible suspect, Detective Dana Harris requests a semen sample. While leaving the station, Andy learns Tracy has been hospitalized for abdominal pain and Jed is operating on her. While removing one of her ovaries, ruptured due to a cyst, Jed discovers Tracy is pregnant, but the surgery causes the fetus to abort. Another doctor notices Tracy's other ovary is torsed and appears necrotic. Rather than risk her life, Jed convinces Andy to agree to the removal of the second ovary, knowing Tracy will become infertile. Overruling the protests of other doctors that the other ovary might still be healthy, Jed removes it. On examination, the ovary is found healthy. Blaming Andy for his consent and her infertility, Tracy leaves him and sues Jed for malpractice.

During a deposition in which Jed is accused of having a God complex, he declares himself above reproach as a surgeon due to his ability to heal patients, asserting, "I am God". Tracy's lawyer, Dennis Riley, reveals that Jed was drinking before performing the operation. Fearful of negative publicity from a civil trial, the hospital and Jed's insurance company settle with Tracy for $20 million.

Andy discovers the serial rapist is Earl, a handyman at the college. After a struggle, he subdues Earl, who is arrested. In the aftermath, Dana informs Andy that his semen sample indicates he is sterile, thus he was not the father of Tracy's aborted child. When Andy accuses Dennis of having impregnated Tracy, Dennis asserts his innocence but refuses to break attorney-client privilege. Dennis suggests that Tracy's mother—who supposedly died twelve years previously—can answer his questions, advising Andy to take a bottle of Scotch to her.

Tracking down Tracy's mother, Andy finds a resentful alcoholic who reveals Tracy as a lifelong con artist and declares him an easy mark. Previously, Tracy had an affair with a wealthy man, who paid for her to have an abortion. Tracy began her career as a con woman by keeping the money and having the abortion at a clinic. She next took up with a "Dr. Lilienfield", who Andy eventually identifies as Jed. Jed and Tracy set Andy up so Jed could move into the house and inject her with pergonal, which causes ovarian cysts in overdose. Confronting Tracy, Andy demands half the settlement money. Pointedly, he tells her that his will directs the police to their ten-year-old next-door neighbor as a witness to her and Jed's crimes.

When Tracy asks Jed to murder the boy, he refuses to kill for her, telling Tracy to give Andy what he wants. He reasons that $10 million is enough for them. Jed blames Tracy's greed in getting pregnant to increase the settlement—not in the original plan—for exposing Andy's infertility. During their quarrel, Tracy shoots Jed dead. She then slips into the neighbor's house and attempts to suffocate the boy, only to find a dummy in his place. Enraged, Tracy attacks Andy after he walks in on her. Struggling, they fall down a stair landing from the second floor but survive. Dana arrests Tracy, revealing a sting operation to catch Tracy in the act of attempted murder. As she is led away in handcuffs, the boy and his mother return home, and Tracy realizes that he is blind. Andy leaves with Dana to have a drink of Scotch.

== Cast ==
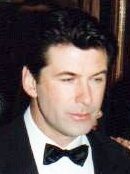
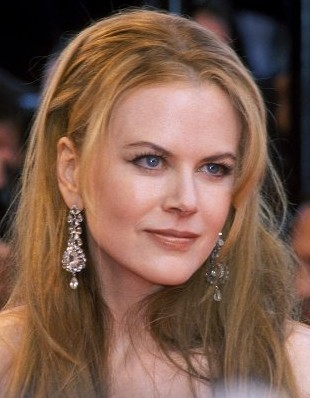
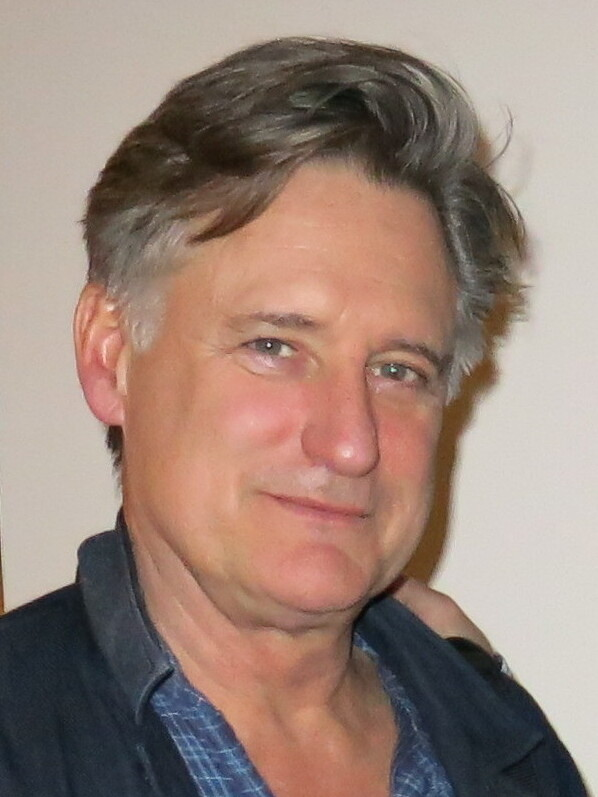
Leading trio Alec Baldwin, Nicole Kidman and Bill Pullman
- Alec Baldwin as Dr. Jed Hill
- Nicole Kidman as Tracy Safian
- Bill Pullman as Andy Safian
- Bebe Neuwirth as Det. Dana Harris
- Peter Gallagher as Dennis Riley
- Josef Sommer as Lester Adams
- Anne Bancroft as Mrs. Kennsinger
- George C. Scott as Dr. Martin Kessler
- Debrah Farentino as Nurse Tanya
- William Duff-Griffin as Dr. George Sullivan
- David Bowe as Dr. Matthew Robertson
- Tobin Bell as Earl Leemus
- Gwyneth Paltrow as Paula Bell
- Brenda Strong as Claudia
- Ann Cusack as Waitress
- Joshua Malina as Resident

== Production ==
=== Development ===
Malice had been in development at Castle Rock Entertainment since the company's founding in 1987 under the working title of Damages. Castle Rock eventually began readying Damages for production in 1989. Jonas McCord pitched an idea he had come up with after hearing a rumor around Beverly Hills about a woman and a surgeon who had conspired to defraud an insurance company by having the surgeon operate on her and carefully botch the procedure that would allow her to sue for $40 million and then split the money afterwards. Castle Rock bought McCord's pitch and worked on the script for a time, but after being unsatisfied with McCord's work Castle Rock fired him and began looking for a new writer.

Castle Rock attempted to hire William Goldman to draft a new script; he had previously written the studio's The Princess Bride and Misery. Because he was busy, Goldman instead suggested hiring a young new writer whom he would mentor—Aaron Sorkin. Sorkin contributed two drafts of the script before he had to work on the film adaptation of his play A Few Good Men. In November 1991, it was reported that Scott Frank was contributing to Damages, with many of the thriller elements in the final film attributed to Frank.

=== Casting ===
Following completion of A Few Good Men, Sorkin returned to provide rewrites which were instrumental in getting Alec Baldwin to agree to star. In April 1992, it was reported that Nicole Kidman had joined the cast. In July, Bill Pullman joined the cast.

Sorkin expressed his disappointment with the film in 2017, saying, "Early on in my career, I wrote a movie that I'm not very proud of at all, it just turned into a mess." He recounted how Harold Becker asked Sorkin to write a "steamy" sex scene between Baldwin and Kidman's characters, which he refused: "I said, 'Are you out of your mind?' First of all, I just did a movie with her husband [Tom Cruise]. And second of all, no, I'm not going to write down what I'd like to see Nicole do and then hand the pages out to the crew and Nicole." The scene was eventually created and filmed without the help of Sorkin.

In order to avoid confusion with the 1992 film Damage, the title Damages was dropped. Bodily Harm was briefly considered, before Malice was settled upon.

=== Filming ===
Principal photography occurred on location in Boston, Amherst, Holyoke, and Northampton in Massachusetts. Smith College was the setting used for the women's college.

Michael Hirsh and Patrick Loubert, co-founders of Canadian animation studio Nelvana, worked as executive producers on the film.

== Release ==
Malice had its world premiere in Los Angeles on September 29, 1993, and opened on 1,431 screens in the U.S. two days later, and grossed $9,232,650 during its opening weekend, ranking number 1 at the US box office. It eventually grossed a total of $46,405,336 in the U.S. and Canada and $15.2 million internationally for a worldwide total of $61.6 million,

== Critical reception ==
On Rotten Tomatoes, Malice holds a 54% approval rating based on 28 critic reviews. On Metacritic, the film has a weighted average score of 52/100 based on reviews from 17 critics, indicating "mixed or average" reviews. Audiences polled by CinemaScore gave the film an average grade of "B+" on an A+ to F scale.

Roger Ebert of the Chicago Sun-Times began his two-star review calling Malice "one of the busiest movies I've ever seen, a film jampacked with characters and incidents and blind alleys and red herrings. Offhand, this is the only movie I can recall in which an entire subplot about a serial killer is thrown in simply for atmosphere." Bemoaning the incoherent plot, Ebert added, "after the movie is over and you try to think through those secrets, you get into really deep molasses".

Peter Travers of Rolling Stone observed: "Goaded on by writer Aaron Sorkin, who could run a red-herring factory, the actors work to keep you guessing long after you've caught on. No one shows any shame about going over the top, especially Anne Bancroft in an Oscar-begging cameo as Tracy's mother. Perhaps director Harold Becker thought flashy acting could distract us from the gaping plot holes. Becker gets so intent on confusing us, he forgets to give us characters to care about . . . It's got suspense but no staying power." Vincent Canby of The New York Times wrote: "No matter how wild the plot reversals, there's always a slightly madder one to come."

Timothy M. Gray of Variety said: "The immaculately crafted Malice is a virtual scrapbook of elements borrowed from other suspense pix, but no less enjoyable for being so familiar. [It] should tickle audiences who want to be entertained without being challenged . . . After listless performances in such pics as Days of Thunder and Far and Away, Aussie Kidman, who here uses a flawless American accent, proves her strengths as an actress, and Baldwin mixes menace, sex and humor in another terrific performance."

In 2024, Far Out magazine named Jed one of the "10 most accurate movie psychopaths according to the FBI".

== Sources ==
- Booker, M. Keith (2025). American Noir Film: From The Maltese Falcon to Gone Girl. Lanham, Maryland: Rowman & Littlefield. ISBN 979-8-881-85505-5.
- Hardy, Phil (1997). The BFI Companion to Crime. University of California Press. ISBN 978-0-520-21538-2.
