= Last Light =

Last Light may refer to:

- Astronomical dusk, a time after sunset when the sky becomes completely dark
- Last Light (film), a 1993 TV film
- Last Light (novel), a 2001 novel by Andy McNab
- Last Light (album), a 2007 album by Matt Pond PA
- Last Light, a 2007 novel by Alex Scarrow
- Metro: Last Light, a 2013 video game by 4A Games
- Last Light, a 2022 TV drama series starring Matthew Fox

== See also ==
- First Light (disambiguation)
