= Ryan Farish =

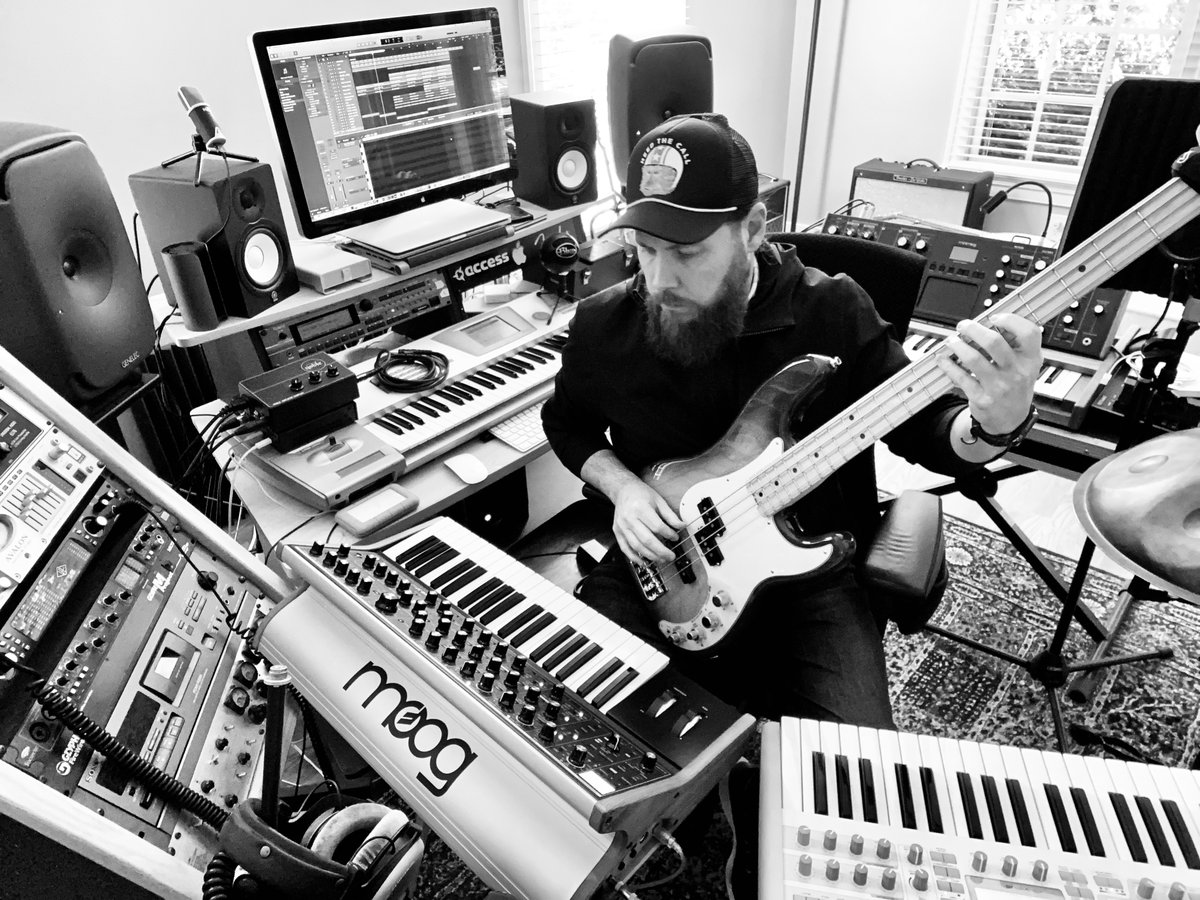
- Farish in the studio

Background information
- Origin: Norfolk, Virginia
- Genres: Electronic, chillout, downtempo, ambient, progressive trance, uplifting trance
- Occupations: Producer, DJ, composer, electronic musician, musician, pianist, songwriter, A&R, record label executive
- Instruments: Violin, piano, guitar, drums, synthesizer, bass guitar, drum machine, personal computer, percussion
- Years active: 2000–present
- Labels: RYTONE Entertainment, Black Hole Recordings
- Website: www.ryanfarish.com

Ryan Farish is an American composer, songwriter, producer, and multi-instrumentalist. He is known for his contributions to electronic music, mainly in the subgenres of downtempo electronica, chill-out, and dance music.

== Music career ==
Born in Norfolk, Virginia, Farish studied music business at UCLA.

In 2000, Farish's music was made available on MP3.com, a digital music platform. Following initial success, he released several studio albums, including Beautiful (2004) and From the Sky (2005), both of which charted on Billboard Magazine, reaching #10 & #3, respectively.

In 2008, Farish founded RYTONE Entertainment. His music has been featured on The Weather Channel's "Local on the 8s" segment and Storm Stories, where he composed the theme for their primetime show. Additionally, his compositions have been used by various media outlets, including Access Hollywood, the Discovery Channel, and FOX Sports.

Farish also co-wrote and co-published a Grammy Award-nominated recording at the 50th Grammy Awards in 2008, landing him a GMA Dove Award the same year for his work with the gospel group Trin-i-tee 5:7. His discography includes multiple albums that have charted on Billboard Magazine, such as Spectrum (2015), which debuted at #5 on the Best New Age Albums chart, and Wilderness (2018), which reached #2 on the Billboard Magazine chart. His music has received over 270 million streams across major digital platforms.

== Media ==
Throughout the 2000s and early 2010s, Farish's music was featured on The Weather Channel's "Local on the 8s", including the theme for Storm Stories.

In 2004, Farish coined the name "Positive Chillout" to describe his style of chillout electronic music. Later, in November 2006, he launched an internet radio station called "Positive Chillout" on Live365, as well as RyanFarish.com. In 2010, Farish relaunched the show on DI.FM's (Digitally Imported) "Chillout Dreams" channel as "Positive Chillout with Ryan Farish," focusing on electronic chillout music.

In January 2011, Farish debuted his progressive trance radio show Elevation on Hot 100.5 WVHT of Max Media. Elevation is a two-hour DJ mix set produced and hosted by Ryan Farish.

In December 2012, Google Play selected Ryan Farish as one of the Best Unsigned Artists of 2012, highlighting his album Life in Stereo.

In the summer of 2013, NBCUniversal/Universal Studios licensed Farish's song "Be Near" from his album Wonderfall (2008) for radio promotions for Despicable Me 2.

From November 26, 2013, to December 2, 2013, Farish's album Destiny was featured on Pandora Premieres.

In November 2014, Farish launched his "Positive Chillout" station on AccuRadio.

In 2015, Farish's 11th studio release, Spectrum (RYTONE/2015), debuted on Pandora Premieres and was awarded the "Hot Shot Debut" by Billboard Magazine, ranking #5 for Best Selling New Age Albums in the first week of sales.

== Endorsements ==
In late 2009, Ryan Farish signed an endorsement deal with Yamaha Corporation of America.

In 2011, Farish was featured by Audi USA in a series called "Remarkable Audi", which also featured his music. In November 2012, Farish was featured in a video titled "Bang & Olufsen Advanced Sound System for Audi" featuring Bang & Olufsen's design.

== Collaborations ==
In 2008, Farish collaborated with recording artist Donna Lewis on the single, "Dancing Angel".

Farish also co-wrote and co-published "Listen" from Trin-i-tee 5:7's album, T57, which was awarded a GMA Dove Award and a Grammy Award nomination.

On August 16, 2011, Farish's album Upon a Dream was released, including collaborations with Tiff Lacey, Aprille Goodman, Madelin Zero, and Dave Moisan.

On October 11, 2011, Farish and Paul Hardcastle announced Transcontinental, a collection of music featuring the vocals of Paul's daughter, Maxine Hardcastle, and son, Paul Hardcastle Jr. Transcontinental followed "Sunset Sky," which Farish digitally released on RYTONE Entertainment, featuring Paul Hardcastle Jr. on the saxophone mixed with Ryan's melodies. This collaboration between Ryan Farish and Paul Hardcastle began with the single release on June 22, 2010, titled "Reflections."

On November 3, 2017, Farish and BBMak singer Christian Burns collaborated on two songs for his album Primary Colors: "Find You" and "Safe in This Place."

Farish designed custom presets for Plugin Alliance's virtual synth Oberhausen, which was released in April 2019.

== Awards ==
- Farish won a GMA Dove Award at the 39th Annual GMA Awards (2007) for co-writing the gospel song "Listen" with Trin-i-Tee 5:7.
- Farish was a co-writer/co-publisher for a Grammy Award-nominated recording.
- In 2010, Farish was named as the first-appointed adviser by The Recording Academy Washington, D.C. Chapter Board, representing the VA Beach/Tidewater area.
- In 2011, Farish was elected as Governor by The Recording Academy Washington, D.C. Chapter Board.

== Credits ==
In 2004, Ryan Farish's album Beautiful peaked on the Billboard Charts at #10.

In 2005, Farish's album From the Sky peaked on the Billboard Charts at #3.

On November 19, 2013, Farish's single "Then Came the Sun" charted at #9 in the Sirius XM Electric Area Trance Top 20.

In 2015, Farish's 11th studio release, Spectrum, was awarded the "Hot Shot Debut" by Billboard Magazine, charting at position #5 for Best New Age Albums.

In 2017, Ryan Farish's album United peaked on the Billboard charts at #9.

On November 3, 2017, Ryan Farish released Primary Colors on Black Hole Recordings, which charted #17 on Billboard's Dance/Electronic Album Sales.

In 2018, Farish's album Wilderness debuted #1 on the iTunes and Amazon Top Electronic Album Charts and debuted on the Billboard Charts at #2. Ryan featured his own vocals on several tracks, including the self-titled track "Wilderness".

Ryan Farish's 15th album, Wonder, was released on March 22, 2019, and debuted at #14 on Billboard's Dance Electronic Album Sales chart.

== Discography ==
=== Studio albums ===
Year	Title	Notes
2004	Beautiful	
2005	From the Sky	
2006	Everlasting	
2008	Wonderfall	
2009	Beautiful (Deluxe Version) From the Sky (Deluxe Version) Everlasting (Deluxe Version) Spirit (A Ryan Farish Christmas) – EP Movement in Light	
2010	Bloom Opus	
2011	Opus Reloaded Upon a Dream Transcontinental EP with Paul Hardcastle	
2012	Main Room Architecture Life in Stereo	
2013	Destiny	
2015	Spectrum	
2017	United Primary Colors	
2018	Wilderness	
2019	Wonder Art for Life	
2020	Land of the Sky	
2021	Halcyon Rhythm of the Seasons	
2022	Solstice	
2023	Embers and Light Big Sky	
2024	Sky Dweller	
2025	Under the Stars	
2026	Heirloom - EP	
2026	Wild As the Wind	

=== Singles ===
Year	Title	Notes
2008	"Believe" "Pacific Wind – Sunday Morning Mix" "In This Moment"	
2009	"Clouds of Heaven" "Love Song" "L.A. Nights" "Storm Chaser"	
2010	"Iceland" "Come Into My World" "Perfect Clarity" "Reflections" "Depth of Love" "Sunset Sky"	
2012	"Light"	
2013	"Then Came the Sun"	
2014	"Love in the Air" "Home" "Distance (feat. Coury Palermo)"	
2016	"Skyline" "Stories in Motion" "Stories in Motion (Sied van Riel Away to the Past Remix)" "Stories in Motion (Sunny Lax Remix)"	
2017	"Stars Collide" "Stars Collide (Extended Mix)"	
2018	"Find You (Daniel Kandi Remix)"	
2022	"Warmth of the Sun" "Sea the Sky" "Breathe in This Moment" "Reverie"	
2023	"Skylight" "Here for You"	
2024	"Lose Myself"	

=== Remixes ===
- 2017 – Amnesia [Ryan Farish Remix] by Paul Oakenfold & Jordan Suckley on Perfecto Records Dreamstate, Vol. One (Bonus Track Version)

=== Live albums ===
- 2009 – Live at the National

=== Compilations ===
- 2002 – Selected Works
- 2003 – Selected Works Xpanded
- 2008 – Spa Relaxation
- 2009 – Rare & Remastered (2000–2002 Sessions)
- 2010 – Legacy (Greatest Hits 2000–2010)
- 2017 – Legacy: Greatest Hits, Vol.2

=== Independent albums ===
- 2000 – In the Day
- 2002 – Daydreamer

== See also ==
- List of ambient music artists
