= Rain Forest (Paul Hardcastle album) =

Studio album by Paul Hardcastle
- Released: 1985
- Genre: Electro, jazz
- Length: 42:43
- Label: Profile
- Producer: Paul Hardcastle

Paul Hardcastle chronology
Zero One (1985)	Rain Forest (1985)	Paul Hardcastle (1985)

Professional ratings
Review scores
Source	Rating
AllMusic	2/5 stars

Rain Forest is a studio album by artist Paul Hardcastle, released in 1985 on the Profile Records label. The album was nominated for Best R&B Instrumental Performance (Orchestra, Group or Soloist) in the 28th Annual Grammy Awards but lost to Musician by Ernie Watts.

== Track listing ==
Side 1
No.	Title	Length
1.	"Rain Forest" (Remix)	5:42
2.	"King Tut"	4:38
3.	"Panic"	4:29
4.	"Forest Fire"	7:30
Total length:		21:19

Side 2
No.	Title	Length
1.	"Loitering With Intent"	4:10
2.	"A.M."	5:14
3.	"Sound Chaser"	5:48
4.	"Rain Forest" (Original Mix)	5:12
Total length:		20:24

== Charts ==
Chart (1985)	Peak position
US Billboard 200	63
US Billboard R&B	30
