= Last Letters Home =

Last Letters Home: Voices of American Troops from the Battlefields of Iraq is a 2004-hour-long HBO documentary by Bill Couturié about U.S. soldiers killed in the Iraq War. The soldiers featured are:

- Capt. Josh Byers
- Sgt. Frank Carvill
- 2nd Lt. Leonard M. Cowherd
- PFC. Jesse Givens
- PFC. Raheen Heighter
- Capt. Pierre Piché
- PFC. Francisco (Pancho) Martinez-Flores
- Specialist Robert Wise
- Specialist Michelle Witmer
- PFC. Holly McGeogh
