= Sally Lutyens =

- Born: October 31, 1927
- Died: July 22, 2005 (aged 77)
- Occupations: Composer, Author, Librettist
- Notable work: First Light: An Oratorio, A Pocket Full of Wry (1995 C. E.), Auguste, The Light Princess

Sally Speare Lutyens (October 31, 1927 – July 22, 2005) was a composer, author, and librettist from Falmouth, Maine. She also resided in Portland and Manset, Maine, Weston, MA and Reading, PA.

Her works include First Light: An Oratorio (as composer and librettist), A Pocket Full of Wry (as author), Auguste (as composer and librettist), and The Light Princess (as composer and librettist). She studied piano with Claude Frank and taught music and piano at the Cambridge School of Weston, Weston, MA from 1967 to 1974.
