= Paul Hardcastle =

English musician and radio presenter

- Also known as: Deff Boyz
- Born: Paul Louis Hardcastle; 10 December 1957 (age 68)
- Origin: Kensington, London, England
- Genres: Synth-pop; freestyle; electronic; ambient; electro house; breakstep; smooth jazz; new age
- Occupations: Musician; producer; songwriter; radio presenter (in the U.S.)
- Instruments: Synthesizer; keyboards; piano; guitar; bass guitar; drums; percussion; programming
- Years active: 1981–present
- Labels: Chrysalis; Motown; V2; Profile; Trippin 'N' Rhythm
- Website: paulhardcastle.com

Paul Louis Hardcastle (born 10 December 1957) is an English composer, musician, record producer, songwriter, radio presenter and multi-instrumentalist. He is best known for his song "19", which went to number one on the UK singles chart in 1985.

== Early life ==
Born in Kensington, London, England, on 10 December 1957, Hardcastle is the son of Joyce (née Everett, 1930–1991) and Louis Hardcastle (1915–2000).

== Career ==
Hardcastle began his career in 1981 when he became the keyboard player for British soul band Direct Drive. In 1982, Hardcastle and lead vocalist Derek Green left the band to form a duo under the name First Light. They achieved some minor success in the UK chart, but the project was abandoned after two years and Hardcastle pursued a solo career.

Hardcastle achieved some success with his early singles, including the 1984 electro-funk/freestyle/instrumental track, "Rain Forest", which along with the track "Sound Chaser", reached number two on the dance chart. "Rain Forest" also hit number five on the soul chart and number 57 on the Billboard Hot 100. Rain Forest, the album both tracks were released on, was nominated for Best R&B Instrumental Performance (Orchestra, Group or Soloist) in the 28th Annual Grammy Awards. Musician by Ernie Watts would win the award that year.

Hardcastle is best known for the 1985 single "19", which went to No. 1 in the UK (for five weeks), as well as several other countries worldwide. It also reached number 15 in the U.S. Pop chart and number 1 in the U.S. Dance chart. The song received the Ivor Novello Award for Best-selling single of 1985. The follow-up single to "19" was "Just for Money", which reached No. 19 in the UK. It also charted in several other European countries.

In 1986, Hardcastle released a remix to "One Wish" by Hiroshima. In the same year, Hardcastle's "The Wizard" was adopted as the theme tune for the BBC's Top of the Pops weekly chart show. The theme tune was used from 3 April 1986 to 26 September 1991.

The song "Don't Waste My Time" became Hardcastle's second UK top ten in March 1986. It featured singer Carol Kenyon, a backing vocalist of Heaven 17. In late 1986, Hardcastle collaborated with the supergroup Disco Aid (later rebranded as Dance Aid in 1987) co-producing the charity single "Give Give Give".

In 1989, Hardcastle resumed working on First Light, collaborating with vocalist Kevin Henry, whom he had worked with on previous recordings.

Using his alias Deff Boyz, Hardcastle released the single "Swing" in 1990. It reached number 84 on the UK chart, number 27 in Germany, and number 18 in the US Dance chart.

Since the 1990s, Hardcastle has recorded several synth jazz albums, alternating releases under the pseudonyms Kiss the Sky (with Jaki Graham) and the Jazzmasters, as well as under his real name.

== Personal life ==
Hardcastle married Dolores Baker in 1985. They have three children, including British DJ and saxophonist Paul Hardcastle Jr. and singer Maxine Hardcastle, who both contributed vocals to Hardcastle's Transcontinental, a 2011 collection of new music recorded with Ryan Farish.

On 13 January 2026, Hardcastle announced the death of his son, Paul Hardcastle Jr., aged 35, in a road accident.

== Discography ==
=== Studio albums ===
Year	Title	Label	Peak chart positions				Certifications
Year	Title	Label	UK	US	US R&B	US Jazz	Certifications
1985	Zero One (with Universal Funk)	Bluebird/10 Records, EMI Music	—	—	—	—	
1985	Rain Forest	Profile Records	—	63	30	—	
1985	Paul Hardcastle	Chrysalis Records	53	—	—	—	BPI: Silver
1988	No Winners	Chrysalis Records	—	—	—	—	
1989	Sound Syndicate (also known as Are You Ready...)	AJK Music, K-Tel International	—	—	—	—	
1993	Time for Love	Fast Forward Records, JVC	—	—	—	—	
1994	Feel the Breeze	JVC	—	—	—	—	
1996	Look to the Future	JVC	—	—	—	—	
1996	Star of the Story	JVC	—	—	—	—	
1997	First Light	Connoisseur Collection	—	—	—	—	
2009	Zer01	Hardcastle Music	—	—	—	—	
2012	Perceptions of Pacha VIII (remixed by Nacho Marco)	Pacha Recordings	—	—	—	—	
2012	19 Below Zero	Hardcastle Music, Universal Music	—	—	—	—	
2014	Moovin & Groovin	Trippin 'N' Rythmn Records	—	—	—	7	
"—" denotes releases that did not chart or were not released in that territory.

=== Smooth jazz albums ===
==== Hardcastle series ====
Year	Title	Label	Peak chart positions		
Year	Title	Label	US	US R&B	US Jazz
1994	Hardcastle	Hardcastle Records, JVC, Trippin 'N' Rhythm Records	182	35	2
1996	Hardcastle II	Hardcastle Records, JVC, Trippin 'N' Rhythm Records	—	—	7
2002	Hardcastle III	Hardcastle Records, Trippin 'N' Rhythm Records	—	—	9
2005	Hardcastle 4	Hardcastle Records, Trippin 'N' Rhythm Records	—	—	2
2008	Hardcastle 5	Trippin 'N' Rhythm Records	176	—	5
2011	Hardcastle VI	Trippin 'N' Rhythm Records	—	—	4
2013	Hardcastle VII	Trippin 'N' Rhythm Records	—	—	3
2018	Hardcastle VIII	Trippin 'N' Rhythm Records	—	—	6
2020	Hardcastle IX	Trippin 'N' Rhythm Records	—	—	17
2022	Hardcastle X	Trippin 'N' Rhythm Records	—	—	14
"—" denotes releases that did not chart.

==== Jazzmasters series ====
Year	Title	Label	US Jazz
1993	The Jazzmasters	Fast Forward Records, Hardcastle Records, JVC, Trippin 'N' Rhythm Records	16
1995	The Jazzmasters II	Hardcastle Records, JVC, Trippin 'N' Rhythm Records	—
1999	The Jazzmasters III	Hardcastle Records, Trippin 'N' Rhythm Records	5
2004	The Jazzmasters 4	Hardcastle Records, Trippin 'N' Rhythm Records	—
2006	Jazzmasters V	Hardcastle Records, Trippin 'N' Rhythm Records	—
2010	Jazzmasters VI	Trippin 'N' Rhythm Records	—
2014	Jazzmasters VII	Trippin 'N' Rhythm Records	1
"—" denotes releases that did not chart.

==== Chill Lounge series ====
Year	Title	Label	US Jazz
2012	The Chill Lounge, Volume 1	Trippin 'N' Rhythm Records	12
2013	The Chill Lounge, Volume 2	Trippin 'N' Rhythm Records	10
2015	The Chill Lounge, Volume 3	Trippin 'N' Rhythm Records	11

==== Kiss the Sky with Jaki Graham ====
Year	Album	Label
1991	Kiss the Sky	JVC, Motown Records
1994	Millennium Skyway (also known as Kiss the Sky II)	Hardcastle Records, JVC

==== Transcontinental with Ryan Farish ====
Year	Album	Label
2011	Transcontinental (six-song EP)	Rytone Entertainment

=== Compilations ===
Year	Title	Label	US Jazz
1993	The Definitive Paul Hardcastle	Connoisseur Collection	—
1996	The Very Best (The Gold Collection)	EMI Music	—
1997	P.H. (Paul Hardcastle Works)	JVC	—
1997	Cover to Cover: A Musical Autobiography	Hardcastle Records, JVC, Trippin 'N' Rhythm Records	12
2000	Jazzmasters: The Greatest Hits	Hardcastle Records, Trippin 'N' Rhythm Records	5
2003	The Very Best of Paul Hardcastle 1983–2003	Jazz FM Records	—
2004	Jazzmasters: The Smooth Cuts	Hardcastle Records, Trippin 'N' Rhythm Records	17
2009	Paul Hardcastle: The Collection	Trippin 'N' Rhythm Records	8
2011	Desire: The Ultimate Seductive Album	Trippin 'N' Rhythm Records	6
2013	Electrofied 80s: Essential Paul Hardcastle	Music Club Deluxe (division of Demon Records)	—
2015	19: The 30th Anniversary Mixes	Nusic Sounds, Caroline International	—
2016	The History of Paul Hardcastle 1984–2016	Trippin 'N' Rhythm Records	—
2023	Nineteen and Beyond: 1984–1988	Chrysalis Records	—
"—" denotes releases that did not chart.

=== Singles ===
List of singles, with selected chart positions
Title	Year	Peak chart positions																Certifications	Album
Title	Year	UK	US	US Dance	US Jazz	US R&B	IRE	SWI	NOR	GER	NLD	SWE	ATR	ITL	FR	AUS	NZ	Certifications	Album
"You're the One for Me / Daybreak / A.M."	1984	41	—	—	—	—	—	—	—	—	—	—	—	—	—	—	—		The Definitive Paul Hardcastle
"Guilty"	1984	53	—	—	—	—	—	—	—	—	—	—	—	—	—	—	—		The Definitive Paul Hardcastle
"Eat Your Heart Out"	1984	59	—	—	—	—	—	—	—	—	—	—	—	—	—	—	—		Rain Forest
"King Tut"	1984	—	—	10	—	32	—	—	—	—	—	—	—	—	—	—	—		Rain Forest
"Rain Forest"	1985	41	57	2	—	5	—	—	—	—	—	—	—	—	—	—	—		Rain Forest
"19"	1985	1	15	1	—	8	1	1	1	1	1	1	1	1	15	10	1	BPI: Gold	Paul Hardcastle
"19 (German Version)"	1985	—	—	—	—	—	—	—	—	17	—	—	—	—	—	—	—		Paul Hardcastle
"Just for Money"	1985	19	—	—	—	—	15	27	—	31	—	—	—	—	—	—	—		Paul Hardcastle
"Don't Waste My Time"	1986	8	—	31	—	65	15	9	—	15	12	—	—	—	—	66	20		Paul Hardcastle
"Foolin' Yourself"	1986	51	—	—	—	—	—	—	—	—	—	—	—	—	—	—	—		The Definitive Paul Hardcastle
"The Wizard"	1986	15	—	—	—	—	10	—	—	51	—	—	—	—	—	—	—		The Definitive Paul Hardcastle
"Walk in the Night"	1988	54	—	—	—	—	—	—	—	—	—	—	—	—	—	—	—		No Winners
"40 Years"	1988	53	—	—	—	—	—	—	—	—	—	—	—	—	—	—	—		No Winners
"Are You Ready"	1989	90	—	—	—	—	—	—	—	—	—	—	—	—	—	—	—		Sound Syndicate
"Galaxy of Love"	1989	—	—	—	—	—	—	—	—	—	—	—	—	—	—	—	—		Sound Syndicate
"Serene"	2005	—	—	—	1	—	—	—	—	—	—	—	—	—	—	—	—		Hardcastle IV
"Marimba"	2008	—	—	—	3	—	—	—	—	—	—	—	—	—	—	—	—		Hardcastle V
"Lucky Star"	2008	—	—	—	1	—	—	—	—	—	—	—	—	—	—	—	—		Hardcastle V
"The Circle"	2009	—	—	—	8	—	—	—	—	—	—	—	—	—	—	—	—		Hardcastle VI
"Rain Forest" / "What's Going On"	2011	—	—	—	16	—	—	—	—	—	—	—	—	—	—	—	—		Hardcastle VI
"Easy Come, Easy Go"	2011	—	—	—	1	—	—	—	—	—	—	—	—	—	—	—	—		Hardcastle VI
"No Stress (At All)"	2013	—	—	—	1	—	—	—	—	—	—	—	—	—	—	—	—		Hardcastle VII
"Easy Street"	2013	—	—	—	2	—	—	—	—	—	—	—	—	—	—	—	—		Hardcastle VII
"Unlimited Love, Pt. 1"	2014	—	—	—	7	—	—	—	—	—	—	—	—	—	—	—	—		Moovin & Groovin
"Rhythm of Life"	2015	—	—	—	3	—	—	—	—	—	—	—	—	—	—	—	—		Jazzmasters VII
"Echoes Rising"	2016	—	—	—	1	—	—	—	—	—	—	—	—	—	—	—	—		The History of Paul Hardcastle
"Cut Loose"	2018	—	—	—	3	—	—	—	—	—	—	—	—	—	—	—	—		Hardcastle VIII
"Amber Skies"	2018	—	—	—	5	—	—	—	—	—	—	—	—	—	—	—	—		Hardcastle VIII
"Happy Go Lucky"	2019	—	—	—	1	—	—	—	—	—	—	—	—	—	—	—	—		Hardcastle VIII
"Dancing Galaxies"	2020	—	—	—	1	—	—	—	—	—	—	—	—	—	—	—	—		Hardcastle VIII
"Latitude"	2020	—	—	—	1	—	—	—	—	—	—	—	—	—	—	—	—		Hardcastle IX
"Welcome to the Beach"	2021	—	—	—	1	—	—	—	—	—	—	—	—	—	—	—	—		Hardcastle IX
"Tropicool"	2021	—	—	—	1	—	—	—	—	—	—	—	—	—	—	—	—		Hardcastle IX
"Wavelength"	2022	—	—	—	1	—	—	—	—	—	—	—	—	—	—	—	—		Hardcastle X
"—" denotes a recording that did not chart or was not released in that territory.

=== Unreleased promotional tracks ===
This is a list of several unreleased tracks that were made by Paul Hardcastle that were originally intended to have been used to promote the Lego Bionicle toyline in 2001.

These tracks were originally meant to have been included with the Bionicle Power Pack CD package that was later released in the same year.

Title	Year	Album	Label
Bionic Age (also referred to as the Bionicle Age)	2001	Extreme Global Hardcore	Warner Chappell Music (division of Warner Music Group)
Killing Machines (also known as the original full version of The Bionicle Music track that was cut following the final release of the CD & later uses in commercials for the toyline)	2001	Extreme Global Hardcore	Warner Chappell Music (division of Warner Music Group)

== See also ==
- List of number-one dance hits (United States)
- List of artists who reached number one on the US Dance chart
- List of 1980s one-hit wonders in the United States
- List of performers on Top of the Pops
- List of smooth jazz performers
- List of synthpop artists
- List of artists who reached number one on the UK Singles Chart
