= First Light (band) =

English funk musical group

- Origin: London, England
- Genres: Post-disco, electro, jazz-funk, soul
- Years active: 1982–1984, 1989–1990
- Labels: Oval, London, Sgt. Peppers
- Past members: Paul Hardcastle; Derek Green; Kevin Henry

First Light was an English funk project of Paul Hardcastle.

== Overview ==
Paul Hardcastle and Derek Green were originally members of the Brit funk band Direct Drive, however at the end of 1982, they decided to leave the band and become a duo. Following their formation, they released the single "Don't Be Mistaken". In early 1983, they released their eponymous debut album which featured the song "Explain the Reasons". It reached No. 65 in the UK Singles Chart the same year. The follow-up single was "Wish You Were Here"; which peaked at No. 71 on the same chart.

After the release of their second and last album Daybreak in 1984, Hardcastle and Green parted ways. Green moved to other projects and Hardcastle pursued a solo career.

In 1989, Hardcastle resumed working on First Light. This time he worked with Kevin Henry who had previously provided vocals on his solo work. Produced and arranged entirely by Hardcastle, the new album You Had It All was issued on the Sgt. Peppers record label. Four subsequent singles from the album were released.

In 2010, Hardcastle released a jazz album under the name First Light called East to West.

== Discography ==
=== Albums ===
- First Light (1983)
- Daybreak (1984)
- You Had It All (1989)
- East to West (2010)

=== Compilations ===
- Time Machine – The Best of Direct Drive & First Light 1981–82 (2001)

=== Singles ===
Year	Song	UK
1982	"Don't Be Mistaken"	—
1982	"16 Minutes of 1st Light"	—
1983	"Explain the Reasons"	65
1984	"Wish You Were Here"	71
1989	"Loving You"	—
1989	"You Had It All"	—
1990	"So Easy"	—
1990	"Right or Wrong"	―
"—" denotes releases that did not chart.
