= First Light: An Oratorio =

2005 musical work by Sally Lutyens

- by Sally Lutyens
- Year: 2005
- Style: Modern
- Form: Oratorio

First Light: An Oratorio is a 2005 oratorio by composer Sally Lutyens. The words are from the book First Light: Acadia National Park and Maine's Mount Desert Island, by Charles R. Tyson, Jr. It was composed with the intention of being a multimedia performance to be shown with photographs by Tom Blagden, Jr. It was first performed at St Saviour's Church in Bar Harbor, Maine on 27 and 28 August 2005. This performance was recorded and sold as CDs, and as DVDs, which included the slideshow.
