= Vietnam Requiem =

1982 American television documentary program

Vietnam Requiem is a 1982 ABC News Closeup television documentary directed by Bill Couturié and Jonas McCord and photographed by Ted Haimes.

== Summary ==
It is about the post-traumatic stress disorder suffered by veterans. The film comprises interviews with five Vietnam War veterans then in prison for crimes committed after discharge, inter-cut with news footage from the time of the war, with narration by Peter Thomas.

== Release ==
After its television broadcast, it was released to educational institutions by Direct Cinema Limited.

== Awards and nominations ==
- 1982, winner of a News & Documentary Emmy Award for Special Classification for Outstanding Program Achievement - Program
  - nominated for three News & Documentary Emmy Award for Outstanding Achievement in a Craft in News and Documentary Programming: Cinematography for Ted Haimes, Editing for Stephen Stept, and Ken Melville and Dawn Atkinson for Music Composing
- 1982 winner of a Peabody Award for ABC.
- 1983 winner of the Golden Nymph Award at the Monte-Carlo Television Festival.
- 1983 winner of the CINE Golden Eagle - Television Documentary/Short Subject

== See also ==
- 19 (song)
