= Wildflower (1991 film) =

1991 American television film

- DVD cover
- Based on: Alice by Sara Flanigan
- Screenplay by: Sara Flanigan
- Directed by: Diane Keaton
- Starring: Beau Bridges; Patricia Arquette
- Country of origin: United States
- Original language: English

Production
- Cinematography: Janusz Kamiński
- Running time: 94 minutes
- Production companies: Freed-Laufer Productions; Carroll Newman Productions; The Polone Company; Hearst Entertainment

Original release
- Network: Lifetime Television
- Release: December 3, 1991

Wildflower is a 1991 television film directed by Diane Keaton and based on Sara Flanigan's book Alice. It stars Beau Bridges, Susan Blakely, Patricia Arquette, William McNamara and Reese Witherspoon.

== Plot ==
In a small town in 1938, adolescent Sammy Perkins and his sibling Ellie find Alice alone in an unheated shack, where her stepfather had forced her to live because of her hearing problems and epileptic seizures. Alice's mother Ada had agreed to marry her 2nd husband before he became abusive.

Sammy and Ellie quickly grow close to Alice despite their father's concerns over the known cruelty of Alice’s stepfather. Together, they garner assistance for Alice from their grandmother who becomes Alice’s teacher and from the town's doctor, who manages to acquire a hearing aid along with medicine that substantially reduces the number and severity of Alice’s epileptic seizures.

== Cast ==
- Beau Bridges as Jack Perkins
- Susan Blakely as Ada Guthrie
- William McNamara as Sammy Perkins
- Reese Witherspoon as Ellie Perkins
- Patricia Arquette as Alice Guthrie
- Bessie Morgan as Collin Wilcox
