= Carol Kenyon =

British singer and musician (born 1959)

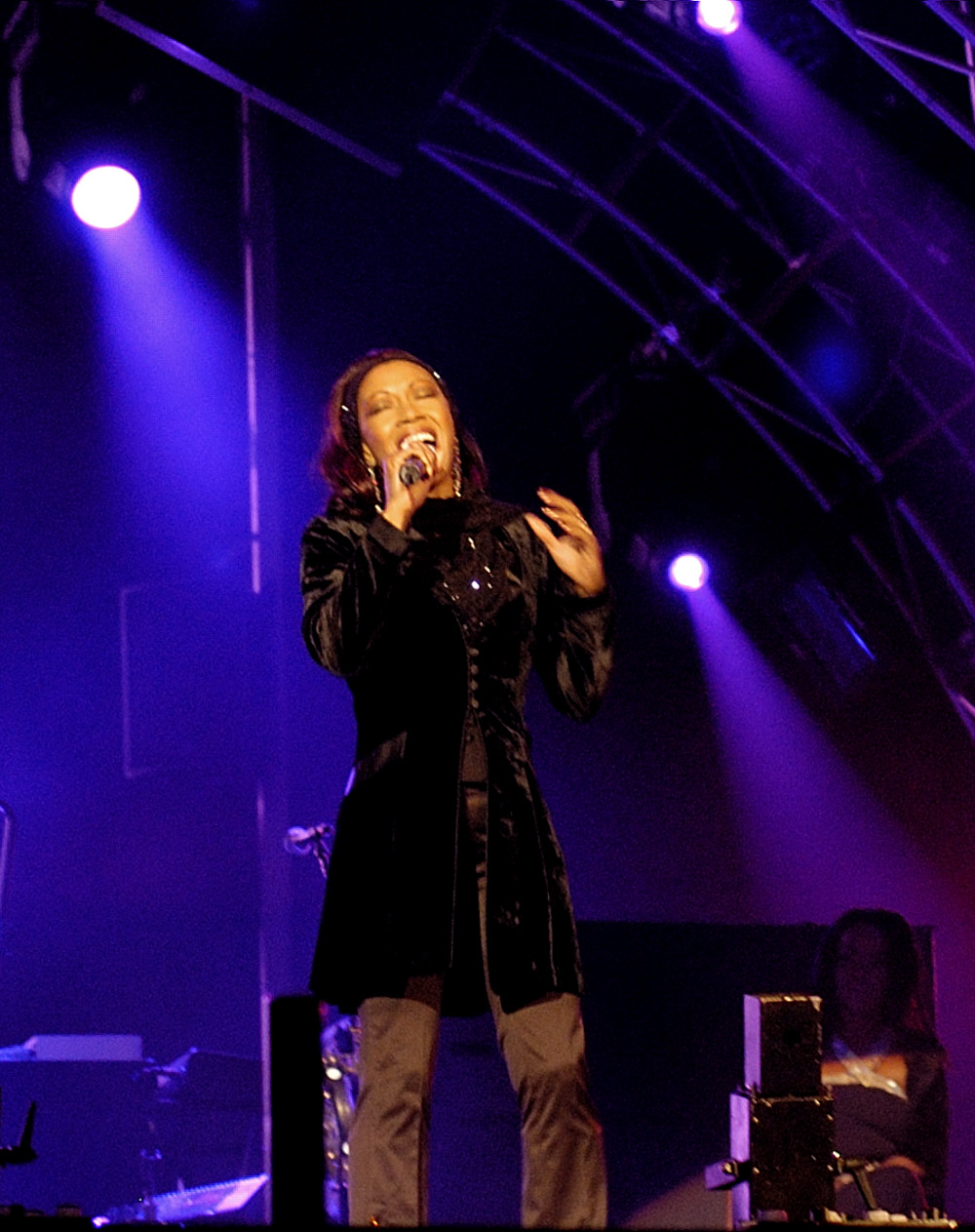
- Kenyon on Roger Waters' Dark Side of the Moon Live world tour, Roskilde Festival 2006, Denmark

Background information
- Also known as: Karol Kenyon
- Born: 1959 (age 66–67)
- Origin: United Kingdom
- Occupation: Singer
- Instrument: Vocals
- Label: A&M

Carol Kenyon (sometimes spelt Karol; born 1959) is a British singer. She is best known for her vocals on the Heaven 17 hit song "Temptation", which reached number two in the UK Singles Chart in 1983. When the song was re-released as a remix by Brothers in Rhythm in 1992, again featuring Carol's vocals, it made number 4. She was also featured on the Paul Hardcastle hit "Don't Waste My Time", which got to number 8 in 1986. She also recorded the songs "Warrior Woman", "Dance with Me" and "Fascinating".

== Background ==
=== Early life ===
When Kenyon was a child, she was encouraged to sing and dance. She took lessons and entered arts festival contests. She played piano. She enjoyed listening to the collection of jazz records her father had.

While she was singing with a school choir at a music festival in Harrow, London, a young musician also appearing there, Guy Barker, heard her and encouraged her to work more seriously on singing.

Eventually Barker encouraged her to attend an National Youth Jazz Orchestra (NYJO) engagement. There, after hearing her sing, NYJO took her on, as its first regular band singer. She was only 14.

=== Further on ===
Her early performances were as part of the National Youth Jazz Orchestra. She has also sung with Go West, Duran Duran, Kylie Minogue, Mike Oldfield, Jon and Vangelis, Pet Shop Boys, Gary Moore, Dexys Midnight Runners, Pink Floyd, Tommy Shaw, Roger Waters, Morrissey–Mullen, Tears for Fears, Rapino Brothers, Paul Hardcastle, Ultravox and Van Morrison. In 1993, Kenyon appeared with David Suchet in Agatha Christie's Poirot novella Yellow Iris.

== Career ==
Although primarily known as a session vocalist on many albums and singles by a variety of prominent artists, as well as in many concerts, Kenyon has also released several singles as a solo artist. Her first single was "Warrior Woman" which was released on A&M Records in 1984.

Kenyon recorded the song "Dance with Me" which was released in 1984. It was reviewed in the 19 May issue of Music Week. Calling it a passable song with great vocals that's soulfully sung, the reviewer also noted the reinforcing of the chorus from the multi-tracked backing vocals, the bubbling bass and rolling drums pinning the beat down. It would spend a week in the UK charts, peaking at no. 87.

Kenyon recorded the song "Fascinating" which was composed by herself, Luke Tunney and Rod Gammons. It was released in Germany on CBS CBS 654707 6 in 1989. It was noted in the 6 May 1989 issue of Music & Media that the song was added to the playlist of radio NDR in Hamburg, Germany. In Sweden, it was also added to the playlists of Hit FM in Stockholm and Radio City 103 in Gothenburg for the week of 27 May. Also on that week it was added to the playlist of Radio Roskilde in Roskilde, Denmark. Its addition to the playlist of Radio Herning in Denmark was noted in the 19 June issue of Music & Media.

== Career highlights ==
- 1981: Sang the winning song at the Castlebar Song Contest "I Wasn't Born Yesterday" written by Miki Antony & Robin Smith
- 1981: Backing vocals on the Jon & Vangelis album The Friends of Mr Cairo
- 1982: Backing vocals on the Chris Rea self-titled album
- 1982: Vocals on the Morrissey–Mullen album Life on the Wire
- 1982: Vocals on the Dexys Midnight Runners album Too-Rye-Ay
- 1983: Vocals on the Heaven 17 single "Temptation" (UK #2)
- 1984: Duet vocals on the Tommy Shaw album Girls with Guns on the track Outside in the Rain
- 1984: Backing vocals on the Vangelis/Demis Roussos album Reflection
- 1984: Backing vocals on the Van Morrison live album Live at the Grand Opera House Belfast
- 1984: Lead vocals on the Malcolm McLaren single Madame Butterfly from the album Fans
- 1986: Lead vocals on the Paul Hardcastle single "Don't Waste My Time" (UK #8)
- 1986: Additional vocals on the album Into the Light by Chris de Burgh
- 1986: Backing vocals on the Nik Kershaw album Radio Musicola
- 1986: Backing vocals on the Ultravox songs Same Old Story and The Prize
- 1986: Backing vocals on Robbie Nevil by Robbie Nevil
- 1986: Backing vocals on Trouble in Paradise by Anri
- 1988: Vocals on the album My Nation Underground by Julian Cope
- 1988: Backing vocals on Anderson Bruford Wakeman Howe self-titled album
- 1989: Lead vocals on the Mike Oldfield single "Nothing But" on the album Earth Moving
- 1989: Backing vocals on the album The Seeds of Love by Tears for Fears
- 1989: Backing vocals on the album Vigil in a Wilderness of Mirrors by Fish
- 1989: Backing vocals on the album Results by Liza Minnelli
- 1989: Backing vocals on the album Donny Osmond by Donny Osmond on the track Sacred Emotion
- 1989: Backing vocals on the album Swamp by Phil Thornalley
- 1989: Backing vocals on the album Avalon Sunset by Van Morrison
- 1990: Backing vocals on the album Peace of Mind by Breathe
- 1990: Backing vocals on the album Naked Thunder by Ian Gillan
- 1990: Backing vocals on the album In ogni senso by Eros Ramazzotti
- 1990: Backing vocals on the album Circle of One by Oleta Adams
- 1990: Backing vocals on the album Liberty by Duran Duran
- 1990: Additional vocals on the album Behaviour by Pet Shop Boys
- 1991: Backing vocals on the album Real Life by Simple Minds
- 1991: Backing vocals on the album No Place Like Home by Big Country
- 1991: Backing vocals on the album Hymns to the Silence by Van Morrison
- 1991: Backing vocals on the album Let's Get to It by Kylie Minogue
- 1991: Backing vocals on the album Free by Rick Astley
- 1991: Backing vocals on the album Auberge by Chris Rea
- 1992: Backing vocals on the album After Hours by Gary Moore
- 1994: Backing vocals on the album The Division Bell by Pink Floyd
- 1995: Backing vocals on the album Alternative by Pet Shop Boys
- 1996: Backing vocals on the album Soft Vengeance by Manfred Mann's Earth Band
- 1996: Backing vocals on the album Universal by Orchestral Manoeuvres in the Dark
- 1997: Backing vocals on the album The Big Picture by Elton John
- 1998: Backing vocals on the album Songs of Praise by Bullyrag
- 1999: Backing vocals on the album Nightlife by Pet Shop Boys
- 2001: Backing vocals on David Gilmour concert at Meltdown festival and corresponding David Gilmour in Concert DVD
- 2002: Backing vocals on Roger Waters' In the Flesh tour
- 2005: With Pink Floyd at the Live 8 concert, London in Hyde Park
- 2006–2008: Backing and lead vocals on Roger Waters' Dark Side of the Moon Live world tour (including his appearance at Live Earth 7 July 2007, Giants Stadium, East Rutherford, NJ)

== Discography ==
Year	Title	Label	UK
1984	"Warrior Woman"	A&M	91
1984	"Dance with Me"	A&M	87
1987	"Give Me One Good Reason"	Chrysalis	—
1988	"Fascinating"	CBS	—
1990	"Never Let Me Go"	CBS	—
1993	"Here's My A" (Rapination featuring Carol Kenyon)	Logic/BMG	69
"—" denotes releases that did not chart.
