= Jonas McCord =

American film director and screenwriter (born 1952)

- Born: June 13, 1952 (age 73); Washington, D.C., U.S.
- Occupations: Screenwriter, film director, producer
- Years active: 1979–present

Jonas McCord (born June 13, 1952) is an American screenwriter, director, and producer.

== Films ==
Year	Title	Director	Writer	Producer	Notes
1982	Vietnam Requiem	Yes	Yes	Yes	Documentary
1986	Women of Valor		Yes	Yes	TV movie
1993	Class of '61		Yes	Yes	TV movie
1993	Malice		Yes		Story writer
2001	The Body	Yes	Yes		
2003	The Company			Yes	
2004	Eulogy			Yes	
2005	Havoc			Yes	
2006	Ask the Dust			Yes	
2014	God the Father			Yes	Documentary
2024	Reagan		Yes		

== Television ==
Year	Title	Director	Writer	Producer	Notes
1988	The Dirty Dozen		Yes	Yes	Wrote 1 episode, executive produced 7 episodes
1989–1991	The Young Riders		Yes	Yes	Wrote teleplay for 1 episode, executive produced 34 episodes
1994	Tales from the Crypt	Yes			Episode: "Revenge Is the Nuts"
1998–1999	Earth: Final Conflict		Yes	Yes	Wrote 1 episode, executive produced 12 episodes
