= Bill Couturié =

American film director

William Couturié is a film director and producer, best known for his work in the field of documentary film.

== Accolades ==
He won the 1989 Academy Award for the AIDS documentary Common Threads: Stories from the Quilt that he produced with Rob Epstein and multiple Emmy Awards for his 1987 film Dear America: Letters Home from Vietnam, which he wrote, produced, and directed.

== Other works ==
Couturié was an early collaborator of filmmaker John Korty, working on his 1983 animated feature, Twice Upon a Time alongside George Lucas. His sole video game credit is serving as a producer on the Laserdisc arcade game Freedom Fighter, of which Charles Swenson and Ken Melville of Twice Upon a Time were also involved. More recently he co-produced and directed the film Guru of Go, a documentary for the ESPN 30 for 30 series about Paul Westhead' s unorthodox fast break basketball offense at Loyola Marymount University called "The System" featuring Gregory "Bo" Kimble and Hank Gathers.

== Filmography ==
- Can't It Be Anyone Else (1980); producer
- Porklips Now (1980): producer
- Twice Upon a Time (1983); producer and writer
- Vietnam Requiem (1984); director and producer
- Dear America: Letters Home from Vietnam (1987); director, producer and writer
- Freedom Fighter (Laserdisc arcade game) (1987); producer
- Common Threads: Stories from the Quilt (1989); producer
- Memorial: Letters from American Soldiers (1991); director and producer
- Earth and the American Dream (FI) (1992); director, producer and writer
- Loyalty & Betrayal: The Story of the American Mob (1994); executive producer
- Ed (1996); director and executive producer
- A Place at the Table (2001); executive producer
- Mighty Times: The Legacy of Rosa Parks (2002); executive producer
- The West Wing Documentary Special (2002); director and writer
- Last Letters Home: Voices of American Troops from the Battlefields of Iraq (2004); director and producer
- Into the Fire (2005); director and writer
- Boffo! Tinseltown's Bombs and Blockbusters (2006); director, producer and writer
- The Alzheimer's Project (2009); director and producer (1 episode)
- Guru of Go (2010); director and producer (featured on 30 for 30)
- Thumbs (2011); director
