= At First Light (film) =

- Directed by: Jason Stone
- Written by: Jason Stone
- Produced by: Chris Ferguson; Michael Baker
- Starring: Stefanie Scott; Théodore Pellerin
- Cinematography: David Robert Jones
- Edited by: Greg Ng
- Music by: Edo Van Breemen
- Production companies: Oddfellows; Bunk 11 Pictures
- Distributed by: Gravitas Ventures
- Release date: 2018 (South by Southwest)
- Running time: 91 minutes
- Country: Canada
- Language: English

At First Light (also titled First Light) is a 2018 Canadian science fiction thriller drama film written and directed by Jason Stone and starring Stefanie Scott and Théodore Pellerin.

== Plot ==
A high school senior, Alex, encounters mysterious lights, and she gets amazing, supernatural abilities but no memory of who she is or how she got the powers. Her friend Sean finds her and offers to take her into his home until she recovers. A dubious organization tracks her down, and the two are forced to run away, and have to try and find out the truth of what actually happened that night.

17-year-old Sean takes care of his catatonic grandmother and little brother. He goes to a party and reconnects with an old friend & crush, Alex. Alex leaves the party with her boyfriend to go night swimming, where she drowns. While underwater, mysterious lights light the sky and water around her. She is later seen walking down the road, confused and with no memories. She calls Sean, who had written his number on her arm at the party.

He picks her up and lets her sleep at his place, assuming she is on drugs and needs to sleep them off. However, the next day strange things start to happen around Alex: lights flickering, knives hovering in midair, and Sean’s catatonic grandma suddenly lively and back to normal. Sean takes Alex home as her step-mom has reported her missing, but while there Alex pushes Sean out of the second story window- stopping them both seconds before hitting the ground with her new strange powers.

Now on the run, the pair meet an ex-scientist, Cal, who has tracked down Alex through the electromagnetic energy she puts off. Warning them that others are searching for her, Alex and Sean go with him. He explains that his organization has been sending out messages into spaces for years- and “they” have finally responded. He also warns Sean that his close proximity to Alex is giving him radiation poisoning and will eventually kill him. Seeing the pain she’s causing Sean, Alex flees to the desert where the giant circle of solar panels are located.

As Sean’s condition worsens, he sets out after her. Cal’s former organization comes to his home asking questions about Alex. They realize that she is unique, as the others like her have not lived longer than 6 hours and she has now been stable for more than 24. Sean catches Alex getting on a bus and kisses her, convincing her to let him come with her. Their bus is stopped and searched by people with electromagnetic detectors who take them to the circle like messages in the desert. Sean’s health worsens further while Alex is sedated and examined. The leader of the organization explains to Sean that “they” have chosen Alex as a means of communicating with Earth, possibly attempting to integrate with humanity. Alex dreams of the lights that saved her life and of her childhood memories, affecting the lights and magnetic items in the entire facility, and then flatlines. Sean, now extremely weak, finds her and his voice brings her back to life. A scientist chases them outside, where Alex takes control of the thousands of solar panels in the circle- communicating with “them” and lights begin to arrive. Alex surrounds Sean in light, healing him and then saying “Let her go. We’re here, it’ll get better now” and disappearing. More lights arrive and spread across Earth. 3 months later Sean and his brother are doing well, though the organization is still keeping an eye on Sean. Lights fill the sky, “they” are finally here.

== Cast ==
- Stefanie Scott as Alex Lainey
- Théodore Pellerin as Sean
- Saïd Taghmaoui as Cal
- James Wotherspoon as Tom
- Percy Hynes White as Oscar
- Jahmil French as Nathan
- Kate Burton as Kate

== Release ==
The film premiered at South by Southwest in 2018. In August that year, it was announced that Gravitas Ventures acquired distribution rights to the film in the U.S., Australia and New Zealand. The film was released in theaters and on demand on September 28, 2018.

== Reception ==
On the review aggregator website Rotten Tomatoes, 50% of 14 critics' reviews are positive. Metacritic, which uses a weighted average, assigned the film a score of 49 out of 100, based on 5 critics, indicating "mixed or average" reviews.

Chris Knight of the National Post gave the film a negative review and wrote, "The actors are fine, though the drab screenplay does them no favours." Kevin Crust of the Los Angeles Times gave the film a positive review and wrote, "Pellerin and Scott are such deeply compelling performers that you are likely to forgive the familiarity of the lovers-on-the-run, first-contact narratives." Matt Donato of Slash Film rated the film a 7 out of 10 and wrote that it "nimbly condenses similar, more complicated stories for a greater storytelling accomplishment."

Nick Allen of RogerEbert.com gave the film a negative review and wrote, "Stone’s movie is one of the most frustrating kinds to run into while covering a festival comprised of upcoming filmmakers, the calling card project." Joshua Speiser of Film Threat awarded the film two stars out of five and wrote, "Try as I might, I just wasn’t all that invested in the fate of Alex and Sean or their own private close encounter with the third kind. Which is a shame as the filmmaker shows a keen flair for creating both an interesting visual and aural palette." Peter Debruge of Variety gave the film a negative review and wrote that it "doesn’t invent anything new, per se, but somehow, in splicing elements from other movies, it fails to achieve the emotional core of its own formula." Justin Lowe of The Hollywood Reporter also gave the film a negative review and wrote, "Lacking the flash of big-budget blockbusters or the originality of a uniquely imagined world, First Light is left trying to make the best of overly familiar sci-fi themes."
