= Rick Astley discography =

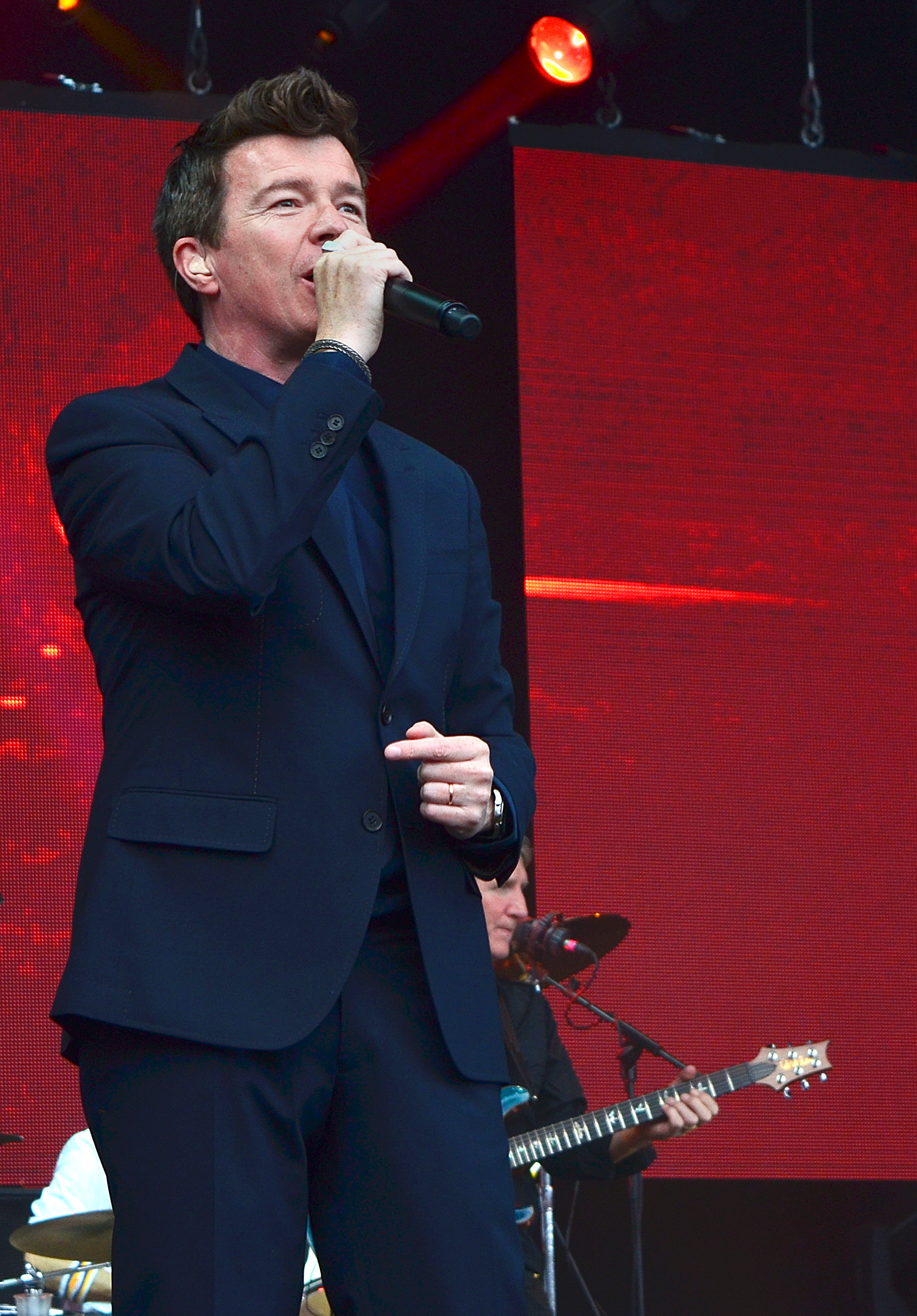
- Astley in 2014
- Studio albums: 9
- Compilation albums: 12
- Singles: 24
- Video albums: 2
- Music videos: 36
- Remix albums: 2

The discography of English singer and songwriter Rick Astley consists of nine studio albums, five compilation albums, two remix albums, twenty-four singles, two video albums and 36 music videos. Astley attained five Top-10 US hits and eight Top-10 UK hits.

His debut studio album, Whenever You Need Somebody, was released in November 1987. It peaked at No. 1 on the UK Albums Chart and No. 10 on the US Billboard 200. Astley became a pop sensation in 1987 with his debut single "Never Gonna Give You Up" written by the trio Stock Aitken Waterman. The song was at No. 1 on the UK Singles Chart for five weeks, becoming the year's highest-selling single. The song was also a worldwide hit, hitting number one in twenty-four other countries, including the US, Australia, and Germany, and the top ten in several other countries. "Whenever You Need Somebody" was released as the second single (although not released in North America) from the album in October 1987. The single was a recycled Stock, Aitken, Waterman song, originally recorded by O'Chi Brown in 1985. It reached number one in seven countries, including Germany and Sweden. It also reached No. 3 in the UK. In December 1987, Astley's record label released a cover version of the Nat King Cole classic "When I Fall in Love" as the third single. This single was also not released in North America. The song reached the top ten or top twenty in various European countries single. Astley's fourth single release (and second North American single) would be "Together Forever" in 1988, reaching No. 2 in the UK. It was denied the top spot by Kylie Minogue's debut "I Should Be So Lucky". The song was also successful in the US, reaching number 1, making it his second US chart topper. The next single, "It Would Take a Strong Strong Man", would have a North American release but not a European release. The song reached No. 10 on the US Billboard Hot 100 and No. 1 in Canada. The album has been certified 2× platinum in the US and 4× platinum in the UK.

Astley's second studio album, Hold Me in Your Arms, was modesty successful when compared to its predecessor. Released in November 1988, it has since been certified gold in the US and platinum in the UK. The album peaked at No. 8 on the UK Albums Chart (scoring three top ten singles there) and No. 19 on the US Billboard 200 (scoring one top ten single). The lead single, "She Wants to Dance with Me" became a hit, reaching the top ten or top twenty in various countries worldwide. In Europe, "Take Me to Your Heart" and "Hold Me in Your Arms" were released as the second and third singles, respectively. "Giving Up on Love" was released as the second single in the US, reaching No. 38. It was later released in some countries in Europe as the fourth and final single off. A cover of The Temptations' "Ain't Too Proud to Beg" was released as the third and last single in the US and Japan, becoming a minor US hit, peaking at #89.

Astley's third studio album, Free, was released in March 1991. It peaked at No. 9 on the UK Albums Chart and No. 31 on the US Billboard 200. It was his first album not to be produced by the noted production team of Stock Aitken Waterman. The album featured one single that became a top-ten hit in the US and the UK, "Cry for Help". Two additional singles, "Move Right Out" and "Never Knew Love" were less successful.

Astley's fourth studio album, Body & Soul, was released in September 1993. It peaked at No. 185 on the US Billboard 200 but failed to chart in the UK. Two singles were released from the album, "The Ones You Love" and "Hopelessly", however, both singles failed to reach the top-twenty in the US or UK. After this album, Astley left the music business for several years and released no new material until 2001.

His fifth studio album, Keep It Turned On, was released in December 2001. The album did not chart on most major music charts internationally, but peaked at No. 56 on the German Albums Chart. Two singles were released from the album "Sleeping" and "Keep It Turned On". "Sleeping" peaked at No. 60 in Germany and No. 69 in Switzerland.

Astley's sixth studio album, Portrait, was released in October 2005. The album peaked at No. 26 on the UK Albums Chart, becoming his first album to chart in the UK since Free in 1991. Another album, My Red Book, was planned to be released in January 2013. This unreleased album contains songs such as "Lights Out", "Superman" and "Goodbye But Not the End". "Let It Rain" and "I Like the Sun" appear on his album 50. "Lights Out" was released in 2010, his first single released in the UK for almost 17 years.

His seventh studio album, 50, was released in June 2016. The album peaked at No. 1 on the UK Albums Chart, becoming Astley's first number-one album since his 1987 debut album, Whenever You Need Somebody. "Keep Singing" was released as the lead single from the album on 6 April 2016, peaking to No. 127 on the UK Singles Chart. "Angels on My Side" was released as the second single from the album on 13 May 2016.

His eighth studio album, Beautiful Life, was released in July 2018. The album peaked at No. 6 on the UK Albums Chart, becoming Astley's fifth top-ten album in the United Kingdom. The album includes the singles "Beautiful Life" and "Empty Heart".

His greatest hits album, The Best of Me, was released in October 2019. The first compilation to be compiled by Astley, it features hit singles and album tracks throughout Astley's career. The deluxe version of the album includes a second disc which features several pianoforte versions of the singles featured on the first disc. A pianoforte version of "Never Gonna Give You Up" is included on the first disc.

His most recent studio album Are We There Yet? was released in 2023.

== Albums ==
=== Studio albums ===
Title	Details	Peak chart positions										Certifications (sales threshold)
Title	Details	UK	AUS	AUT	CAN	GER	NL	NZ	SWE	SWI	US	Certifications (sales threshold)
Whenever You Need Somebody	Release date: 16 November 1987; Label: RCA; Formats: Cassette, CD, LP	1	1	3	2	1	2	3	2	2	10	UK: 4× Platinum; AUS: 3× Platinum; CAN: 4× Platinum; US: 2× Platinum
Hold Me in Your Arms	Release date: 26 November 1988; Label: RCA; Formats: Cassette, CD, LP	8	19	30	3	3	42	28	7	11	19	UK: Platinum; AUS: Platinum; CAN: 2× Platinum; US: Gold
Free	Release date: 12 March 1991; Label: RCA; Formats: Cassette, CD, LP	9	20	24	17	8	23	—	16	26	31	UK: Gold
Body & Soul	Release date: 28 September 1993; Label: RCA; Formats: Cassette, CD	—	—	—	—	—	—	—	—	—	185	
Keep It Turned On	Release date: 3 December 2001; Label: Cruz Music/Polydor; Formats: CD, LP	—	—	—	—	56	—	—	—	—	—	
Portrait	Release date: 17 October 2005; Label: RCA; Formats: CD, digital download	26	—	—	—	—	—	—	—	—	—	
50	Release date: 10 June 2016; Label: BMG; Formats: CD, LP, digital download	1	—	41	—	21	65	—	—	44	—	UK: Platinum
Beautiful Life	Release date: 13 July 2018; Label: BMG; Formats: Cassette, CD, LP, digital download	6	—	70	—	40	—	—	—	44	—	UK: Silver
Are We There Yet?	Release date: 13 October 2023; Label: BMG; Formats: Cassette, CD, LP, digital download	2	—	—	—	29	—	—	—	—	—	
"—" denotes a recording that did not chart or was not released in that territory.

=== Compilation albums ===
Title	Details	Peak chart positions				Certifications (sales threshold)
Title	Details	UK	AUS	GER	SPA	Certifications (sales threshold)
Together Forever – Greatest Hits and More...	Release date: 2000 (Taiwan); Label: RCA	—	—	—	—	
Greatest Hits	Release date: 19 March 2002 (US) 28 August 2002 (EU); Label: BMG	16	—	—	—	UK: Gold
The Best of Rick Astley – Never Gonna Give You Up	Release date: 11 March 2003; Label: BMG	—	—	—	—	
Love Songs	Release date: February 2004; Label: BMG	—	—	—	—	
The Platinum and Gold Collection – Rick Astley	Release date: 9 March 2004; Label: Arista	—	—	—	—	
Artist Collection: Rick Astley	Release date: 12 October 2004; Label: BMG	—	—	—	—	
Collections	Release date: 2006; Label: Sony BMG	—	—	—	—	
Together Forever – The Best of Rick Astley	Release date: 16 July 2007 (UK); Label: Music Club	—	—	—	—	
Ultimate Collection	Release date: 28 April 2008 (EU); Label: Sony BMG	17	—	—	—	
Playlist: The Very Best of Rick Astley	Release date: 17 June 2008 (US); Label: Sony BMG	—	—	—	—	
The Best Of	Release date: 6 October 2014; Label: Camden, Sony Music	—	—	—	—	
Greatest Hits	Release date: 5 November 2014 (Japan); Label: RCA	—	—	—	—	
The Best of Me	Release date: 25 October 2019; Label: BMG	4	175	76	25	UK: Gold
"—" denotes a recording that did not chart or was not released in that territory.

=== Remix albums ===
Title	Details
Dance Mixes	Release date: 1990; Re-release: July 2007; Label: RCA
12" Collection	Release date: 1999; Re-release: 2006; Label: BMG

=== Unreleased albums ===
Title	Details
My Red Book	Release date: 2013 (promo only); Label: Cruz Music; Formats: CD

== Singles ==
=== As lead artist ===
Title	Year	Peak chart positions											Certifications	Album
Title	Year	UK	AUS	BEL	CAN	GER	IRE	NL	NZ	SWE	SWI	US	Certifications	Album
"Never Gonna Give You Up"	1987	1	1	1	1	1	2	1	1	1	2	1	UK: Platinum; AUS: Gold; CAN: Gold; GER: Gold; NZ: 3× Platinum; SWE: Gold; US: 5× Platinum	Whenever You Need Somebody
"Whenever You Need Somebody"^{[A]}	1987	3	3	2	—	1	3	2	9	1	1	—		Whenever You Need Somebody
"When I Fall in Love" / "My Arms Keep Missing You"^{[A]}	1987	2	5	1	—	6	2	3	25	12	14	—	UK: Silver	Whenever You Need Somebody
"Together Forever"	1988	2	19	2	1	5	1	12	10	—	14	1	CAN: Gold	Whenever You Need Somebody
"It Would Take a Strong Strong Man"^{[B]}	1988	—	—	—	1	—	—	—	—	—	—	10		Whenever You Need Somebody
"She Wants to Dance with Me"	1988	6	15	3	1	10	4	8	10	12	12	6		Hold Me in Your Arms
"Take Me to Your Heart"^{[A]}	1988	8	41	11	—	10	5	11	43	10	16	—		Hold Me in Your Arms
"Hold Me in Your Arms"^{[A]}	1989	10	77	25	—	32	7	35	—	—	—	—		Hold Me in Your Arms
"Giving Up on Love"^{[B]}	1989	—	—	—	45	—	—	—	—	—	—	38		Hold Me in Your Arms
"Ain't Too Proud to Beg"^{[B]}	1989	—	—	—	—	—	—	—	—	—	—	89		Hold Me in Your Arms
"Cry for Help"	1991	7	13	5	4	14	9	11	—	17	—	7		Free
"Move Right Out"	1991	58	110	—	36	52	—	66	—	—	—	81		Free
"Never Knew Love"	1991	70	—	42	—	—	—	—	—	—	—	—		Free
"Hopelessly"	1993	33	—	—	8	—	—	—	—	—	—	28		Body & Soul
"The Ones You Love"		48	132	—	54	54	—	—	—	—	—	—		
"Sleeping"^{[C]}	2001	—	—	—	—	60	—	—	—	—	69	—		Keep It Turned On
"Lights Out"^{[D]}	2010	97	—	—	—	—	—	—	—	—	—	—		My Red Book (unreleased)
"Goodbye But Not The End"	2010	—	—	—	—	—	—	—	—	—	—	—		My Red Book (unreleased)
"Superman"	2012	—	—	—	—	—	—	—	—	—	—	—		My Red Book (unreleased)
"Keep Singing"^{[D]}	2016	127	—	75	—	—	—	—	—	—	—	—		50
"Angels on My Side"^{[D]}	2016	—	—	—	—	—	—	—	—	—	—	—		50
"Dance"^{[D]}	2016	—	—	—	—	—	—	—	—	—	—	—		50
"Beautiful Life"	2018	—	—	69	—	—	—	—	—	—	—	—		Beautiful Life
"Empty Heart"	2018	—	—	—	—	—	—	—	—	—	—	—		Beautiful Life
"Try"	2018	—	—	—	—	—	—	—	—	—	—	—		Beautiful Life
"She Makes Me"	2018	—	—	—	—	—	—	—	—	—	—	—		Beautiful Life
"Giant"	2019	—	—	—	—	—	—	—	—	—	—	—		Non-album single
"Every One of Us"	2019	—	—	77	—	—	—	—	—	—	—	—		The Best of Me
"Love This Christmas"	2020	—	—	—	—	—	—	—	—	—	—	—		Non-album singles
"Unwanted"	2021	—	—	—	—	—	—	—	—	—	—	—		Non-album singles
"Dippin My Feet"	2023	—	—	—	—	—	—	—	—	—	—	—		Are We There Yet?
"Never Gonna Stop"	2023	—	—	—	—	—	—	—	—	—	—	—		Are We There Yet?
"Forever and More"	2023	—	—	—	—	—	—	—	—	—	—	—		Are We There Yet?
"Driving Me Crazy"	2024	—	—	—	—	—	—	—	—	—	—	—		Are We There Yet?
"Waiting on You"	2026	—	—	—	—	—	—	—	—	—	—	—		Non-album singles
"Raindrops"	2026	—	—	—	—	—	—	—	—	—	—	—		Non-album singles
"—" denotes a recording that did not chart or was not released in that territory.

As a featured artist

Title	Year	Peak chart positions									Album
Title	Year	UK	AUS	BEL	GER	IRE	NL	NZ	SWE	SWI	Album
"When You Gonna" (with Lisa Fabien)	1987	—	—	20	—	—	17	—	—	—	Greatest Hits
"Let It Be" (as part of charity group Ferry Aid)	1987	1	28	3	3	2	4	4	9	1	Charity single
"Learning to Live (Without Your Love)" (with O'Chi Brown)	1987	—	—	—	—	—	—	—	—	—	O'chi
"Winter Wonderland" (with Kim Wilde)	2013	—	—	—	—	—	—	—	—	—	Wilde Winter Songbook
"Will o' the Wisp ft. Rick Astley" [3-track EP] (with Will o' the Wisp)	2021	—	—	—	—	—	—	—	—	—	Non-album singles
"Bring Back the Time" (with New Kids on the Block, Salt-N-Pepa, and En Vogue)	2022	—	—	—	—	—	—	—	—	—	Non-album singles
"Owner of a Lonely Heart" (with Trevor Horn)	2023	—	—	—	—	—	—	—	—	—	Echoes: Ancient & Modern
"—" denotes a recording that did not chart or was not released in that territory.

=== Promotional singles ===
Title	Year	Album
"Wonderful You"	1991	Free
"Keep It Turned On"^{[C]}	2002	Keep It Turned On
"Vincent"	2005	Portrait
"Pray with Me"	2016	50

== Videography ==
=== Video albums ===
Title	Video details
Video Hits	Released: 1989; Label: BMG Video; Format: VHS, Laserdisc
The Artist Collection	Released: 2004; Label: Sony BMG Music Entertainment; Format: DVD

=== Music videos ===
Year	Title	Album
1987	"Never Gonna Give You Up"	Whenever You Need Somebody
1987	"Whenever You Need Somebody"	Whenever You Need Somebody
1987	"When I Fall in Love"	Whenever You Need Somebody
1987	"Together Forever"	Whenever You Need Somebody
1988	"It Would Take a Strong Strong Man"	Whenever You Need Somebody
1988	"She Wants to Dance with Me"	Hold Me in Your Arms
1988	"Take Me to Your Heart"	Hold Me in Your Arms
1988	"Hold Me in Your Arms"	Hold Me in Your Arms
1989	"Giving Up on Love"	Hold Me in Your Arms
1991	"Cry for Help"	Free
1991	"Move Right Out"	Free
1991	"Never Knew Love"	Free
1993	"Hopelessly"	Body & Soul
1993	"The Ones You Love"	Body & Soul
2001	"Sleeping"	Keep It Turned On
2006	"Vincent"	Portrait
2010	"Lights Out"	non-album
2016	"Keep Singing"	50
2016	"Angels on My Side"	50
2016	"Dance"	50
2017	"Pray with Me"	50
2017	"This Old House"	50
2018	"Walk Like a Panther"	50
2018	"Beautiful Life"	Beautiful Life
2018	"Try"	Beautiful Life
2018	"She Makes Me"	Beautiful Life
2019	"Giant" (tour video)	non-album
2019	"Every One of Us" (rehearsal video)	The Best of Me
2020	"Every One of Us" (with The Unsung Heroes)	The Best of Me
2020	"Love This Christmas"	non-album
2023	"Dippin My Feet"	Are We There Yet?
2023	"Never Gonna Stop"	Are We There Yet?
2023	"Forever and More"	Are We There Yet?
2024	"Driving Me Crazy"	Are We There Yet?
2026	"Waiting on You"	non-album
2026	"Raindrops"	non-album

== Notes ==
- A Not released in North America.
- B Not released in the United Kingdom and most of Europe.
- C Released in Germany and Switzerland only.
- D Promoted in the United Kingdom only.
