= Greatest Hits (Rick Astley album) =

Greatest hits album by Rick Astley
- Released: 28 August 2002 (EU); 2 September 2002 (UK); 19 March 2003 (US)
- Recorded: 1987–2002
- Genres: Pop; dance-pop; adult contemporary
- Length: 58:26; 70:00 (US version)
- Label: BMG
- Producers: Stock Aitken Waterman; Chris Braide; Rick Astley; Gary Stevenson

Rick Astley chronology
Keep It Turned On (2001)	Greatest Hits (2002)	The Best of Rick Astley – Never Gonna Give You Up (2003)

Professional ratings
Review scores
Source	Rating
MSN Music	4/5 stars

Greatest Hits is a compilation by English singer Rick Astley released in the UK in 2002 and in the US a year later. While the American version features alternate mixes focused between 1987 and 1991, the European version features hits up to his 2002 album Keep It Turned On. It sold over 100,000 copies in the UK and was certified gold by the BPI. The UK release saw the debut appearance of Astley's 2001 single "Sleeping", thus making it a brand-new track for listeners.

== Track listing ==
International release
No.	Title	Writer(s)	Original release	Length
1.	"Never Gonna Give You Up"	Stock Aitken Waterman	Whenever You Need Somebody, 1987	3:33
2.	"Whenever You Need Somebody" (single version)	Stock Aitken Waterman	Whenever You Need Somebody	3:27
3.	"When I Fall in Love"	Edward Heyman; Victor Young	Whenever You Need Somebody	3:03
4.	"My Arms Keep Missing You"	Stock Aitken Waterman	"When I Fall in Love" single, 1987	3:13
5.	"Together Forever"	Stock Aitken Waterman	Whenever You Need Somebody	3:22
6.	"It Would Take a Strong Strong Man"	Stock Aitken Waterman	Whenever You Need Somebody	3:40
7.	"She Wants to Dance with Me"	Rick Astley	Hold Me in Your Arms, 1988	3:16
8.	"Take Me to Your Heart"	Stock Aitken Waterman	Hold Me in Your Arms	3:29
9.	"Hold Me in Your Arms"	Astley	Hold Me in Your Arms	4:32
10.	"Cry for Help" (single version)	Astley; Rob Fisher	Free, 1991	4:06
11.	"Move Right Out"	Astley; Fisher	Free	3:54
12.	"Never Knew Love"	Derek Bordeaux; John Paul	Free	3:07
13.	"The Ones You Love" (single version)	Astley; Dave West	Body & Soul, 1993	4:20
14.	"Hopelessly"	Astley; Fisher	Body & Soul	3:36
15.	"Body and Soul"	Astley	Body & Soul	4:10
16.	"Sleeping"	Astley; Chris Braide	Keep It Turned On, 2001	3:41
Total length:				58:26

US release
No.	Title	Writer(s)	Original release	Length
1.	"Never Gonna Give You Up"	Stock Aitken Waterman	Whenever You Need Somebody	3:33
2.	"It Would Take a Strong Strong Man"	Stock Aitken Waterman	Whenever You Need Somebody	3:40
3.	"She Wants to Dance with Me"	Astley	Hold Me in Your Arms	3:16
4.	"Whenever You Need Somebody" (single version)	Stock Aitken Waterman	Whenever You Need Somebody	3:27
5.	"Move Right Out"	Astley; Fisher	Free	3:54
6.	"Giving Up on Love"	Astley	Hold Me in Your Arms	4:07
7.	"Together Forever"	Stock Aitken Waterman	Whenever You Need Somebody	3:22
8.	"Take Me to Your Heart"	Stock Aitken Waterman	Hold Me in Your Arms	3:29
9.	"My Arms Keep Missing You"	Stock Aitken Waterman	"When I Fall in Love" single	3:13
10.	"Ain't Too Proud to Beg"	Eddie Holland; Norman Whitfield	Hold Me in Your Arms	4:17
11.	"Hopelessly"	Astley; Fisher	Body & Soul	3:36
12.	"When You Gonna" (Rick Astley and Lisa Fabien)	Astley; Ian Curnow; Phil Harding	"When You Gonna" single, 1987	7:34
13.	"Never Knew Love"	Derek Bordeaux; John Paul	Free	3:07
14.	"Hold Me in Your Arms"	Astley	Hold Me in Your Arms	4:32
15.	"When I Fall in Love"	Heyman; Young	Whenever You Need Somebody	3:03
16.	"Cry for Help" (single version)	Astley; Fisher	Free	4:06
17.	"The Ones You Love" (single version)	Astley; West	Body & Soul	4:20
Total length:				70:00

== Charts ==
Chart	Peak position
Danish Albums Chart	5
UK Albums Chart	16

== "When You Gonna" ==
"When You Gonna"

Single by Rick Astley and Lisa Fabien

from the album Greatest Hits
- B-side: "When You Gonna" (dub mix)
- Released: May 1987
- Recorded: 1987
- Genre: Dance-pop
- Length: 3:32
- Label: RCA; BMG Heritage
- Songwriters: Rick Astley; Ian Curnow; Phil Harding
- Producers: Phil Harding; Ian Curnow

Rick Astley singles chronology
"When You Gonna" (1987)	"Never Gonna Give You Up" (1987)

"When You Gonna" is a duet by Rick Astley and singer Lisa Fabien; the song was released in May 1987, and with no promotion managed to chart at No. 17 in the Netherlands and No. 20 in Belgium. It also charted on the US Billboard Dance Club Songs chart at No. 11. It was the first single to feature Astley, prior to his international hit "Never Gonna Give You Up".

=== Track listing ===
7″ single

1. "When You Gonna" – 3:28
2. "When You Gonna" (dub mix) – 5:48
