= Ultimate Collection (Rick Astley album) =

Compilation album by Rick Astley
- Released: 2008
- Recorded: 1987–2005
- Genre: pop; dance-pop
- Length: 62:33
- Label: Sony BMG

Rick Astley chronology
Together Forever – The Best of Rick Astley (2007)	Ultimate Collection (2008)	Playlist: The Very Best of Rick Astley (2008)

Ultimate Collection is a compilation album by English singer-songwriter Rick Astley, released by Sony BMG in 2008. It contains the song "Full of You", considered previously unreleased as it only appears on the Germany album Keep It Turned On. The album reached #17 on the UK Album Chart.

== Track listing ==
International release
No.	Title	Writer(s)	Original release	Length
1.	"Never Gonna Give You Up"	Stock Aitken Waterman	Whenever You Need Somebody, 1987	3:34
2.	"Together Forever"	Stock Aitken Waterman	Whenever You Need Somebody	3:22
3.	"My Arms Keep Missing You"	Stock Aitken Waterman	"When I Fall in Love" single, 1987	3:15
4.	"Whenever You Need Somebody"	Stock Aitken Waterman	Whenever You Need Somebody	3:27
5.	"She Wants to Dance with Me"	Rick Astley	Hold Me in Your Arms, 1988	3:16
6.	"When I Fall in Love"	Edward Heyman; Victor Young	Whenever You Need Somebody	3:03
7.	"Cry for Help"	Astley; Rob Fisher	Free, 1991	4:05
8.	"Take Me to Your Heart"	Stock Aitken Waterman	Hold Me in Your Arms	3:29
9.	"It Would Take a Strong Strong Man"	Stock Aitken Waterman	Whenever You Need Somebody	3:40
10.	"Hold Me in Your Arms"	Astley	Hold Me in Your Arms	4:32
11.	"Hopelessly"	Astley; Fisher	Body & Soul, 1993	3:36
12.	"Move Right Out"	Astley; Fisher	Free	3:55
13.	"The Ones You Love"	Astley; Dave West	Body & Soul	4:20
14.	"Never Knew Love"	Derek Bordeaux; John Paul	Free	3:07
15.	"Body and Soul"	Astley	Body & Soul	4:11
16.	"Vincent"	Don McLean	Portrait, 2005	3:22
17.	"Full of You"	Astley	Keep It Turned On, 2001	4:28
Total length:				62:33
