= Hold Me in Your Arms =

Hold Me in Your Arms may refer to:

- "Hold Me in Your Arms" by Ray Heindorf, Charles Henderson and Don Pippin, popularized by Doris Day in the movie Young at Heart
- "Hold Me in Your Arms" by Brad Paisley
- Hold Me in Your Arms (album), a 1988 album by Rick Astley
  - "Hold Me in Your Arms" (Rick Astley song), 1988
- "Hold Me in Your Arms" (Southern Sons song), 1991
- "Hold Me in Your Arms" by The Black Keys, from their album Thickfreakness
- "Hold Me in Your Arms" (The Trews song), a 2007 song by The Trews from their album No Time for Later
- "Hold Me In Your Arms", a song recorded by Pixie Lott
