= The Best of Me (Rick Astley album) =

Greatest hits album by Rick Astley
- Released: 25 October 2019
- Labels: RCA; BMG
- Producers: Rick Astley; Matt Aitken; Mike Stock; Peter Waterman; Phil Harding; Ian Curnow; Gary Stevenson; Chris Braide; Andrew Frampton

Rick Astley chronology
Beautiful Life (2018)	The Best of Me (2019)	Are We There Yet? (2023)

Singles from The Best of Me
- 1. "Every One of Us" Released: 12 September 2019

The Best of Me is a greatest hits album by British singer-songwriter Rick Astley. It was released on 25 October 2019 by RCA Records and BMG. The album includes the single "Every One of Us", which was released in September 2019. The Best of Me reached No. 4 on the UK Albums Chart and No. 1 on the UK Independent Albums chart.

The album has two discs, a disc of old recordings, and a second disc that consists of new recordings of "reimagined" old songs with new interpretation. It includes a stripped-back, slowed-down version of "Never Gonna Give You Up" accompanied by pianoforte. It also includes a new song, "Every One of Us", which was released on 12 September 2019 as the first single from the album with a post on Twitter from Astley, who also confirmed the title of the album and its release date.

In 2024, it was re-issued with additional tracks and re-titled The Best of Me - Never Edition, in cross promotion with his memoirs Never.

== Track listing ==
All tracks written and produced by Rick Astley, except where noted.

Disc 1

No.	Title	Writer(s)	Producer(s)	Length
1.	"Every One of Us"			3:06
2.	"Never Gonna Give You Up"	Stock Aitken Waterman	Matt Aitken; Mike Stock; Peter Waterman	3:33
3.	"Whenever You Need Somebody"	Stock Aitken Waterman	Aitken; Stock; Waterman	3:52
4.	"When I Fall in Love"	Edward Heyman; Victor Young	Aitken; Stock; Waterman	2:59
5.	"Together Forever"	Stock Aitken Waterman	Aitken; Stock; Waterman	3:24
6.	"It Would Take a Strong Strong Man"	Stock Aitken Waterman	Aitken; Stock; Waterman	3:39
7.	"She Wants to Dance with Me"		Phil Harding; Ian Curnow; Astley	3:14
8.	"Take Me to Your Heart"	Stock Aitken Waterman	Aitken; Stock; Waterman	3:27
9.	"Hold Me in Your Arms"		Harding; Curnow	4:32
10.	"Cry for Help" (Single Edit)	Astley; Rob Fisher	Gary Stevenson; Astley	4:03
11.	"Sleeping" (Edit)	Chris Braide; Astley	Braide; Astley	3:43
12.	"Lights Out"	Astley; Andrew Frampton	Frampton	3:12
13.	"Keep Singing"			3:58
14.	"Angels on My Side"			3:35
15.	"God Says / Dance"			3:15
16.	"This Old House"			4:30
17.	"Beautiful Life"			3:43
18.	"Try"			3:55
19.	"She Makes Me"			3:34
20.	"Never Gonna Give You Up" (Pianoforte)	Stock Aitken Waterman		3:33

Disc 2 – Reimagined Classics

No.	Title	Writer(s)	Length
1.	"Together Forever" (Reimagined)	Stock Aitken Waterman	4:01
2.	"Whenever You Need Somebody" (Reimagined)	Stock Aitken Waterman	4:00
3.	"When I Fall in Love" (Reimagined)	Heyman; Young	3:37
4.	"Beautiful Life" (Reimagined)		3:30
5.	"She Wants to Dance with Me" (Reimagined)		3:20
6.	"Hold Me in Your Arms" (Reimagined)		3:43
7.	"Cry for Help" (Reimagined)	Astley; Fisher	3:49
8.	"Keep Singing" (Reimagined)		3:41
9.	"Angels on My Side" (Reimagined)		3:49
10.	"Try" (Reimagined)		3:46

The Best Of Me: Never Edition

No.	Title	Length
1.	"Never Gonna Stop"	3:17
2.	"Never Gonna Give You Up"	3:33
3.	"Whenever You Need Somebody"	3:52
4.	"Cry for Help" (Single Edit)	4:03
5.	"Beautiful Life"	3:43
6.	"Keep Singing"	3:58
7.	"When I Fall in Love"	2:59
8.	"Together Forever"	3:24
9.	"It Would Take a Strong Strong Man"	3:39
10.	"She Wants to Dance with Me"	3:14
11.	"Dippin My Feet"	3:13
12.	"Giant"	3:49
13.	"Unwanted (Song from the Podcast)"	3:25
14.	"Every One of Us"	3:06
15.	"Ain't Too Proud to Beg"	4:18
16.	"Take Me to Your Heart"	3:27
17.	"Hold Me in Your Arms"	4:32
18.	"Angels on My Side"	3:35
19.	"Sleeping" (Edit)	3:43
20.	"Lights Out"	3:12
21.	"Dance"	3:15
22.	"Driving Me Crazy"	3:32
23.	"This Old House"	4:30
24.	"Try"	3:55
25.	"She Makes Me"	3:34
26.	"Forever and More"	3:37
27.	"Never Gonna Give You Up" (Pianoforte)	3:33
28.	"Together Forever" (Reimagined)	4:01
29.	"Whenever You Need Somebody" (Reimagined)	4:00
30.	"When I Fall in Love" (Reimagined)	3:37
31.	"Beautiful Life" (Reimagined)	3:30
32.	"She Wants to Dance with Me" (Reimagined)	3:20
33.	"Hold Me in Your Arms" (Reimagined)	3:43
34.	"Cry for Help" (Reimagined)	3:49
35.	"Keep Singing" (Reimagined)	3:41
36.	"Angels on My Side" (Reimagined)	3:49
37.	"Try" (Reimagined)	3:46
38.	"Love This Christmas"	3:11

== Personnel ==
Musicians

- Rob Taggart – piano
- Simon Merry – drums
- Julian Cox – bass
- Adam Evans – guitar
- Dawn Joseph, Lauren Johnson, Stephanie Sounds, Annabel Williams – backing vocals
- Rick Astley – all instruments on track 6, 8, 9, 10

Technical

- Recording engineers: Rick Astley, Bob Macfarlane & Mathieu Lejeune
- Recorded at Grey Room, Chicago Recording Company & Dean Street Studios
- All tracks mixed by Daniel Frampton
- All tracks mastered by Dick Beetham at 360 Mastering
- Photography by Peter Niell

== Charts ==
Chart performance for The Best of Me
Chart (2019)	Peak position
Australian Digital Albums (ARIA)	50
German Albums (Offizielle Top 100)	76
Irish Albums (IRMA)	91
Scottish Albums (Official Charts)	3
Spanish Albums (PROMUSICAE)	25
UK Albums (Official Charts)	4
UK Independent Albums (Official Charts)	1

== Certifications ==
Certifications for The Best of Me
Region	Certification	Certified units/sales
United Kingdom (BPI)	Gold	100,000^{‡}
^{‡} Sales+streaming figures based on certification alone.
