= My Red Book =

Studio album by Rick Astley
- Released: Unreleased
- Recorded: 2008–2013
- Genre: Adult contemporary
- Length: 35:44
- Label: Cruz Music

Rick Astley chronology
Playlist: The Very Best of Rick Astley (2008)	My Red Book (Unreleased)	The Best Of (2014)

My Red Book is an unreleased studio album by English singer Rick Astley. This album was originally planned to release in January 2013, but it was ultimately canceled for unknown reasons. This unreleased album contains the singles "Lights Out", and "Superman".

"I Like the Sun" and a re-recording of "Let It Rain" later appeared on Astley's 2016 album 50, with "A Letter" and a remix of "Sailing" appearing on the US edition.

== Track listing ==
1. "Superman" – 3:22
2. "I Like the Sun" – 3:46
3. "Let It Rain" – 4:31
4. "Sailing" – 2:50
5. "Saddest Day" – 3:33
6. "Lights Out" – 3:17
7. "Goodbye But Not the End" – 3:27
8. "The Bitch" – 2:59
9. "A Letter" – 3:55
10. "Josie" – 4:04
