= Whenever You Need Somebody =

Studio album by Rick Astley
- Released: 16 November 1987
- Recorded: 1986–1987
- Studios: PWL Studios 1 & 2 (London)
- Genres: Pop; dance-pop
- Length: 36:42
- Label: RCA
- Producers: Stock Aitken Waterman; Phil Harding; Ian Curnow; Daize Washbourn

Rick Astley chronology
Whenever You Need Somebody (1987)	Hold Me in Your Arms (1988)

Singles from Whenever You Need Somebody
- 1. "Never Gonna Give You Up" Released: 27 July 1987; 2. "Whenever You Need Somebody" Released: 19 October 1987; 3. "When I Fall in Love" Released: 30 November 1987; 4. "Together Forever" Released: 15 February 1988; 5. "It Would Take a Strong Strong Man" Released: July 1988 (US)

Whenever You Need Somebody is the debut studio album by English singer Rick Astley, released on 16 November 1987 by RCA Records. It is his highest-selling album and has sold 15.2 million copies worldwide. The album is listed as the 136th best-selling album in Spain and was the seventh best-selling album of 1987 in the United Kingdom. A remastered version, containing rare remixes and extended versions, was released on 12 April 2010.

== Critical reception ==
Professional ratings
Review scores
Source	Rating
AllMusic	4/5 stars
New Musical Express	7/10
Smash Hits	9/10
The Village Voice	D+

Alex Henderson of AllMusic stated Astley and his producers "should definitely be proud of their work" on this "often captivating debut album" which "proved [the singer] to be a welcome addition to the British R&B scene"; he added that the "music approach is very much a production of the '70s" and underlined tracks like "Together Forever", "Never Gonna Give You Up" and "Don't Say Goodbye". In contrast, Robert Christgau of The Village Voice gave a much more negative review and ranked the album in the "Must to avoid" category, and added: "Musically [Astley]'s a throwback to such long-forgotten big-band singers manqué as Don Rondo" revealed "as I-am-somebody for nobodies with a master plan". James Hamilton of Record Mirror presented the album as being "as vigorously voiced and unsubtle as you'd expect". Carmen Keats of Melody Maker described the album as "Yuppie-boy muzak for those too poor and thick to be Yuppies." According to a reviewer of British magazine Music Week, the album proves Astley to be "a respectable if so far unexceptional writer", but concluded that the tone of the whole album was established by the production team. Chris Heath of Smash Hits praised the album full of songs with "the same straightforward, deliriously catchy dance music as his first two hits", and underlined "Don't Say Goodbye" and "When I Fall in Love" as "brilliant" songs. Retrospectively, in 2018, Mark Elliot of Classic Pop considered Whenever You Need Somebody as the ninth best album ever produced by Stock Aitken Waterman and underlined its worldwide success, selling 15 million copies.

== Track listing ==
=== Original 1987 release ===
All tracks are written by and produced by Stock Aitken Waterman, except where noted.

Side one
No.	Title	Writer(s)	Producer(s)	Length
1.	"Never Gonna Give You Up"			3:35
2.	"Whenever You Need Somebody"			3:52
3.	"Together Forever"			3:24
4.	"It Would Take a Strong Strong Man"			3:39
5.	"The Love Has Gone"	Rick Astley; Dick Spatsley	Phil Harding; Ian Curnow	4:20

Side two
No.	Title	Writer(s)	Producer(s)	Length
6.	"Don't Say Goodbye"			4:11
7.	"Slipping Away"	Astley	Harding; Curnow	3:52
8.	"No More Looking for Love"	Astley	Daize Washbourn	3:10
9.	"You Move Me"	Astley	Washbourn	3:40
10.	"When I Fall in Love"	Edward Heyman; Victor Young		2:59
Total length:				36:42

=== 2010 expanded remaster ===
Disc one bonus tracks
No.	Title	Writer(s)	Length
11.	"When You Gonna" (7" mix) (credited to Rick & Lisa)	Curnow; Harding; Astley	3:32
12.	"Just Good Friends"	Astley	3:45
13.	"I'll Never Set You Free"	Astley	3:34
14.	"When You Gonna" (extended mix) (credited to Rick & Lisa)		7:32
15.	"Never Gonna Give You Up" (Cake mix)		5:48
16.	"Whenever You Need Somebody" (Lonely Hearts mix)		7:34
17.	"Together Forever" (Lover's Leap extended remix)		7:05

Disc two: The Remixes
No.	Title	Writer(s)	Length
1.	"Whenever You Need Somebody" (7" mix)		3:32
2.	"Together Forever" (Lover's Leap mix)		3:52
3.	"When You Gonna" (Borough Anarchy mix) (credited to Rick & Lisa)	Curnow; Harding; Astley	7:54
4.	"Never Gonna Give You Up" (Escape from Newton mix)		6:25
5.	"Whenever You Need Somebody" (Rick Sets It Off mix)		7:54
6.	"Together Forever" (House of Love mix)		6:55
7.	"It Would Take a Strong Strong Man" (Matt's Jazzy Guitar mix)		7:47
8.	"When You Gonna" (Home Boy mix) (credited to Rick & Lisa)	Curnow; Harding; Astley	5:48
9.	"Never Gonna Give You Up" (Escape to New York mix)		7:02
10.	"Whenever You Need Somebody" (XK150 mix)		4:39
11.	"When You Gonna" (bonus beats mix) (credited to Rick & Lisa)	Curnow; Harding; Astley	4:46
12.	"Never Gonna Give You Up" (12" Instrumental)		6:18
13.	"Whenever You Need Somebody" (instrumental)		3:51
14.	"It Would Take a Strong Strong Man" (instrumental)		3:32

=== 2022 Remaster ===
Disc one bonus tracks
No.	Title	Writer(s)	Producer(s)	Length
11.	"My Arms Keep Missing You"			3:14
12.	"I'll Never Set You Free" (7″" mix)		Astley	3:26
13.	"Just Good Friends"	Astley		3:50
14.	"Never Gonna Give You Up" (Pianoforte)			3:29
15.	"Together Forever" (Reimagined)			4:01
16.	"Whenever You Need Somebody" (Reimagined)			4:00
17.	"When I Fall in Love" (Reimagined)	Heyman; Young		3:37

Disc two: Remixes and Instrumentals
No.	Title	Length
1.	"Never Gonna Give You Up" (Phil Harding 12" mix)	7:24
2.	"Together Forever" (Lover's Leap remix)	3:20
3.	"My Arms Keep Missing You" (The "Where's Harry" remix)	3:15
4.	"Whenever You Need Somebody" (XK 150 mix)	3:52
5.	"My Arms Keep Missing You" (Bruno's remix)	6:15
6.	"Never Gonna Give You Up" (Cake mix)	5:46
7.	"Whenever You Need Somebody" (Lonely Hearts mix)	7:34
8.	"My Arms Keep Missing You" (No L mix)	6:46
9.	"Never Gonna Give You Up" (Escape from Newton mix)	6:30
10.	"Together Forever" (House of Love mix)	6:57
11.	"Whenever You Need Somebody" (Rick Sets It Off mix)	7:57
12.	"Never Gonna Give You Up" (instrumental)	3:34
13.	"It Would Take a Strong Strong Man" (instrumental)	3:39
14.	"Whenever You Need Somebody" (instrumental)	3:50

== Personnel ==
Credits adapted from the liner notes of Whenever You Need Somebody.

=== Musicians ===
- Rick Astley – vocals; guitars on "No More Looking for Love" and "You Move Me"
- Mike Stock – keyboards
- Matt Aitken – keyboards, guitars
- Paul Cox – guitar on "Together Forever"
- A. Linn – drums (e.g.: Linn 9000 on "Never Gonna Give You Up" and LinnDrum on "It Would Take a Strong Strong Man")
- Ian Curnow – Fairlight programming; keyboards on "The Love Has Gone" and "Slipping Away"
- Daize Washbourn – keyboards and drums on "No More Looking for Love" and "You Move Me"
- Gary Barnacle – saxophone on "Slipping Away"
- Shirley Lewis, Dee Lewis, Mae McKenna, Suzanne Rhatigan – backing vocals

=== Technical ===
- Stock Aitken Waterman – production on "Never Gonna Give You Up", "Whenever You Need Somebody", "Together Forever", "It Would Take a Strong Strong Man", "Don't Say Goodbye", and "When I Fall in Love"
- Phil Harding – production and mixing on "The Love Has Gone" and "Slipping Away"
- Ian Curnow – production on "The Love Has Gone" and "Slipping Away"
- Daize Washbourn – production on "No More Looking for Love" and "You Move Me"
- Mark McGuire – engineering and mixing on "It Would Take a Strong Strong Man" and "When I Fall in Love"
- Phil Harding, Karen Hewitt, Mike Duffy, Jamie Bromfield – additional engineering
- Yoyo, Jonathan King, Peter Day, Boky, Gordon Dennis – engineering assistance
- Pete Hammond – mixing on "Never Gonna Give You Up", "Whenever You Need Somebody", "Together Forever", "Don't Say Goodbye", "No More Looking for Love", and "You Move Me"
- Paul Cox – photographer on "Never Gonna Give You Up"

== Charts ==
=== Weekly charts ===
1987–1988 weekly chart performance for Whenever You Need Somebody
Chart (1987–1988)	Peak position
Australian Albums (Australian Music Report)	1
Austrian Albums (Ö3 Austria)	3
Canada Top Albums/CDs (RPM)	3
Dutch Albums (Album Top 100)	2
European Albums (Music & Media)	1
Finnish Albums (Suomen virallinen lista)	2
French Albums (IFOP)	5
German Albums (Offizielle Top 100)	1
Italian Albums (Musica e dischi)	2
New Zealand Albums (RMNZ)	3
Norwegian Albums (VG-lista)	4
Spanish Albums (AFYVE)	1
Swedish Albums (Sverigetopplistan)	2
Swiss Albums (Schweizer Hitparade)	2
UK Albums (Official Charts)	1
US Billboard 200	10

2022 weekly chart performance for Whenever You Need Somebody
Chart (2022)	Peak position
Belgian Albums (Ultratop Wallonia)	179
Spanish Albums (Promusicae)	100

=== Year-end charts ===
1987 year-end chart performance for Whenever You Need Somebody
Chart (1987)	Position
UK Albums (Gallup)	7

1988 year-end chart performance for Whenever You Need Somebody
Chart (1988)	Position
Australian Albums (ARIA)	4
Austrian Albums (Ö3 Austria)	10
Canada Top Albums/CDs (RPM)	4
Dutch Albums (Album Top 100)	74
European Albums (Music & Media)	5
German Albums (Offizielle Top 100)	7
Norwegian Winter Period Albums (VG-lista)	12
Swiss Albums (Schweizer Hitparade)	30
UK Albums (Gallup)	39
US Billboard 200	15

== Certifications ==
Certifications for Whenever You Need Somebody
Region	Certification	Certified units/sales
Australia (ARIA)	3× Platinum	210,000^{^}
Canada (Music Canada)	4× Platinum	400,000^{^}
Finland (Musiikkituottajat)	Gold	25,253
France (SNEP)	2× Gold	200,000^{*}
Germany (BVMI)	Platinum	500,000^{^}
Hong Kong (IFPI Hong Kong)	Platinum	20,000^{*}
Malaysia	—	34,000
Netherlands (NVPI)	Platinum	100,000^{^}
New Zealand (RMNZ)	Platinum	15,000^{^}
Spain (Promusicae)	3× Platinum	300,000^{^}
Sweden (GLF)	Gold	50,000^{^}
Switzerland (IFPI Switzerland)	Platinum	50,000^{^}
United Kingdom (BPI)	4× Platinum	1,200,000^{^}
United States (RIAA)	2× Platinum	2,000,000^{^}
^{*} Sales figures based on certification alone.^{^} Shipments figures based on certification alone.
