= Together Forever (Rick Astley song) =

1988 single by Rick Astley

Single by Rick Astley

from the album Whenever You Need Somebody
- B-side: "I'll Never Set You Free"
- Released: 15 February 1988
- Genre: Dance-pop; synth-pop; Detroit techno
- Length: 3:24
- Label: RCA; BMG
- Songwriter: Stock Aitken Waterman
- Producer: Stock Aitken Waterman

Rick Astley singles chronology
"When I Fall in Love" / "My Arms Keep Missing You" (1987)	"Together Forever" (1988)	"It Would Take a Strong Strong Man" (1988)

Music video
- "Together Forever" on YouTube

Professional ratings
Review scores
Source	Rating
Number One	4/5 stars

"Together Forever" is a song recorded by English singer-songwriter Rick Astley and released by RCA and BMG in February 1988, as the fourth single from his debut album, Whenever You Need Somebody (1987). The song was both written and produced by Stock Aitken Waterman, and reached number two in the United Kingdom, behind Neighbours star and fellow SAW artist Kylie Minogue's debut single "I Should Be So Lucky". The single was a worldwide hit, reaching number one on the US Billboard Hot 100 on 18 June 1988, becoming Astley's second US chart-topper. It also topped the charts in Canada, Ireland and Spain, and was a top ten hit in many European countries.

== Composition and releases ==
The song uses a similar chord structure and melody to Astley's debut single "Never Gonna Give You Up" (like most songs written and produced by Stock/Aitken/Waterman at the time), and has occasionally been used as an alternate Rickroll song. In 2019, Astley recorded and released a 'Reimagined' version of the song for his album The Best of Me, which features a new piano arrangement. In 1991, "Together Forever" was awarded one of BMI's Pop Awards, honoring the songwriters, composers and music publishers of the song.

== Critical reception ==
Michele Kirsch from NME said, "Wipe out the vocal on this one, Karaoke style, and you can sing 'Never Gonna Give You Up' which is fine by us." She also felt Astley "adds a human touch to all this computerized madness. That's fidelity he's singing about. He's the milk and sugar in the bitter tea of Life." Colin Irwin from Number One wrote, "The song itself is another of those unforgettable little tunes which Mr Stock, Mr Aitken and Mr Waterman write in their sleep. [...] Ricks sings his darling little heart out and it all sounds brill to me."

Eleanor Levy of Record Mirror considered "Together Forever" as being "one more variation on the 'fast one', adding that the formula used for "Never Gonna Give You Up" "is repeated for the umpteenth time and begins to sound tired and not particularly emotional". In a review published in Smash Hits, Patsy Kensit considered it is "not as good as 'Never Gonna Give You Up'", to which it sounds similar but with a different chorus, but added that "as far as that goes in a disco people don't care".

Retrospectively, in 2021, British magazine Classic Pop ranked "Together Forever" number 20 in their list of "Top 40 Stock/Aitken/Waterman songs", naming it, along with "I Should Be So Lucky", "another SAW pop masterpiece". In 2025, Thomas Edward of Smooth Radio ranked the song 12th in his list of "Stock Aitken Waterman's 15 greatest songs, ranked". The same year, he ranked the song number two in his list of "Rick Astley's 10 greatest songs, ever".

== Chart performance ==
In the UK, "Together Forever" started at number nine on 27 February 1988, and reached number two for consecutive two weeks, being blocked from the number one slot by another SAW song, "I Should Be So Lucky", and charted for nine weeks, which led it to be the 49th best-selling single of 1988 in UK. It also topped the singles charts in the Walloon region of Belgium, Spain and Ireland, charting for five weeks in the latter country, peaked at number two in the Flanders region of Belgium, number five in Italy and West Germany, with a 16-week chart run on the West German Singles Chart, and was a top ten hit in Iceland and Austria where it attained number six and ten. In addition, it missed the top ten by one place in Finland and by two places in Denmark and the Netherlands, and culminated at number 14 in Switzerland and number 18 in France.

On the Pan-European Hot 100 Singles chart established by the Music & Media magazine, it debuted at number 31 on 5 March 1988, reached number one for one week two weeks later and charted for 28 weeks divided into two segments due to its late release in France. Much aired in the United Kingdom, West Germany, Austria and France where it topped the airplay charts, it reached number two for consecutive three weeks on the European Airplay Top 50, on which it totaled 15 weeks of presence. Outside Europe, "Together Forever" became Astley's second number one hit on the US Billboard Hot 100, reaching this position for a sole week on 25 February 1988, and remained on the chart for a total of 18 weeks. It also topped the Dance Club Songs chart and reached number two on the Adult Contemporary Chart, was also a number one hit in Canada, a top ten hit in New Zealand, and had less success in Australia, where it peaked at number 19.

== Music video ==
In a YouTube community post saying "Soon all will become clear..." and celebrating the announcement of the Whenever You Need Somebody remastered edition studio album, the music video has been upgraded to 4K as of March 2022, restoring the music video and switching the Lover's Leap remix audio back to the album version when the original music video used the 7" single version. In addition, the single was also reissued as a digital EP on 23 March 2022, which also includes the "reimagined" version from Astley's compilation album The Best of Me.

== Track listing ==
- 7" and mini CD single
1. "Together Forever" (Lover's Leap remix) – 3:20
2. "I'll Never Set You Free" – 3:30
- 12" maxi
1. "Together Forever" (Lover's Leap extended remix) – 7:00
2. "I'll Never Set You Free" – 3:30
- Digital EP
1. "Together Forever" (2022 remaster) – 3:25
2. "Together Forever" (reimagined) – 4:01
3. "Together Forever" (Lover's Leap remix) – 3:20
4. "Together Forever" (House of Love mix) – 6:56

== Personnel ==
=== Musicians ===
- Rick Astley – vocals, liner notes
- Mike Stock, Matt Aitken – keyboards
- Paul Cox – guitar
- A Linn – drums
- Ian Curnow – Fairlight programming
- Shirley Lewis, Dee Lewis, Mae McKenna, Suzanne Rhatigan – backing vocals

=== Technical ===
- Stock Aitken Waterman – production
- Mark McGuire – engineering
- Phil Harding, Karen Hewitt, Mike Duffy, Jamie Bromfield – additional engineering
- Yoyo, Jonathan King, Peter Day, Boky, Gordon Dennis – engineering assistance
- Pete Hammond – mixing

== Charts ==
=== Weekly charts ===
Weekly chart performance for "Together Forever"
Chart (1988–1989)	Peak position
Australia (ARIA)	19
Austria (Ö3 Austria Top 40)	10
Belgium (Ultratop 50 Flanders)	2
Belgium (Ultratop 50 Wallonia)	1
Canada Retail Singles (The Record)	1
Canada Top Singles (RPM)	1
Chile (UPI)	3
Denmark (IFPI)	12
Europe (European Airplay Top 50)	2
Europe (European Hot 100)	1
Finland (Suomen virallinen lista)	11
France (SNEP)	18
Iceland (Íslenski Listinn Topp 10)	6
Ireland (IRMA)	1
Italy (Music & Media)	3
Italy (Musica e dischi)	5
Luxembourg (Radio Luxembourg)	1
Netherlands (Dutch Top 40)	12
Netherlands (Single Top 100)	12
New Zealand (Recorded Music NZ)	10
Panama (UPI)	2
Quebec (ADISQ)	1
Spain (AFYVE)	1
Switzerland (Schweizer Hitparade)	14
UK Dance (Music Week)	4
UK Singles (Official Charts)	2
US Adult Contemporary (Billboard)	2
US Billboard Hot 100	1
US Dance Club Songs (Billboard)	1
West Germany (GfK)	5

=== Year-end charts ===
Year-end chart performance for "Together Forever"
Chart (1988)	Position
Belgium (Ultratop)	54
Canada Top Singles (RPM)	3
Europe (European Hot 100 Singles)	36
Europe (European Airplay Top 50)	13
UK Singles (OCC)	49
US Billboard Hot 100	44
US Adult Contemporary (Billboard)	38
West Germany (Media Control)	42

== Cover versions ==
The song has been covered by artists such as José Galisteo, Jolina Magdangal, and Nina Nesbitt. The Voice coaches Blake Shelton, John Legend, Kelly Clarkson and Nick Jonas covered the song to celebrate the show's 20th season, with Astley calling their version of the song "incredible." The song was used as a demo on the Casio CA-100 electronic keyboard.
