= Hold Me in Your Arms (album) =

Studio album by Rick Astley
- Released: 26 November 1988
- Recorded: 1987—1988
- Studio: PWL (London)
- Genres: Pop; dance-pop
- Length: 38:20
- Label: RCA
- Producers: Stock Aitken Waterman; Rick Astley; Ian Curnow; Phil Harding; Daize Washbourn

Rick Astley chronology
Whenever You Need Somebody (1987)	Hold Me in Your Arms (1988)	Dance Mixes (1990)

Singles from Hold Me in Your Arms
- 1. "She Wants to Dance with Me" Released: 12 September 1988; 2. "Take Me to Your Heart" Released: 21 November 1988; 3. "Hold Me in Your Arms" Released: 30 January 1989; 4. "Giving Up on Love" Released: April 1989; 5. "Ain't Too Proud to Beg" Released: 7 August 1989

Hold Me in Your Arms is the second studio album by English singer Rick Astley, released on 26 November 1988 by RCA Records. It is the follow-up to his successful debut album Whenever You Need Somebody, and was his last album produced and written with the Stock Aitken Waterman team. It helped to continue Astley's commercial success, with it achieving Platinum and Gold certifications worldwide and three of the five singles from the album becoming Top 10 hits in the United Kingdom.

A remastered version of Hold Me in Your Arms, containing some remixes, was released on 12 April 2010. A 2023 remastered edition of the album was announced to be released on 12 May 2022, including a double CD album with the reimagined versions of "She Wants to Dance with Me" and "Hold Me in Your Arms" on the CD1 from his compilation album The Best of Me, also included with B-sides, instrumentals, and remixes for the CD2 and a blue limited edition vinyl.

== Background ==
Half of the tracks on Hold Me in Your Arms were written and produced by Stock Aitken Waterman and the other half were Astley's own compositions, produced by PWL associates Phil Harding, Ian Curnow and Daize Washbourn. The release of the album was delayed a few months due to a fire at PWL Studios which destroyed some of Astley's recorded material. This would be Astley's last album with Stock Aitken Waterman, due to Astley wanting to leave behind the dance-pop sound of the producers and wanting to shed his boy next door image. Astley wanted to focus on his original compositions for future albums, reappearing in 1991 with the soul album Free.

== Single releases ==
The album spawned five singles. Unlike his previous album, where all the singles were Stock Aitken Waterman compositions and productions, Astley's compositions were also released as singles. The lead single, "She Wants to Dance with Me", was Astley's first single that he wrote himself, and became a worldwide top 10 hit. In Europe, "Take Me to Your Heart" and "Hold Me in Your Arms" were released as the next singles. "Giving Up on Love" was released as the second single from the album in the US and Canada, and was later released in some countries of continental Europe as the fourth and last single from the album, and a cover of The Temptations' "Ain't Too Proud to Beg" was released as the third and last single in the US and Japan.

== Critical reception ==
A review in Pan-European magazine Music & Media stated that this album proves Astley can be a songwriter and a co-producer, added that "stylistically, the fabrication of carefree and functional dance hits is still the main objective", and considered "Giving Up On Love", "I Don't Want to Be Your Lover" and "Take Me to Your Heart" as the best tracks. Number One gave a very enthusiastic review: "We say hoorah! Some pundits say this sounds exactly like Rick's last disc, but this isn't a bad thing. It just means there's more swirling singalongs", citing "Take Me to Your Heart", "She Wants to Dance with Me" and "Ain't Too Proud to Beg". Stephen Thomas Erlewine of AllMusic deemed "apart from "She Wants to Dance With Me", Astley's second album didn't have songs as strong as those on his debut. Most of the album was pleasant dance-pop filler". A review in Music Week underlined "Hold Me in Your Arms", "Take Me to Your Heart" and "Ain't Too Proud to Beg" from the album, while stating the tracks "stick to the SAW formula".

Professional ratings
Review scores
Source	Rating
AllMusic	3/5 stars
Number One	5/5 stars
Rolling Stone	2/5 stars

== Track listing ==
All tracks are written by Rick Astley, except where noted.

Side one
No.	Title	Writer(s)	Length
1.	"She Wants to Dance with Me"		3:14
2.	"Take Me to Your Heart"	Stock Aitken Waterman	3:27
3.	"I Don't Want to Lose Her"	Stock Aitken Waterman	3:31
4.	"Giving Up on Love"		4:01
5.	"Ain't Too Proud to Beg"	Eddie Holland; Norman Whitfield	4:19

Side two
No.	Title	Writer(s)	Length
6.	"Till Then (Time Stands Still)"	Stock Aitken Waterman	3:14
7.	"Dial My Number"		4:09
8.	"I'll Never Let You Down"		3:55
9.	"I Don't Want to Be Your Lover"		3:58
10.	"Hold Me in Your Arms"		4:32
Total length:			38:20

2010 Deluxe Edition disc 1 bonus tracks
No.	Title	Writer(s)	Length
11.	"My Arms Keep Missing You"	Stock Aitken Waterman	3:14
12.	"I'll Be Fine"		3:44
13.	"She Wants to Dance with Me" (extended mix)		7:14
14.	"Take Me To Your Heart" (Autumn Leaves mix)	Stock Aitken Waterman	6:38
15.	"My Arms Keep Missing You" (The No L mix)	Stock Aitken Waterman	6:46
16.	"Hold Me in Your Arms" (extended mix)		7:37
17.	"Rick's Hit Mix" (megamix)	Stock Aitken Waterman; Astley	5:49

2010 Deluxe Edition disc 2: The Remixes
No.	Title	Writer(s)	Length
1.	"My Arms Keep Missing You" (The "Where's Harry?" Remix)	Stock Aitken Waterman	3:15
2.	"Giving Up on Love" (7" R&B mix)		4:07
3.	"She Wants to Dance With Me" (Bordering on a Collie Mix)		6:04
4.	"Giving Up on Love" (The Dick Dastardly Mix)		6:59
5.	"Hold Me in Your Arms" (Hold Me in Your Prayers Mix)		6:53
6.	"Giving Up on Love" (12" R&B extended mix)		7:08
7.	"My Arms Keep Missing You" (Bruno's Mix)	Stock Aitken Waterman	6:15
8.	"She Wants to Dance with Me" (US remix)		5:42
9.	"Giving Up on Love" (12" pop extended mix)		7:18
10.	"She Wants to Dance with Me" (Dave Ford remix)		5:00
11.	"My Arms Keep Missing You" (dub)	Stock Aitken Waterman	4:54
12.	"Giving Up on Love" (12" dub mix)		5:00
13.	"She Wants to Dance with Me" (instrumental)		4:53
14.	"Take Me To Your Heart" (instrumental)	Stock Aitken Waterman	3:27

2023 Remastered Deluxe Edition disc 1 bonus tracks
No.	Title	Length
11.	"I'll Be Fine"	3:47
12.	"She Wants to Dance with Me" (reimagined)	3:20
13.	"Hold Me in Your Arms" (reimagined)	3:43
14.	"Giving Up on Love" (7" R&B version)	4:05
15.	"Hold Me in Your Arms" (extended)	7:37

2023 Remastered Deluxe Edition disc 2
No.	Title	Writer(s)	Length
1.	"Take Me To Your Heart" (Autumn Leaves Mix)	Stock Aitken Waterman	6:40
2.	"Giving Up on Love" (12" pop extended)		7:19
3.	"She Wants to Dance With Me" (Bordering on a Collie Mix)		6:04
4.	"Take Me to Your Heart" (The Dick Dastardly Mix)	Stock Aitken Waterman	6:59
5.	"Giving Up on Love" (12" R&B extended mix)		7:18
6.	"She Wants to Dance with Me" (US remix)		5:43
7.	"Hold Me in Your Arms" (7" version)		4:22
8.	"Giving Up on Love" (12" dub mix)		4:53
9.	"She Wants to Dance with Me" (extended mix)		4:53
10.	"Hold Me in Your Arms" (Hold Me in Your Prayers Mix)		6:52
11.	"She Wants to Dance with Me" (Dave Ford mix)		7:10
12.	"Take Me To Your Heart" (instrumental)	Stock Aitken Waterman	3:29
13.	"She Wants to Dance with Me" (instrumental)		4:55

== Personnel ==
Adapted from AllMusic.

- Robert Ahwai – guitar
- Matt Aitken – guitar, keyboards, producer
- Rick Astley – drums, keyboards, lead vocals, producer, background vocals
- Gary Barnacle – saxophone
- Jason Barron – assistant
- Paul Cox – photography
- Ian Curnow – Fairlight, keyboards, producer, programming
- Steve Davies – assistant
- Peter Day – assistant
- Stewart Day – assistant
- George DeAngelis – keyboards
- Gordon Dennis – assistant
- Mike Duffy – engineer
- Dave Ford – mixing
- Les Spaine Jr – assistant
- Julian Gingell – assistant
- Peter Hammond – mixing
- Phil Harding – engineer, mixing, producer
- Karen Hewitt – engineer
- Tony King – assistant
- Shirley Lewis – background vocals
- A. Linn – drums
- Roddy Matthews – guitar
- Mainartery – sleeve design
- Chris McDonnell – assistant
- Mark McGuire – engineer
- Mae McKenna – background vocals
- Leroy Osbourne – background vocals
- Mike Stock – keyboards, producer, background vocals
- Philip Todd – saxophone
- Daize Washbourn – drums, keyboards, producer
- Pete Waterman – producer
- Yo-Yo – engineer

== Charts ==
=== Weekly charts ===
Weekly chart performance for Hold Me in Your Arms
Chart (1988–1989)	Peak position
Australian Albums (ARIA)	19
Austrian Albums (Ö3 Austria)	30
Canada Top Albums/CDs (RPM)	3
Dutch Albums (Album Top 100)	42
European Albums (Music & Media)	6
Finnish Albums (Suomen virallinen lista)	14
French Albums (IFOP)	28
German Albums (Offizielle Top 100)	3
Italian Albums (Musica e dischi)	5
New Zealand Albums (RMNZ)	28
Spanish Albums (AFYVE)	5
Swedish Albums (Sverigetopplistan)	7
Swiss Albums (Schweizer Hitparade)	11
UK Albums (Official Charts)	8
US Billboard 200	19

2023 weekly chart performance for Hold Me in Your Arms
Chart (2023)	Peak position
Belgian Albums (Ultratop Wallonia)	180

=== Year-end charts ===
1988 year-end chart performance for Hold Me in Your Arms
Chart (1988)	Position
UK Albums (Gallup)	54

1989 year-end chart performance for Hold Me in Your Arms
Chart (1989)	Position
Australian Albums (ARIA)	77
Canada Top Albums/CDs (RPM)	24
European Albums (Music & Media)	45
German Albums (Offizielle Top 100)	30
US Billboard 200	94

== Certifications ==
Certifications for Hold Me in Your Arms
Region	Certification	Certified units/sales
Australia (ARIA)	Platinum	70,000^{^}
Canada (Music Canada)	2× Platinum	200,000^{^}
Germany (BVMI)	Gold	250,000^{^}
Hong Kong (IFPI Hong Kong)	Platinum	20,000^{*}
Spain (Promusicae)	2× Platinum	200,000^{^}
Switzerland (IFPI Switzerland)	Gold	25,000^{^}
United Kingdom (BPI)	Platinum	300,000^{^}
United States (RIAA)	Gold	500,000^{^}
^{*} Sales figures based on certification alone.^{^} Shipments figures based on certification alone.
