= Every One of Us (song) =

Single by Rick Astley

from the album The Best of Me
- Released: 12 September 2019
- Recorded: 2018
- Length: 3:06
- Label: BMG
- Songwriter: Rick Astley
- Producer: Rick Astley

Rick Astley singles chronology
"Giant" (2019)	"Every One of Us" (2019)	"Love This Christmas" (2020)

Music videos
- "Every One of Us" on YouTube
- "Every One of Us" (Heroes edit) on YouTube

"Every One of Us" is a song by English singer and songwriter Rick Astley. It was released as a digital download in the United Kingdom on 12 September 2019 as the lead single from his greatest hits album The Best of Me (2019). The song was written and produced by Astley.

== Background ==
When talking about the song, Astley said in a press release, "It's about the fire in all of us. We all have something to give, even if it doesn't always feel like we do. I'm so lucky to feel that fire every time I'm on stage, and that helps me feel it in my everyday life too."

On 22 September 2020, Astley released a version of the song for the Unsung Heroes and Children in Need.

== Charts ==
Chart (2019)	Peak position
Belgium (Ultratip Bubbling Under Flanders)	27

== Release history ==
Region	Date	Format	Label
United Kingdom	12 September 2019	Digital download; streaming	BMG
