= Giving Up on Love =

Single by Rick Astley

from the album Hold Me in Your Arms
- B-side: "I'll Be Fine"
- Released: April 1989
- Recorded: 1988
- Genre: New jack swing
- Label: RCA
- Songwriter: Rick Astley
- Producers: Daize Washbourn; Rick Astley

Rick Astley singles chronology
"Hold Me in Your Arms" (1989)	"Giving Up on Love" (1989)	"Ain't Too Proud to Beg" (1989)

Music video
- "Giving Up on Love" on YouTube

"Giving Up on Love" is a song written and recorded by English singer-songwriter Rick Astley. It was produced by Daize Washbourn with Astley. The song was recorded for Astley's second album, Hold Me in Your Arms. The single peaked at number 38 in US Billboard charts. Never released as a single in the UK, this North American-only single was issued just prior to Astley's US tour. Celebrating the announcement of the Hold Me in Your Arms remastered edition studio album, the music video has been upgraded to 4K as of 28 April 2023. The single was also reissued as a digital EP on the same day.

== Versions ==
1. "Giving Up on Love" (7" pop mix) – 4:07
2. "Giving Up on Love" (12" pop extended mix) – 7:18
3. "Giving Up on Love" (7" R&B mix) – 4:07
4. "Giving Up on Love" (12" R&B extended mix) – 7:09
5. "Giving Up on Love" (12" dub mix) – 5:00

Digital EP

1. "Giving Up on Love" (2023 remaster) – 4:05
2. "Giving Up on Love" (7" R&B version) – 4:05
3. "Giving Up on Love" (12" pop extended) – 7:19
4. "Giving Up on Love" (12" dub mix) – 4:53

== Personnel ==
- Rick Astley – lead and backing vocals, keyboards, drums
- Daize Washbourn – keyboards, drums
- Roddy Matthews – guitars
- Shirley Lewis – backing vocals
- Mae McKenna – backing vocals
- Leroy Osborne – backing vocals
- Mike Stock – backing vocals

== Charts ==
Weekly chart performance for "Giving Up on Love"
Chart (1989)	Peak position
Canada Top Singles (RPM)	45
France (SNEP)	46
Quebec (ADISQ)	8
US Billboard Hot 100	38
US Adult Contemporary (Billboard)	11
