= She Wants to Dance with Me =

1988 single by Rick Astley

Single by Rick Astley

from the album Hold Me in Your Arms
- Released: 12 September 1988
- Recorded: 1988
- Genre: Synth-pop
- Length: 3:24
- Label: RCA
- Songwriter: Rick Astley
- Producers: Phil Harding; Ian Curnow

Rick Astley singles chronology
"It Would Take a Strong Strong Man" (1988)	"She Wants to Dance with Me" (1988)	"Take Me to Your Heart" (1988)

Alternative cover

Music video
- "She Wants to Dance with Me" on YouTube

"She Wants to Dance with Me" is a song written and recorded by English singer-songwriter Rick Astley, released as the lead single from his second studio album, Hold Me in Your Arms (1988). The song was released in United Kingdom on 12 September 1988 by RCA, and became an international success, peaking in the top ten in many countries, including Canada, where it topped the chart, and the US and the UK, where it reached number six. In 2019, Astley recorded and released a "reimagined" version of the song for his album The Best of Me.

== Composition ==
Astley was given the go-ahead to compose the first single from his second album, after rejecting producers Stock Aitken Waterman's intended lead track, "Nothing Can Divide Us", which was then given to Jason Donovan. The singer composed the track in the style of Whitney Houston's hit, "I Wanna Dance With Somebody (Who Loves Me)" in an effort to win the confidence of Pete Waterman, who was a huge fan of Houston's song.

The original recording of this song is performed in the key of F# major in a moderate tempo of 117 beats per minute. The song features simple synth riffs accompanied by a sparse drum machine pattern. The lyrics are about an unknown woman who is uninterested in "wild romance" and simply wants to dance with the narrator. "She Wants to Dance with Me" was Astley's first self-composed single that he released. Astley performed the song at the 1989 Grammy Awards, and he changed the lyrics to:

Now I know I've been out of touch, and I never meant to wear these clads oh so much (referencing his big suit look)

— Rick Astley at the 1989 Grammy Awards.

== Critical reception ==
A review in Pan-European magazine Music & Media presented the song like this: "Mr Disco with a simple but effective, self-written song". Sarah Champion from NME said, "What a voice! What looks! What a man!" Retrospectively, in 2025, Thomas Edward of Smooth Radio ranked the song number five in his list of "Rick Astley's 10 greatest songs, ever".

== Chart performance ==
In the UK, "She Wants to Dance with Me" debuted at number 16 on 24 September 1988, and reached number six, its highest position, three weeks later; it fell off the chart after ten weeks. In other European countries, the single was a major hit, culminating at number two in Finland and the Walloon region of Belgium, number three in the Flanders region of Belgium, number four in Denmark and Ireland, and number five in Spain. It was also a top-ten hit in Italy and the Netherlands where it attained number seven and eight, respectively, while in West Germany, it started at number 35 on 3 October 1988, climbed straight to a peak of number ten, a position it reached a second time three weeks later, and eventually spent 17 weeks on the chart. In addition, it rose to number 12 in Sweden and Switzerland, and number 16 in Iceland. On the Eurochart Hot 100 singles chart established by the Music & Media magazine, it entered at number 57 on 1 October 1988, attained number seven in its fifth week, and charted for a total of 14 weeks; it appeared for eight weeks on the European Airplay Top 50, two of them spent at number six.

"She Wants to Dance with Me" was also successful in North America. In the US, it peaked at number six on the Billboard Hot 100, thus becoming Astley's consecutive fourth top ten hit there, and at number 13 on the Hot Dance Club Play chart. The single was also Astley's fourth and final number-one hit in Canada, where it kicked off Paula Abdul's "Straight Up", and stayed at number one for two weeks. In Australia, it charted for 15 weeks in the top 50, and hit number 15 in its third week on the chart, while in New Zealand, it remained for ten weeks in the top 50 and achieved number ten. It reached number two in South Africa, where it charted for 17 weeks.

== Music video ==
Celebrating the announcement of the Hold Me in Your Arms remastered edition studio album, the music video has been upgraded to 4K as of 29 March 2023. The single was also reissued as a digital EP on the same day, which also includes the "reimagined" version from Astley's compilation album The Best of Me.

== Track listing ==
- 7" single
1. "She Wants to Dance with Me" – 3:24
2. "She Wants to Dance with Me" (instrumental) – 4:03
- 7" (USA) and mini CD single
1. "She Wants to Dance with Me" (Watermix) – 3:14
2. "She Wants to Dance with Me" (instrumental) – 4:03
- 12" maxi, CD and maxi cassette single
1. "She Wants to Dance with Me" (extended mix) – 7:14
2. "It Would Take a Strong Strong Man" (Matt's Jazzy Guitar mix) – 7:46
3. "She Wants to Dance with Me" (instrumental) – 4:03
- 12" single – Night & Day Remixes
1. "She Wants to Dance with Me" (Bordering on a Collie mix) – 6:04
2. "She Wants to Dance with Me" (remix) – 5:42
- 12" promo
1. "She Wants to Dance with Me" (Bordering on a Collie mix) – 6:05
2. "She Wants to Dance with Me" (album version) – 3:42
- Digital EP
1. "She Wants to Dance with Me" (2023 remaster) – 3:18
2. "She Wants to Dance with Me" (reimagined) – 3:20
3. "She Wants to Dance with Me" (US remix) – 5:43
4. "She Wants to Dance with Me" (Dave Ford remix) – 5:04

== Personnel ==
- Rick Astley – lead vocals
- Ian Curnow – keyboards, Fairlight programming
- Robert Ahwai – guitars
- Phil Todd – saxophone
- Shirley Lewis – backing vocals
- Mae McKenna – backing vocals
- Leroy Osborne – backing vocals
- Mike Stock – backing vocals

== Charts ==
=== Weekly charts ===
Weekly chart performance for "She Wants to Dance with Me"
Chart (1988–1989)	Peak position
Australia (ARIA)	15
Belgium (Ultratop 50 Flanders)	3
Belgium (Ultratop 50 Wallonia)	2
Canada Retail Singles (The Record)	1
Canada Top Singles (RPM)	1
Denmark (IFPI)	4
Ecuador (Ecuadorian Singles Chart)	1
Europe (European Hot 100)	7
Europe (European Airplay Top 50)	6
Finland (Suomen virallinen lista)	2
Iceland (RÚV)	16
Ireland (IRMA)	4
Italy (Musica e dischi)	7
Luxembourg (Radio Luxembourg)	5
Netherlands (Dutch Top 40)	12
Netherlands (Single Top 100)	8
New Zealand (Recorded Music NZ)	10
Quebec (ADISQ)	4
South Africa (Springbok Radio)	2
Spain (AFYVE)	5
Sweden (Sverigetopplistan)	12
Switzerland (Schweizer Hitparade)	12
UK Singles (Official Charts)	6
UK Dance (Music Week)	4
US Billboard Hot 100	6
US Adult Contemporary (Billboard)	5
US Dance Club Songs (Billboard)	13
West Germany (GfK)	10

=== Year-end charts ===
1988 year-end chart performance for "She Wants to Dance with Me"
Chart (1988)	Position
Belgium (Ultratop 50 Flanders)	62
Europe (European Hot 100 Singles)	77

1989 year-end chart performance for "She Wants to Dance with Me"
Chart (1989)	Position
Canada Top Singles (RPM)	44
US Billboard Hot 100	88
