= Rick Astley =

English singer (born 1966)

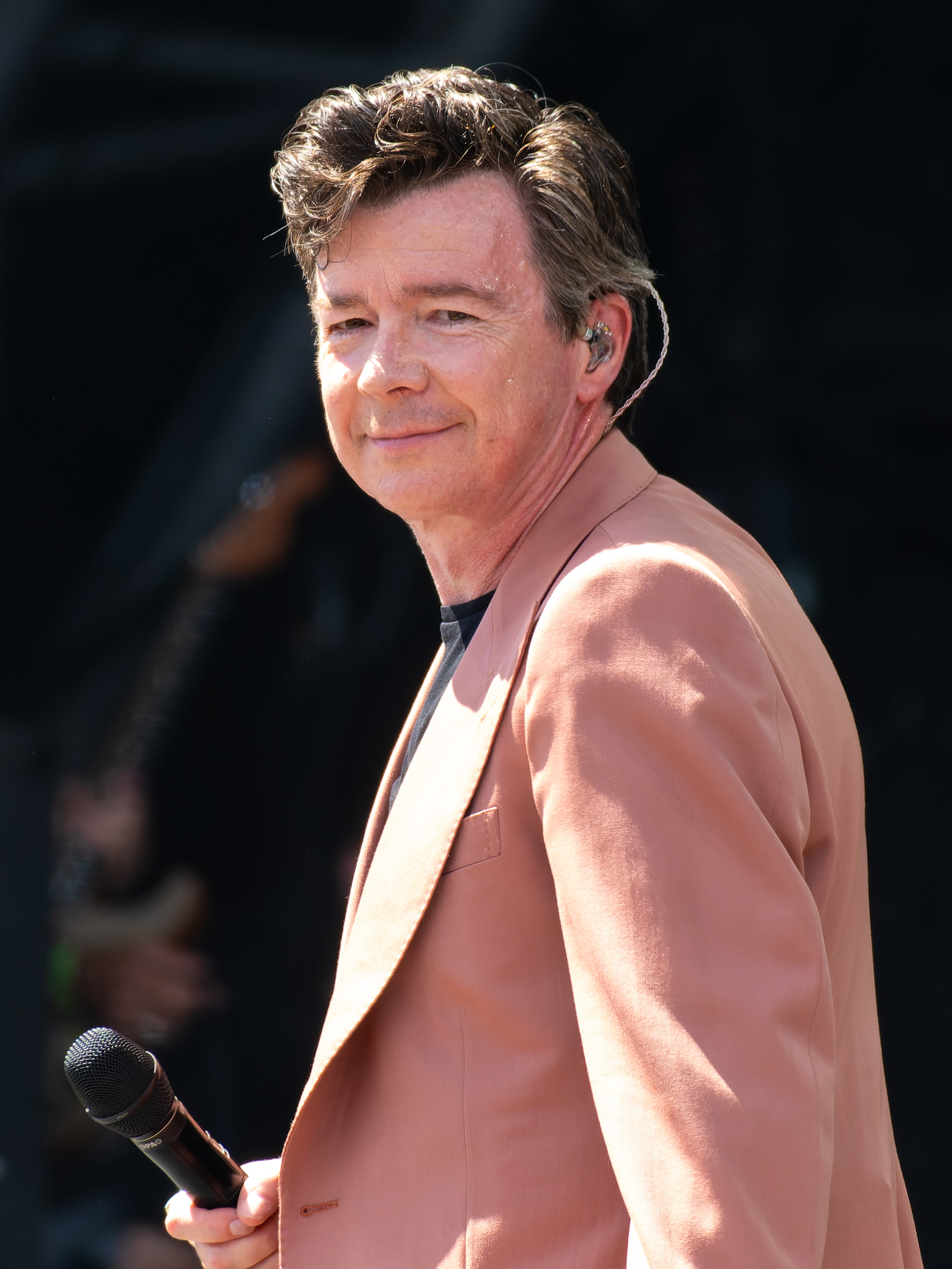
- Astley in 2023
- Born: Richard Paul Astley; 6 February 1966 (age 60); Newton-le-Willows, Lancashire, England
- Occupations: Singer; songwriter; radio personality
- Years active: 1985–1993; 2000–present
- Spouse: Lene Bausager (m. 2013)
- Children: 1
- Musical career
- Genres: Pop; dance-pop; blue-eyed soul
- Instruments: Vocals; drums; guitar
- Works: Discography
- Labels: PWL; RCA; Polydor
- Website: rickastley.co.uk

Richard Paul Astley (born 6 February 1966) is an English singer, songwriter, radio DJ and podcaster. He gained fame through his association with the production trio Stock Aitken Waterman, releasing the 1987 album Whenever You Need Somebody, which sold 15 million copies worldwide and was certified platinum by both the BPI and the RIAA. His debut single "Never Gonna Give You Up" was a No. 1 hit in more than 25 countries, winning the 1988 Brit Award for Best British Single. The song also stayed at the top of the UK chart for five weeks in 1987 and was the best-selling single of that year. His 1988 single "Together Forever" also topped the US Billboard Hot 100 and was one of his eight songs to reach the UK Singles Chart top 10.

In 1988, Astley followed up his debut album with Hold Me in Your Arms which achieved platinum and gold certifications internationally. The lead single "She Wants to Dance with Me" became a worldwide top 10 hit. In 1991, he left Stock Aitken Waterman and moved his musical direction towards soul, which he explored on his other albums. His 1991 single "Cry for Help" was his last single to reach the top 10 in either the US or UK. In 1993, he retired from music to focus on spending time with his partner and daughter. He returned to the music industry in 2000 and released 50 to celebrate his 50th birthday in 2016, with the album debuting in the UK at No. 1. His most recent studio album Are We There Yet? was released in 2023.

Astley has sold approximately 40 million records worldwide and was nominated in 1989 for a Grammy Award for Best New Artist but lost to Tracy Chapman. During the period between his debut release and his fifth single, Astley outsold every other artist in the world. In the United Kingdom, Astley was also in the top 40 every week for the first six months of his career. He became an internet phenomenon in 2007 following the emergence of the Rickrolling meme, which utilizes the music video for "Never Gonna Give You Up", and his career was revitalised by the meme's popularity. A year after the Rickrolling meme began, he was voted "Best Act Ever" at the MTV Europe Music Awards 2008. On 28 July 2021, "Never Gonna Give You Up" became the fourth 1980s song to reach one billion views on YouTube. (Note: Behind "Billie Jean" by Michael Jackson, "Take On Me" by A-ha and "Sweet Child o' Mine" by Guns N' Roses.)

== Early life ==
Richard Paul Astley was born on 6 February 1966 in Newton-le-Willows, Lancashire, the fourth child of Horace and Cynthia Astley. His parents divorced when he was 5 and Astley was brought up by his father who was "really, really pissed off a lot of the time... but he was great as well, he was really loving". Rick remained in very close contact with his mother, who lived a few streets away. Describing his childhood, Astley stated "There was definitely an element of 'There's something very wrong in this family.' I can't even say I've got these exact memories of it, I just know it was a bit odd."

Astley would also later recall that his worst childhood memory was "Walking in the kitchen and seeing my dad with his hands around my mum's neck. After something like that, things get broken and destroyed in your emotional and mental make-up. It was not Walt Disney; it was not what's supposed to happen. Shouting and arguing is bad enough, but for me something [broke] that day. Everything about it terrified me and just completely flipped me out. No kid should ever see that." In an interview ahead of the publication of his autobiography, Astley said "I think it did form me as a person, definitely, and formed a lot of my choices of why I went into music and why I wanted to be on a stage and why I wanted people's attention – because I don't think I got enough attention from my parents."

When he was 10, Astley began singing in a local church choir, which began his love of music. During his schooldays, Astley played the drums in a number of local bands, where he met guitarist David Morris. After leaving school at 16, Astley was employed during the day as a driver in his father's market-gardening business and played drums on the Northern club circuit at night in bands such as Give Way – specialising in covering Beatles and Shadows songs – and FBI, which won several local talent competitions.

== Career ==
=== 1985–1986: Signing with Stock Aitken Waterman ===
In 1985, Astley was performing as a drummer for the soul band FBI, with Morris on guitar. They were a well-known local band, gigging in pubs and clubs. When FBI's lead singer left the band and Morris left to concentrate on his career in hairdressing, Astley offered to be the lead vocalist. That was when he was noticed by the record producer Pete Waterman at a Warrington nightclub, who offered him the opportunity to come to London to work at the Pete Waterman Limited (PWL) recording studio with RCA Records publishing his records. Although Astley initially turned down Waterman's proposal, several months later he accepted the offer and moved into Waterman's London flat. SAW also hired most of FBI, including Morris as a guitarist/songwriter.

Under the tutelage of the production team of Mike Stock, Matt Aitken, and Waterman, known as Stock Aitken Waterman (SAW), Astley was taught about the recording process and groomed for his future career, starting off as the recording studio "tea boy", an apprenticeship that lasted two years. The reason for Astley to be hired as a "tape op" was to overcome his shyness. Reflecting on this time, Astley said: "I was seeing other people have No. 1 hits, and I'd think: 'Come on, boys'. But it wasn't that they had forgotten me, they just had a lot of records to make. I knew, though, that when I got my turn, it would be a big thing, because Stock Aitken Waterman were becoming this big hit machine."

=== 1987–1989: Success ===
In March 1987, Astley contributed vocals to "Let It Be" which was recorded by charity supergroup Ferry Aid. The single topped the UK Singles Chart for three weeks and was certified gold for shipping over 500,000 copies. It was also a No. 1 hit in Norway and Switzerland. Astley's first single was "When You Gonna", released as a duet between Astley and singer Lisa Fabien; the song was produced by Phil Harding and Ian Curnow. It was released in May 1987, and with no promotion managed to chart at No. 17 in the Netherlands and No. 20 in Belgium. It also charted on the US Billboard Dance Club Songs chart at No. 11.

"We were at a stage early on with Rick, when no one knew quite what to do with him," recalled Harding. "The idea was to make him happen in the clubs... but the song opened up the doors for him at Capital Radio." Astley had also contributed to another duet with O'Chi Brown, "Learning to Live (Without Your Love)" for her 1986 album, O'Chi. Astley was uncredited on the album and received no royalties. The song was belatedly released as a cash-in single in October 1987. The song failed to chart on the UK Singles Chart. The two singers never met, and Brown first heard Astley's vocal when she was given a copy of her album.

Astley's first solo offering was "Never Gonna Give You Up", recorded on New Year's Day 1987, and released nearly seven months later, on 27 July. "At first, Pete felt we should do a Motown cover," said Mike Stock. "The first thing we recorded was The Temptations' "Ain't Too Proud to Beg" and that's when I first properly heard his voice. I said to Pete and Matt that singing a cover would be to underplay and undervalue his undoubted vocal strengths, and that we should write Rick his own song. That's when we came up with Never Gonna Give You Up." The concept for the song was suggested by Waterman after Astley spoke to him of his devotion to his then girlfriend, with the song's tune, chords and lyrics composed by Stock and Matt Aitken.

Mike Stock stated that the Colonel Abrams hit "Trapped" (1985) was a big influence on "Never Gonna Give You Up", saying: "For Rick Astley's song I didn't want it to sound like Kylie or Bananarama so I looked at the Colonel Abrams track 'Trapped' and recreated that syncopated bassline in a way that suited our song." Initial mixing was done by Phil Harding, with the song's distinctive synthetic string and brass lines later added by Fairlight operator Ian Curnow. The final mix was provided by PWL remixer Pete Hammond, who made the vocals more prominent. His completed extended mix was edited down by Stock and Aitken to become the radio version.

Although his producers were initially unenthusiastic about the track, his distinctive rich, deep voice combined with dance-pop made the song an immediate success, spending five weeks at the top of the British charts and becoming the year's highest-selling single. The song was also a worldwide No. 1 hit, topping the charts in 24 other countries, including the United States, Australia, and West Germany. The single reached the No. 1 spot on the year-end singles charts in both the United Kingdom and South Africa. "Never Gonna Give You Up" won Best British Single at the 1988 BPI Awards (now called the BRIT Awards), and Astley performed it in front of a global audience of 100 million. Assessing the status of the track as producers Stock Aitken Waterman's biggest and most enduring hit, Stock confessed he struggled to completely understand why the song had struck such a chord, but suggested its massive success was down to a combination of the song, the singer, and the international clout of record label RCA.

Astley's next single was "Whenever You Need Somebody", which was released in October 1987. The single was a recycled Stock Aitken Waterman song, originally recorded by O'Chi Brown in 1985, which Stock said was resurrected in the rush to gather strong follow up material in the wake of Astley's unexpectedly huge global success. Astley's version of "Whenever You Need Somebody" was a major hit on the charts--a Top 5 hit in almost all the countries where it was released. It became successful in Europe, reaching No. 1 in seven countries, including West Germany and Sweden. It also reached No. 3 in the United Kingdom, a position it held for three weeks. Though not released as a single in America, it was released in Canada. Discussing Astley's success with the track, Brown complimented the singer on his voice and praised the chart performance of his cover.

In November 1987, the album Whenever You Need Somebody, containing four tracks written by Astley, reached No. 1 in both Britain and Australia and No. 10 in America. It was certified 4× Platinum in England and Canada, and 2× Platinum in America. It is Astley's most best-selling album and it sold 15.2 million copies worldwide, making Astley the top-selling British act of the year. The album is listed as the 136th best-selling album in Spain, and was the seventh best-selling album of 1987 in the United Kingdom. Alex Henderson of AllMusic stated that SAW "should definitely be proud of their work" on this "often captivating debut album" which "proved [the singer] to be a welcome addition to the British R&B scene"; he added that the "music approach is very much a production of the '70s" and highlighted tracks like "Together Forever", "Never Gonna Give You Up" and "Don't Say Goodbye".

In December 1987, Astley released a cover version of the Nat King Cole classic "When I Fall in Love". Rivals EMI, hoping to see their act the Pet Shop Boys become UK Christmas No. 1, re-released Cole's version. That led to a slowdown of purchases of Astley's version, allowing the Pet Shop Boys to reach the top spot with their cover version of "Always on My Mind". "When I Fall in Love" sold over 200,000 copies and gained a Silver certification from the BPI; it also peaked in the UK at No. 2 for two weeks. The second half of the double A-side single was a dance number, "My Arms Keep Missing You", which was released as an independent single in Germany and reached No. 6.

Astley's fourth single release was "Together Forever" in January 1988, reaching No. 2 in the UK. It was denied the top spot by Kylie Minogue's debut "I Should Be So Lucky", which reached No. 1 following her successful role as Charlene Robinson in Neighbours. "Together Forever" was more successful in America, topping the charts. It also topped the charts in Canada, Ireland and Spain, and was a Top 10 hit in many European countries. His fifth and final release from his debut album was "It Would Take a Strong Strong Man". It was mainly intended for the American market and was not released in the United Kingdom and most of Europe. It was another hit, reaching No. 10 on the US Billboard Hot 100 and No. 1 in Canada. The B-side "You Move Me" written by Astley was featured in the movie Cocktail.

Production of the singer's follow up album was complicated when a distressed Astley rejected the set's intended first single, "Nothing Can Divide Us"—a track the producers then gave to Jason Donovan. Wishing to placate an unhappy Astley, producer Pete Waterman allowed him to start work with other writers and producers under the PWL umbrella, but a fire in the PWL studios destroyed much of Astley's new material, causing a delay in the release of his second album. Hold Me in Your Arms was released in January 1989. It contained five singles and reached No. 8 in the UK and No. 19 in the US, achieving Platinum and Gold certifications worldwide. Number One gave a very enthusiastic review of the album: "We say hoorah! Some pundits say this sounds exactly like Rick's last disc, but this isn't a bad thing. It just means there's more swirling singalongs". Astley's relationship with British media deteriorated significantly after the release of Hold Me in Your Arms, with the media calling him a "puppet" of Stock Aitken Waterman, although Astley had written five of his new album's tracks. The negative press affected the sales of his singles.

The first single from the album was "She Wants to Dance with Me", written by Astley. He composed the track in the style of Whitney Houston's hit, "I Wanna Dance With Somebody (Who Loves Me)" in an effort to win the confidence of Waterman, who was a fan of Houston's song. It was another international success, peaking in the Top 10 in many countries, including Canada, where it topped the chart, and the US and the UK, where it reached No. 6. "Take Me to Your Heart" was the next single to be released from the album. It was a success on the UK Singles Chart where it peaked at No. 8 and it was also a Top 10 and 20 hit in many other European countries. It was one of four songs written and produced by Stock Aitken Waterman that were belatedly added to the album in order to help Astley make his release deadline following the fire. The four tracks were written and produced in just two days, with writer Matt Aitken confirming "Take Me to Your Heart" was inspired by house music act Inner City's 1988 hit, "Big Fun".

"Hold Me in Your Arms", a ballad written by Astley, reached No. 10 in the UK and was also not released in North America. The next two singles released from the album were intended for the North American market. "Giving Up on Love" and a cover of The Temptations song "Ain't Too Proud to Beg" charted at No. 38 and No. 89 in the US respectively. In December 1989, Astley set off on his first world tour, touring 15 countries including the UK, US, Australia, and Japan. By the end of the tour, he was tired of the negative press and wanted to explore alternative paths as a musician. He left Stock Aitken Waterman and RCA Records bought out his contract with PWL.

=== 1990–1993: Switch to adult contemporary and career break ===
By 1990, Astley decided to leave dance-pop and move towards soul. The shift in musical genre led him to change his image, ditching the boy next door look, growing his hair, and presenting himself as a mature and passionate musician. His third album, Free, was released in 1991 and contained collaborations with Elton John. It had three singles and reached No. 9 in the UK and No. 31 in the US. Astley achieved one more major success with his 1991 ballad "Cry for Help", which reached No. 7 on both the UK Singles Chart and the US Billboard Hot 100. It also reached No. 4 in Canada and was a No. 1 hit on both the US and Canadian Adult Contemporary charts. The song's accompanying music video received heavy rotation on MTV Europe. "Cry for Help" was awarded one of BMI's Pop Awards in 1993, honoring the songwriters, composers and music publishers of the song.

The other two singles from Free were not as successful; "Move Right Out" reached No. 58 in the UK and No. 81 in the US, and "Never Knew Love" reached No. 70 in the UK and did not chart in the US. Free marked the end of Astley's successful four-year period, and "Cry for Help" was the last Astley single to make the Top 10 in either the UK or US. Astley's next album, Body and Soul, was released in 1993 and was largely an Adult Contemporary album. By the time the album was released, Astley had decided to retire from the music industry. As a result, the album did not get much promotion; it did not chart in the UK but managed to make the Billboard 200, peaking at No. 182.

The two singles, "The Ones You Love" and "Hopelessly", performed very well on the US Adult Contemporary chart, peaking at No. 19 and No. 4 respectively. "The Ones You Love" peaked at No. 48 in the UK but did not chart in the US. "Hopelessly" crossed over and peaked at No. 28 on the US Billboard Hot 100, staying in the US Top 40 for five weeks, and No. 33 in the UK. It was the last hit to chart on the Top 40 in either the UK or US. It was named as one of the most performed songs at the 1994 BMI Awards, and is one of the few songs to achieve BMI "Million-Air" status.

=== 1994–2000: Retirement ===
Astley retired from the music industry in 1993 at the age of 27, deciding that family life was more important to him; "Now it doesn't seem like any amount of years, but then it was a quarter of my life. I was a young guy and I was like, 'I don't want to be doing that every single day of my life. I want to hang out with my friends. I've made a lot of money. I want to spend some of it. I want to do the things I want to do."

During his time out of the music business, his daughter Emilie (born in 1992) grew up. For the rest of the 1990s and early-2000s, Astley remained out of the public eye. He said later this was due to his growing frustration with the business side of things; he compared his life as a pop star to being "more like a travelling salesman than a musician or performer". During that period he co-wrote "Mission Statement", a track for former Marillion singer Fish's 1999 solo album Raingods with Zippos.

=== 2000–2020: Return to singing and renewed success ===
Seven years after Body and Soul, Astley returned to the music industry, signing a co-publishing deal with Polydor and recording a new album, Keep It Turned On, between November 2000 and September 2001, and released in late 2001. The album featured the single "Sleeping", which became a minor club hit, thanks to a set of remixes from the US house producer Todd Terry. Keep It Turned On was only released in Continental Europe. Astley's first compilation album, Greatest Hits, was released in 2002, and reached No. 16 on the UK Albums Chart. With no promotion from him, it sold over 100,000 copies and was certified Gold by the British Phonographic Industry. In 2003, Astley charted at No. 10 in the UK as a songwriter with "Shakespeare's (Way With) Words" performed by short-lived boy band One True Voice. In 2004, Astley toured for the first time in fourteen years, which led him to a record contract with Sony BMG.

In March 2005, Astley released the album Portrait, in which he covered many classic standards such as "Vincent", "Nature Boy" and "Close to You". Astley and Sony BMG were unhappy with the result, so the album was poorly promoted, yet it managed to reach No. 26 on the UK Albums Chart. In April 2008, the album The Ultimate Collection: Rick Astley was released by Sony BMG, and by May it had reached No. 17 on the UK Top 40 Albums Chart, again with no promotion by Astley.

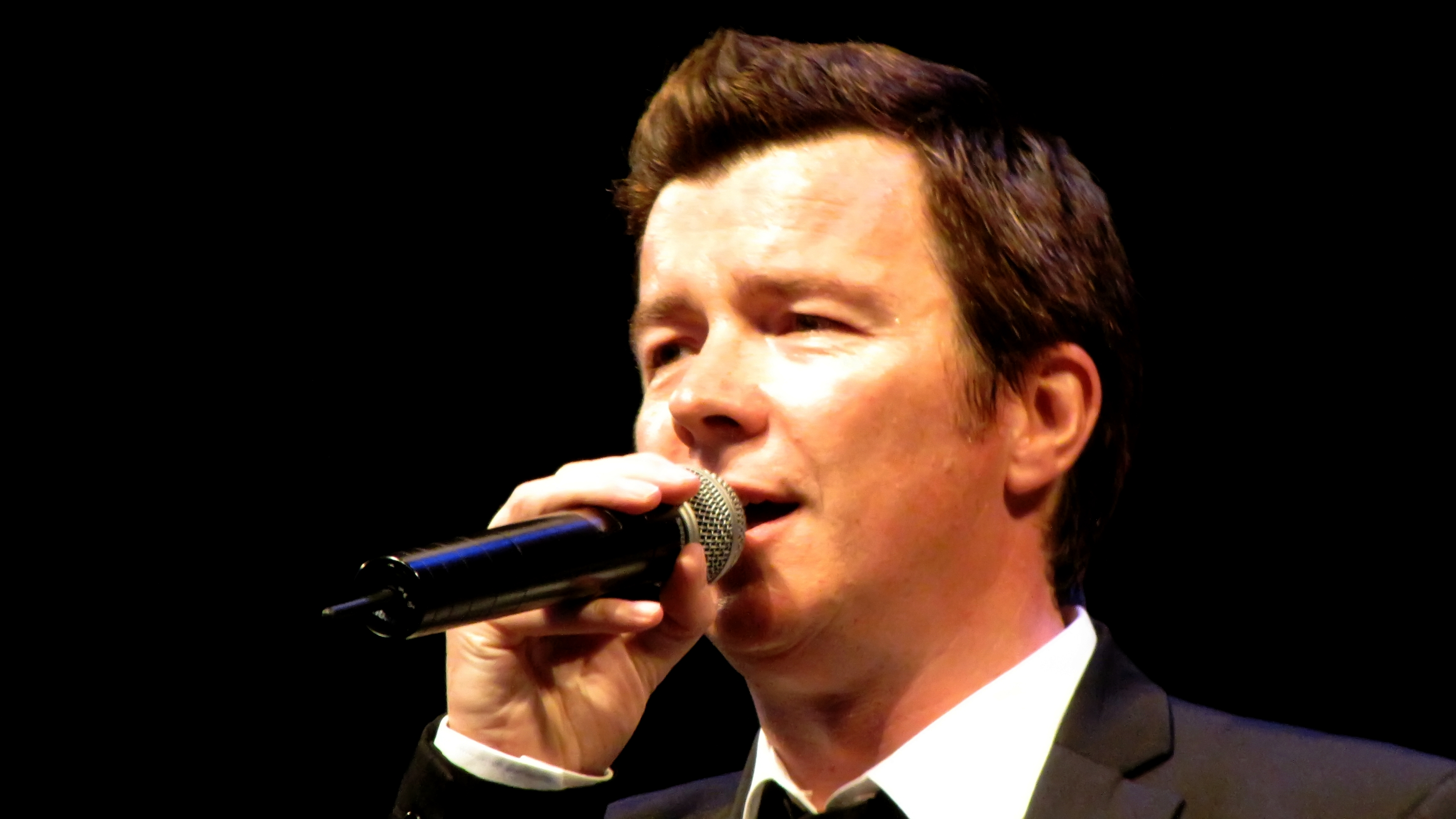
Astley performing in Copenhagen, Denmark, July 2009

In September 2008, Astley was nominated for the "Best Act Ever" award at the MTV Europe Music Awards. The push to make him the winner of the award continued after the announcement, as did efforts to encourage MTV to invite Astley to the awards ceremony. On 7 November, following a massive Internet campaign by fans, Astley won the award in Liverpool but was not there in person to receive it. Perez Hilton collected the prize on his behalf. On the back of this, "Never Gonna Give You Up" (which had recently become an Internet meme via Rickrolling) returned to the UK charts, peaking at No. 73 during the Christmas period. Astley continued touring across the globe and, in 2008, performed in the Here and Now Tour which featured various other 1980s acts such as Boy George and Belinda Carlisle. In April 2009, he wrote an article for Time about moot.

Astley was a special guest throughout Peter Kay's new tour, The Tour That Doesn't Tour Tour...Now On Tour, from 27 April to 22 May 2010. To mark the occasion, Astley released a new single, "Lights Out", on his own label on 7 June 2010. It was his first release in the UK Singles Chart in seventeen years. It was well received by radio, peaking at No. 15 on the UK Airplay Charts, but failed to become a commercial hit, reaching only No. 97 on the UK Singles Chart.

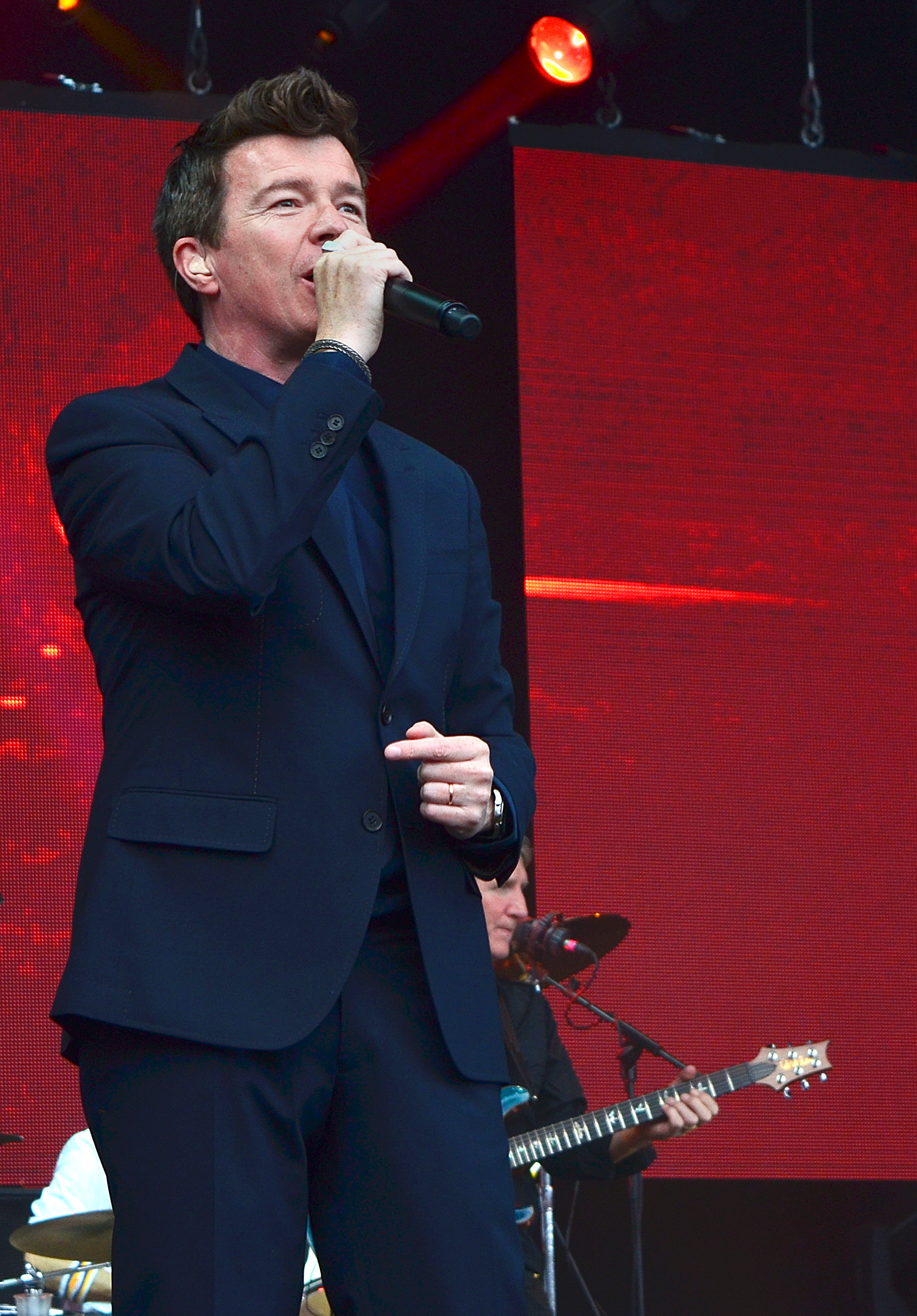
Astley performing at Bristol, June 2014

During the summer of 2010, Astley became a radio DJ for London's Magic FM, presenting a Sunday show. The initial contract was for eight weeks, but he proved popular with listeners and his contract was extended till the end of the year. In December 2010, Astley co-hosted the Chris Evans Breakfast Show on BBC Radio 2 with Peter Kay, and in March 2011 appeared in Comic Relief's Red Nose Day telethon on the BBC.

In April 2016, Astley released "Keep Singing", from his forthcoming album 50 which was released on 10 June 2016 by BMG. Interviewed by Amanda Holden on the Lorraine show on 7 April, Astley stated that turning 50 had prompted him to release the single. He said, "It was a big milestone. I got back in the studio and friends were telling me the material I was working on was pretty good. So I decided to go for it." The album reached No. 1 on the Official UK Album Sales charts in the week of 17 June to 23 June 2016. On 30 June 2017, Astley announced on his Twitter account that 50 had been certified Platinum in the United Kingdom (300,000 and more albums sold).

In September 2016, Astley released the single "Dance", together with an official video. On 1 June 2018, Astley posted a video on Twitter announcing his upcoming album Beautiful Life which was released on 13 July. Astley did a tour, the #BeautifulLife Tour, and tickets were first available for purchase to anyone who pre-ordered the album. Beautiful Life peaked at No. 6 on the UK Albums Chart. In 2019, Astley served as the support act on Take That's Greatest Hits Live 38-date tour in Britain and Ireland. He is also an occasional guest vocalist at Foo Fighters concerts, and has previously performed with A-ha and Kylie Minogue.

Astley and the Foo Fighters both performed at the Summer Sonic Festival in Japan. The band invited Astley to join them as they performed "Never Gonna Give You Up" in the style of "Smells Like Teen Spirit". Astley and Foo Fighters leader Dave Grohl became friends and he performed with the band at the California Jam rock festival.

During live performances where he sings "Never Gonna Give You Up", Astley sometimes shouts out to the audience that he is feeling "bloody marvellous" or that he is feeling "fantastic" to have some banter with the audience. On 12 October 2019, Astley appeared on CBeebies Bedtime Stories. On 25 October, he released a greatest hits album, The Best of Me. The album includes the single "Every One of Us", which was released in September 2019. The Best of Me reached No. 4 on the UK Albums Chart and No. 1 on the UK Independent Albums chart.

=== 2020–present: Covers and Are We There Yet? ===
In June 2020, towards the end of the nationwide lockdown in England due to the COVID-19 pandemic, Astley released four cover songs: "Ain't No Sunshine" by Bill Withers, "Everlong" by Foo Fighters, "Titanium" by David Guetta, and "Better Now" by Post Malone. Around that time, Astley made a TikTok account, launching it with a video of him dancing to "Never Gonna Give You Up" which received millions of views. On 30 November 2020, Astley released a single, "Love This Christmas", the video featuring Astley performing amid a flurry of snow and dancing snowmen. To accompany the single, he launched a signed limited edition Christmas card, with all proceeds going to the Shooting Stars Children's Hospices. On 7 April 2021, Astley released a single, "Unwanted", inspired by the era and vibes of the original podcast.

On 2 September 2021, amid the news that ABBA had reunited, Astley released a cover of their song "The Winner Takes It All". That month, he and the band Blossoms performed two concerts of covers by the Smiths, who had disbanded in the 1980s. The Guardian gave one performance four out of five, writing that "the ultimate Smiths karaoke shouldn't work, but it does". Astley and Blossoms performed again at the 2023 Glastonbury Festival. The Guardian gave the performances positive reviews, suggesting that they offered fans a way to enjoy the Smiths without the "moral queasiness" of the Smiths singer Morrissey, who had become a controversial figure in the preceding years. Astley said he performed "from a place of absolute joy and love for those songs". He also played a solo set at Glastonbury that year, his first appearance there.

Morrissey thanked Blossoms and Astley on his website, writing: "Anything that generates interest in that tired old Smiths warhorse is testimony to the wallop it packed." Johnny Marr described the performances as "funny and horrible at the same time" and said he had not been informed they were happening. He said later he had "dealt with it". In response to Marr, Astley said: "It's his work and his life, but it doesn't seem like [the Smiths] are ever getting back together ... It's a difficult one, but I did it from a place of absolute joy and love for those songs."

In October 2023, Astley released Are We There Yet?, his first album of new music since 2018's Beautiful Life. Inspired by soul music, it debuted at No. 2 on the UK Albums Chart. Astley's autobiography, Never: The Autobiography, was released on 10 October 2024. The book received positive reviews from critics with John Aizlewood from i calling it a "nuanced memoir" and a "revelation".

In March 2025, Rick Astley uploaded a cover of Chappell Roan's popular song "Pink Pony Club" to his YouTube channel.

In July 2025, Astley was honored at the Silver Clef Awards being given the Outstanding Achievement Award.

On 6 February 2026, his 60th birthday, Astley released the single "Waiting on You". This was followed by "Raindrops", a single released in April 2026.

Astley started the Reflection Tour on 10 April 2026 at the OVO Hydro in Glasgow.

== Legacy ==
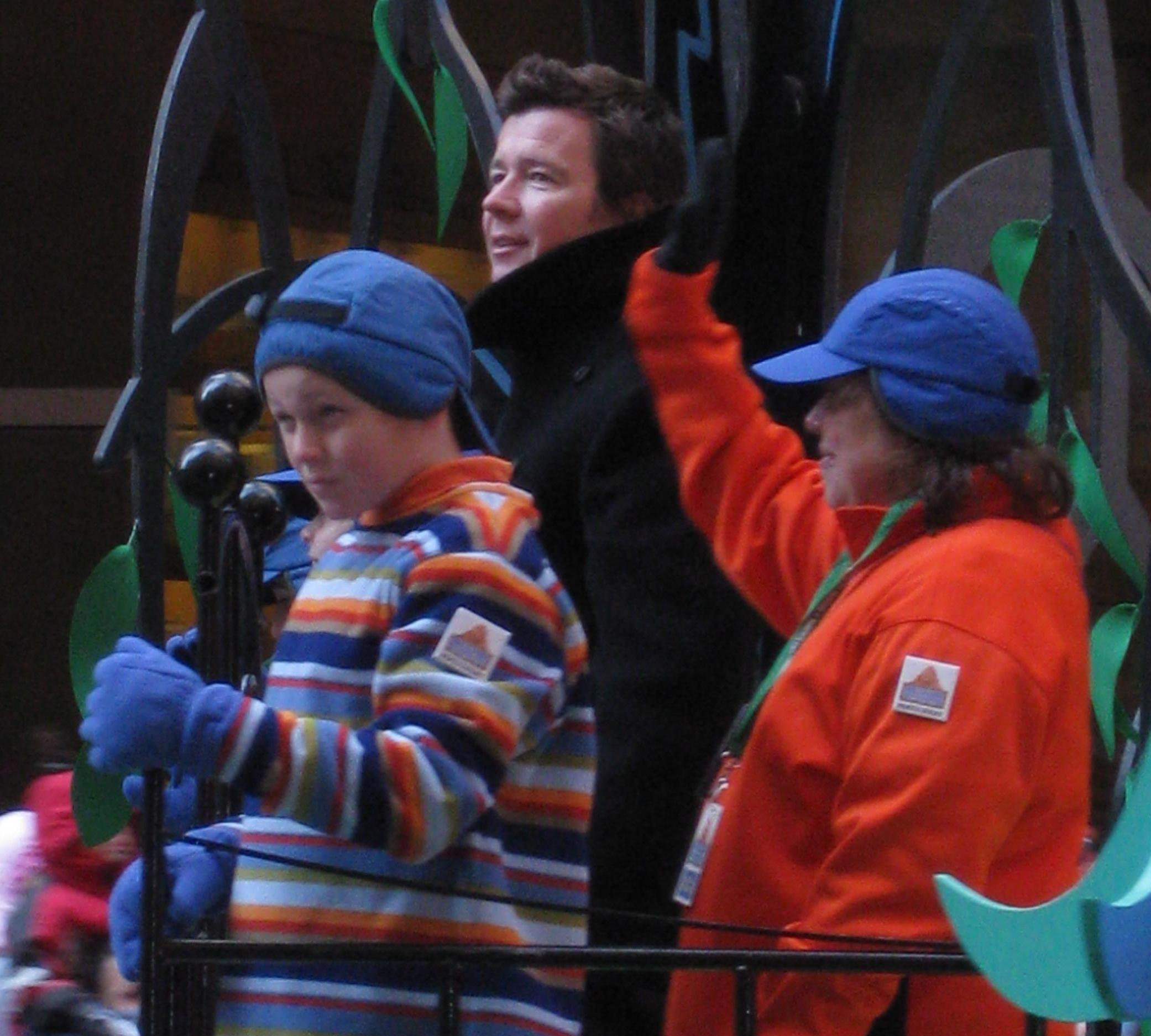
Astley rickrolling the 2008 Macy's Thanksgiving Day Parade

In 2007, Astley became the subject of a viral Internet meme known as rickrolling. The meme is a type of bait and switch using a disguised hyperlink that leads to the "Never Gonna Give You Up" music video. When victims click on a seemingly unrelated link, the site with the music video loads instead of what was expected and in doing so they are said to have been "rickrolled". The meme has also extended to using the song's lyrics in unexpected places. The meme gained mainstream attention in 2008 through several publicized events, particularly when YouTube used it on its 2008 April Fools' Day event. Rickrolling saw a massive resurgence online in the early 2020s. In online classes on Zoom during the worldwide COVID-19 lockdown, students often rickrolled their classmates and teachers. A 4K remaster of the "Never Gonna Give You Up" music video went viral in early 2021.

Initially, Astley, who had only recently returned to performing after a 10-year hiatus, was hesitant about using his newfound popularity from the meme to further his career, but accepted the fame when he rickrolled the 2008 Macy's Thanksgiving Day Parade with a surprise performance of the song. Since then, he has seen his performance career revitalised by the meme's popularity. In an interview, Astley stated that one of his favourite rickroll videos is "BarackRoll", a rickroll featuring clips from rallies by Barack Obama during his 2008 presidential campaign, edited to make it look as though he is singing "Never Gonna Give You Up".

Astley himself has been rickrolled a few times; the first time pre-dated the viral phenomenon. In an interview with Larry King, Astley says that the first time he fell for the prank was through an email his friend sent him during the early 2000s. On a Reddit post in June 2020, a user claimed to have met Astley backstage when they were 12 years old, but the user posted a link to the song instead of a picture verifying the encounter. Astley later confirmed he had been tricked into clicking the link. The post became the most-upvoted post of 2020 on Reddit.

== Personal life ==
Astley has been married to film producer Lene Bausager since 2013. They met when she was working as a promoter with RCA in 1987, and she is now a film producer. Their daughter has a master's degree in fine art and is a garden designer. Astley and his wife live in the Surrey town of Molesey and their daughter lives in Denmark. He maintains a home recording studio and has a collection of guitars. Some of Astley's personal interests include building sheds and travelling via car, once stating that he drove from New York to Los Angeles just for the fun of it.

In 2017, Astley partnered with Mikkeller, a Danish brewery, opening two pubs over the following years in Islington and Shoreditch, London. In January 2023, Astley sued Yung Gravy over vocal imitations on Gravy's song "Betty (Get Money)". Astley said that it was a violation of his "right of publicity", and the case was settled in September 2023. Also in 2023, Astley said on This Morning that he is experiencing hearing loss and now wears hearing aids.

== Discography ==
- Whenever You Need Somebody (1987)
- Hold Me in Your Arms (1988)
- Free (1991)
- Body & Soul (1993)
- Keep It Turned On (2001)
- Portrait (2005)
- 50 (2016)
- Beautiful Life (2018)
- Are We There Yet? (2023)

== See also ==
- List of artists who reached number one in the United States
- List of artists who reached number one on the U.S. Dance Club Songs chart
- List of Billboard number-one dance club songs
- Lists of UK Albums Chart number ones
- Lists of UK Singles Chart number ones
- List of Billboard number-one singles
