= Ain't Too Proud to Beg =

1966 single by the Temptations

Single by the Temptations

from the album Gettin' Ready
- B-side: "You'll Lose a Precious Love"
- Released: May 3, 1966
- Recorded: January 4 and January 11, 1966
- Studio: Hitsville USA (Studio A), Detroit, Michigan
- Genre: Soul; R&B
- Length: 2:36
- Label: Gordy
- Songwriters: Norman Whitfield; Eddie Holland
- Producer: Norman Whitfield

The Temptations singles chronology
"Get Ready" (1966)	"Ain't Too Proud to Beg" (1966)	"Beauty Is Only Skin Deep" (1966)

Official audio
- "Ain't Too Proud to Beg" on YouTube

"Ain't Too Proud to Beg" is a 1966 song and hit single by the Temptations for Motown Records' Gordy label, written by Norman Whitfield and Edward Holland Jr. and produced by Whitfield. It peaked at number 13 on the Billboard Pop Chart, and was a number-one hit on the Billboard R&B charts for eight non-consecutive weeks. The song's success, in the wake of the relative underperformance of the previous Temptations' single, "Get Ready", resulted in Norman Whitfield replacing Smokey Robinson, producer of "Get Ready", as the Temptations' main producer. In 2004, the song finished number 94 in AFI's 100 Years...100 Songs poll thanks to its inclusion in The Big Chill soundtrack.

Notable covers have been recorded by the Rolling Stones in 1974 and by Rick Astley in 1989.

== Reception ==
Cash Box described the song as a "plaintive, slow-shufflin’ blues-soaked ode about a love-sick fella who'll go to any lengths to keep his gal at his side."

== Production ==
On Friday mornings at Motown's Hitsville USA offices, the creative team held Quality Control meetings, at which potential single releases were voted for or against release. To Whitfield's disappointment, "Ain't Too Proud to Beg" failed twice to make it through Motown's Friday morning Quality Control meetings, with Berry Gordy commenting that the song was good, but "needed more story". For the third recorded version of "Ain't Too Proud", Whitfield had David Ruffin's lead vocal arranged just above his actual vocal range. As a result, the singer was forced to strain through numerous takes in order to get out all of the song's high notes. By the end of the "Ain't Too Proud" recording session, recalls Temptation Otis Williams, Ruffin was "drowning in sweat and his glasses were all over his face".

By this point, both the Temptations and Whitfield were confident they had a major hit on their hands. However, both "Ain't Too Proud" and "Get Ready", a Temptations track produced by Smokey Robinson with Eddie Kendricks on lead, turned up at the same Quality Control meeting. Since Robinson was the Temptations' main producer, his song was released and Whitfield's was shelved. Cornelius Grant, the Temptations' road guitarist, band director, and songwriter, recalled that after that decision was made, "it was as if the veins jumped out of Norman's neck." Whitfield was less than pleased at the Quality Control department's decision, and stated plainly that "never again am I gonna lose out on a release like that".. As a compromise, Gordy promised Whitfield that "Ain't Too Proud" would be the next single if "Get Ready" failed to reach the Top 20 on the Billboard Pop Chart.

== Certifications ==
Region	Certification	Certified units/sales
United Kingdom (BPI)	Silver	200,000^{‡}
United States (RIAA)	Gold	500,000^{^}
^{^} Shipments figures based on certification alone.^{‡} Sales+streaming figures based on certification alone.

== The Rolling Stones version ==
"Ain't Too Proud to Beg"

Single by The Rolling Stones

from the album It's Only Rock 'n Roll
- B-side: "Dance Little Sister"
- Recorded: 20 February–May 1974
- Genre: Rock
- Length: 3:30
- Label: Rolling Stones
- Songwriters: Norman Whitfield; Eddie Holland
- Producer: The Glimmer Twins

The Rolling Stones singles chronology
"It's Only Rock 'n Roll (But I Like It)" (1974)	"Ain't Too Proud to Beg" (1974)	"Dance Little Sister" (1974)

Official promo video
- "Ain't Too Proud to Beg" on YouTube

The Rolling Stones recorded the song for their album It's Only Rock 'n Roll (1974), their last album to feature guitarist Mick Taylor. It was released as the second single in the United States only, with the catalogue number RS-19302 and "Dance Little Sister" as the B-side; and also became a top 20 hit, reaching number 17 in the Billboard Hot 100 singles chart. The official promotional video features the band, in bright clothing, performing the song on a stage. In 2007 the band performed the song at Isle of Wight Festival with Amy Winehouse.

Record World said that the Stones' "first oldie hit stab in a decade is more than proud to boogie!"

== Rick Astley version ==
"Ain't Too Proud to Beg"

Single by Rick Astley

from the album Hold Me in Your Arms
- Released: August 7, 1989
- Length: 4:19
- Label: RCA
- Songwriters: Norman Whitfield; Eddie Holland
- Producer: Stock Aitken Waterman

Rick Astley singles chronology
"Giving Up on Love" (1989)	"Ain't Too Proud to Beg" (1989)	"Cry for Help" (1991)

Official audio
- "Ain't Too Proud to Beg" on YouTube

English singer-songwriter Rick Astley covered the song for his 1988 album Hold Me in Your Arms. Originally recorded in 1986, the track was re-recorded for his new album due to a fire at the PWL studios destroying the original master. The song was released as a single in the US and Japan in the summer of 1989. This was Astley's last single with producers Stock Aitken Waterman. On New Year's Eve 2019, Astley performed the song with YolanDa Brown on the BBC's Jools' Annual Hootenanny.

Weekly chart performance for "Ain't Too Proud to Beg"
Chart (1989)	Peak position
US Billboard Hot 100	89
US Adult Contemporary (Billboard)	16

== Notes ==
=== Footnotes ===
1. Williams, Otis and Romanowski, Patricia, Temptations.
2. Weinger, Harry, "Sunshine on a Cloudy Day".

=== Bibliography ===
- Aeppli, Felix (1985). Heart of Stone: The Definitive Rolling Stones Discography, 1962–1983. Ann Arbor, Michigan: Pierian Press. ISBN 0-87650-192-7.
- Posner, Gerald (2002). Motown : Music, Money, Sex, and Power. New York: Random House. ISBN 0-375-50062-6.
- Weinger, Harry (1994). "Sunshine on a Cloudy Day". The Temptations: Emperors of Soul [CD Box Set]. New York: Motown Record Co., L.P.
- Williams, Otis and Romanowski, Patricia (1988, updated 2002). Temptations. Lanham, MD: Cooper Square. ISBN 0-8154-1218-5.
