= Take Me to Your Heart (Rick Astley song) =

Single by Rick Astley

from the album Hold Me in Your Arms
- B-side: "I'll Be Fine"
- Released: 21 November 1988
- Genre: Dance-pop
- Length: 3:27
- Label: RCA
- Songwriter: Stock Aitken Waterman
- Producer: Stock Aitken Waterman

Rick Astley singles chronology
"She Wants to Dance with Me" (1988)	"Take Me to Your Heart" (1988)	"Hold Me in Your Arms" (1989)

Music video
- "Take Me to Your Heart" on YouTube

"Take Me to Your Heart" is a 1988 song recorded by English singer-songwriter Rick Astley. Written and produced by Stock Aitken Waterman, the song was released the same year as the second single from the album, Hold Me in Your Arms. Not released in North America, it was a success on the UK Singles Chart where it peaked at number 8 and was also a Top 10 and a Top 20 in many European other countries. Celebrating the announcement of the Hold Me in Your Arms remastered edition studio album, the music video has been upgraded to 4K as of 14 April 2023. The single was also reissued as a digital EP on the same day.

== Plot track controversy ==
A small amount of controversy was raised around the synthesiser programming similarities of "Big Fun", the hit single recorded by American band Inner City, and Astley's "Take Me to Your Heart". Writer and producer Matt Aitken has confirmed the Astley track was inspired by the Inner City song, but added that "you can't copyright a synth pattern," and claimed, "we wrote a better song [than Inner City] did".

== Critical reception ==
Professional ratings
Review scores
Source	Rating
Number One	/

"Take Me to Your Heart" received positive reviews from critics. A review in Pan-European magazine Music & Media presented the song as "an unmistakeable SAW production with a strong melody and an admirably sparse arrangement". When reviewing the parent album, both Music & Media and Number One cited "Take Me to Your Heart" as one of the best tracks from Hold Me in Your Arms. Similarly, a review in Music Week presented the song as the best track from the album and even "the best SAW song yet". Retrospectively, in 2025, Thomas Edward of Smooth Radio ranked the song number seven in his list of "Rick Astley's 10 greatest songs, ever", adding it was "quintessentially 80s, from the plinking synths to the flirty sax to the impressively shouldered blazers".

== Chart performance ==
"Take Me to Your Heart" achieved some success, but lesser than the lead single from Hold My in Your Arms, "She Wants to Dance with Me". Unlike Astley's previous singles, it was not released in North America. In the UK, it started at number 18 on 26 November 1988 and reached a peak of number eight for two weeks, and spent 11 weeks on the chart. In Ireland, it reached number five and charted for five weeks. In Germany, after a debut at number 54, it jumped to number 13, hit number ten in its sixth week and remained on the chart for a total of 15 weeks. It was also a top ten hit in other five European nations, peaking at number two in both Greece and Spain, number four in Denmark, number seven in Italy and number ten in Sweden. It missed the top ten by one place in Finland, the Netherlands and the Flanders part of Belgium, and culminated at number 16 in Switzerland and number 18 in France.

On the Pan-Eurochart Hot 100 singles chart established by the Music & Media magazine, it debuted at number 55 on 3 December 1988, peaked at number 11 in its fourth week, and charted first for 13 weeks, then recharted for additional eight weeks thanks to France where it was released in March 1989. Much aired on radio, particularly in Spain where it reached number one on the national airplay chart, it appeared for 14 weeks on the European Airplay Top 50 with a peak at number 12. In the Oceanian markets, it was a minor hit, barely stalling outside the top 40 in both Australia (41) and New Zealand (43), while "She Wants to Dance with Me" had reached the top 20 in both countries.

== Track listings ==
- 7" single
1. "Take Me to Your Heart" – 3:27
2. "I'll Be Fine" – 3:44
- 12" maxi
1. "Take Me to Your Heart" (Autumn Leaves mix) – 6:38
2. "I'll Be Fine" – 3:44
3. "Take Me to Your Heart" (instrumental) – 3:27
- CD maxi – Germany
1. "Take Me to Your Heart" (The Dick Dastardly mix) – 6:55
2. "I'll Be Fine" – 3:44
3. "Rick's Hit Mix" – 5:48
- Digital EP
1. "Take Me to Your Heart" (2023 remaster) – 3:30
2. "Take Me to Your Heart" (Autumn Leaves mix) – 6:40
3. "Take Me to Your Heart" (The Dick Dastardly mix) – 6:59
4. "Take Me to Your Heart" (instrumental) – 3:30

== Personnel ==
- Rick Astley – lead and backing vocals
- Matt Aitken – keyboards, guitars
- Mike Stock – keyboards, backing vocals
- George De Angelis – additional keyboards
- A. Linn – drums
- Shirley Lewis – backing vocals
- Mae McKenna – backing vocals
- Leroy Osborne – backing vocals

== Charts ==
=== Weekly charts ===
Weekly chart performance for "Take Me to Your Heart"
Chart (1988–1989)	Peak position
Australia (ARIA)	41
Belgium (Ultratop 50 Flanders)	11
Denmark (IFPI)	4
Europe (European Hot 100)	11
Europe (European Airplay Top 50)	12
Finland (Suomen virallinen lista)	11
France (SNEP)	18
Greece (IFPI)	2
Ireland (IRMA)	5
Italy (Musica e dischi)	7
Luxembourg (Radio Luxembourg)	6
Netherlands (Dutch Top 40)	13
Netherlands (Single Top 100)	11
New Zealand (Recorded Music NZ)	43
Spain (AFYVE)	2
Sweden (Sverigetopplistan)	10
Switzerland (Schweizer Hitparade)	16
UK Singles (Official Charts)	8
UK Dance (Music Week)	5
West Germany (GfK)	10

=== Year-end charts ===
1989 year-end chart performance for "Take Me to Your Heart"
Chart (1989)	Position
UK Singles (OCC)	86
West Germany (Media Control)	68
