= Hold Me in Your Arms (Rick Astley song) =

Single by Rick Astley

from the album Hold Me in Your Arms
- B-side: "I Don't Want to Be Your Lover"
- Released: 30 January 1989
- Genre: Pop
- Length: 4:32
- Label: RCA
- Songwriter: Rick Astley
- Producers: Phil Harding; Ian Curnow

Rick Astley singles chronology
"Take Me to Your Heart" (1988)	"Hold Me in Your Arms" (1989)	"Giving Up on Love" (1989)

Music video
- "Hold Me in Your Arms" on YouTube

"Hold Me in Your Arms" is a song written and performed by English singer-songwriter Rick Astley. Released in early 1989 as the third single from his album Hold Me in Your Arms, it became a top ten hit in the United Kingdom and Ireland. In 2019, Astley recorded and released a "reimagined" version of the song for his album The Best of Me, which features a new piano arrangement.

== Critical reception ==
In an ironic review of 4 February 1989 the Phil Cheeseman, reviewer of British music newspaper Record Mirror, chided the song for lack of class and recommended the singer take a break. Mick Mercer of Melody Maker expressed similar opinion on the single. Julianne Regan of All About Eve also was not really impressed by "Hold Me in Your Arms" by saying "this song is exactly what you'd expect from him" in her capsule review for New Musical Express. Much more positive, a review in Music Week praised Astley's involvement in the writing of "Hold Me in Your Arms", which is presented to be "as strong a ballad as anything [SAW] has ever concocted". Retrospectively, in 2019, James Masterton described it a "slow jam" and a "sweet soul ballad, very much reminiscent of the work of Gregory Abbott", which "found a more than enthusiatic audience", and added that it shows Astley "in his best crooning mode". Retrospectively, in 2025, Thomas Edward of Smooth Radio ranked what he called a "pensive, regretful pop ballad" number ten in his list of "Rick Astley's 10 greatest songs, ever".

== Chart performance ==
Like "Take Me to Your Heart", "Hold Me in Your Arms" was not intended to be marketed in North America. In the United Kingdom, the single entrered the chart at number 26 on 11 February 1989, then climbed to number 11, peaked at number ten the following week and eventually totaled eight weeks on the chart. In Ireland, it charted for four weeks in February 1989, with a peak at number seven. In both countries, it was Astley's consecutive seventh top ten hit. It was also a top-ten hit in Luxembourg and Finland where it attained number three and seven, respectively, but met with a limited success in the other European countries where it was released: it was a top 30 hit in the Flanders part of Belgium, peaking at number 25, and a top 40 hit in Germany – its peak at number 32 marked the first time for an Astley's single to miss the top ten on the German chart – and the Netherlands, where it culminated at number 35. On the Pan-Eurochart Hot 100 singles chart established by the Music & Media magazine, it started at number 78 on 18 February 1989, peaked at number 30 in its third week, and charted for nine weeks. It also appeared for five weeks on the European Airplay Top 50, with a peak at number 24. Outside Europe, "Hold Me in Your Arms" failed to be a hit in Australia, stalling at number 77.

== Track listing ==
- 7" single
1. "Hold Me in Your Arms" – 4:32
2. "I Don't Want to Be Your Lover" – 3:58

== Charts ==
Weekly chart performance for "Hold Me in Your Arms"
Chart (1989)	Peak position
Australia (ARIA)	77
Belgium (Ultratop 50 Flanders)	25
Europe (European Hot 100)	30
Europe (European Airplay Top 50)	24
Finland (Suomen virallinen lista)	7
Germany (Media Control Charts)	32
Ireland (IRMA)	7
Luxembourg (Radio Luxembourg)	3
Netherlands (Dutch Top 40)	27
Netherlands (Single Top 100)	35
Quebec (ADISQ)	17
UK Singles (OCC)	10
