= It Would Take a Strong Strong Man =

Single by Rick Astley

from the album Whenever You Need Somebody
- B-side: "You Move Me"
- Released: July 1988
- Genre: Pop
- Length: 3:39
- Label: RCA
- Songwriters: Mike Stock; Matt Aitken; Pete Waterman
- Producer: Stock Aitken Waterman

Rick Astley singles chronology
"Together Forever" (1988)	"It Would Take a Strong Strong Man" (1988)	"She Wants to Dance with Me" (1988)

Music video
- "It Would Take a Strong Strong Man" on YouTube

"It Would Take a Strong Strong Man" is a 1987 song by English singer-songwriter Rick Astley. Written by Stock Aitken Waterman, it was released as the fifth single from Astley's debut album Whenever You Need Somebody. It was mainly intended for the American market where it was a top ten hit, and was not released in the United Kingdom and most of Europe.

== Background and release ==
The B-side "You Move Me" written by Rick Astley was featured in the movie Cocktail. Producer Pete Waterman excitedly dragged Astley into his office and played Astley a VHS of the trailer of the movie and Astley was stunned that his song was played all the way through it. Waterman neglected to tell Astley that it was only in the trailer and not the movie.

== Critical reception ==
Retrospectively, in 2025, Thomas Edward of Smooth Radio ranked the song number nine in his list of "Rick Astley's 10 greatest songs, ever".

== Chart performance ==
"It Would Take a Strong Strong Man" reached number one in Canada, number ten on the US Billboard Hot 100 and number one for one week on the Hot Adult Contemporary chart.

== Track listing ==
- 7" and cassette single
1. "It Would Take a Strong Strong Man" – 3:39
2. "You Move Me" – 3:40
- 12" single
1. "It Would Take a Strong Strong Man" (Matt's Jazzy Guitar mix) – 7:46
2. "It Would Take a Strong Strong Man" (instrumental) – 3:39
3. "It Would Take a Strong Strong Man" – 3:39
4. "You Move Me" – 3:40

== Charts ==
=== Weekly charts ===
Weekly chart performance for "It Would Take a Strong Strong Man"
Chart (1988–1989)	Peak position
Canada Top Singles (RPM)	1
Quebec (ADISQ)	1
US Billboard Hot 100	10
US Adult Contemporary (Billboard)	1
US Dance Club Songs (Billboard)	8

=== Year-end charts ===
Year-end chart performance for "It Would Take a Strong Strong Man"
Chart (1988)	Position
Canada Top Singles (RPM)	43
Tokyo (Tokio Hot 100)	96

== Personnel ==
- Rick Astley – lead vocals
- Matt Aitken – guitars, keyboards
- Mike Stock – keyboards
- "A. Linn" – LinnDrum programming
- Ian Curnow – Fairlight programming
- Dee Lewis, Shirley Lewis, Mae McKenna, Suzanne Rhatigan – backing vocals
