= Cry for Help =

1991 single by Rick Astley

Single by Rick Astley

from the album Free
- B-side: "Behind the Smile"
- Released: 14 January 1991
- Length: 4:51 (album version); 4:17 (radio edit)
- Label: RCA
- Songwriters: Rick Astley; Rob Fisher
- Producers: Gary Stevenson; Rick Astley

Rick Astley singles chronology
| "Ain't Too Proud to Beg" (1989) | "Cry for Help" (1991) | "Move Right Out" (1991) |

Music video
- "Cry for Help" on YouTube

"Cry for Help" is a song by English singer-songwriter Rick Astley, released as the first single from his third studio album, Free (1991). It was written by Astley and Rob Fisher, formerly one half of the 1980s pop outfits Naked Eyes and Climie Fisher. The Andraé Crouch Choir provided backing vocals. The song is a ballad, unlike Astley's earlier dance-oriented hit singles.

Released as a single on 14 January 1991 by RCA Records, "Cry for Help" reached number seven on both the UK Singles Chart and the US Billboard Hot 100, becoming Astley's last top-10 hit in either country. It also reached number four in Canada and was a number-one hit on both the US and Canadian Adult Contemporary charts. Its accompanying music video received heavy rotation on MTV Europe in February 1991. "Cry for Help" was awarded one of BMI's Pop Awards in 1993, honoring the songwriters, composers and music publishers of the song.

The song has been sung by Rick Astley in duet with Søren Sko and covered by Thomas Anders (ex-Modern Talking). In 2019, Astley recorded and released a "reimagined" version of the song for his album The Best of Me. On 27 April 2021, the original music video was upgraded to 1080p HD to celebrate the 30th anniversary of the song reaching number seven on the Billboard Hot 100. On 18 July 2024, the original music video was upgraded again to 4K to celebrate the reissue of Free.

== Critical reception ==
Dave Obee from Calgary Herald felt the "finest moments" on the song come from Andrae Crouch's choir arrangement, adding that it's what makes "Cry for Help" "worth hearing". David Quantick from NME wrote, "Rick still sings like God, and 'Cry for Help' is pretty good in a Wet Wet Wet sort of way, especially when the Proper Choir comes in". Eleanor Levy from Record Mirror described it as "a Michael McDonald style ballad that, rather than shocking the world, cuddles it instead." Retrospectively, in 2025, Thomas Edward of Smooth Radio ranked the song number three in his list of "Rick Astley's 10 greatest songs, ever".

== Track listing ==
- 12-inch single
1. "Cry for Help" – 6:26
2. "Behind the Smile" – 4:33
3. "Cry for Help" (album version) – 4:50
- CD single
1. "Cry for Help" (7-inch version) – 4:20
2. "Behind the Smile" – 4:37
3. "Cry for Help" (12-inch version) – 6:27
- 7-inch and cassette single
1. "Cry for Help" (edit) – 4:03
2. "Behind the Smile" – 4:33

== Personnel ==
- Rick Astley – lead vocals
- Dave West – acoustic piano, Fender Rhodes, organ, synthesizers
- Hywel Maggs – guitars
- Vinnie Colaiuta – drums
- Anne Dudley – string arrangements and conductor
- The Andraé Crouch Choir – backing vocals

== Charts ==
=== Weekly charts ===
Weekly chart performance for "Cry for Help"
| Chart (1991) | Peak position |
|---|---|
| Australia (ARIA) | 13 |
| Austria (Ö3 Austria Top 40) | 22 |
| Belgium (Ultratop 50 Flanders) | 5 |
| Canada Top Singles (RPM) | 4 |
| Canada Adult Contemporary (RPM) | 1 |
| Europe (Eurochart Hot 100) | 16 |
| Europe (European Hit Radio) | 1 |
| Finland (Suomen virallinen lista) | 11 |
| Germany (GfK) | 14 |
| Greece (IFPI) | 3 |
| Ireland (IRMA) | 9 |
| Italy (Musica e dischi) | 10 |
| Luxembourg (Radio Luxembourg) | 5 |
| Netherlands (Dutch Top 40) | 11 |
| Netherlands (Single Top 100) | 11 |
| Portugal (AFP) | 9 |
| Quebec (ADISQ) | 1 |
| Spain (AFYVE) | 11 |
| Sweden (Sverigetopplistan) | 17 |
| UK Singles (Official Charts) | 7 |
| UK Airplay (Music Week) | 1 |
| US Billboard Hot 100 | 7 |
| US Adult Contemporary (Billboard) | 1 |
| US Cash Box Top 100 | 7 |

=== Year-end charts ===
Year-end chart performance for "Cry for Help"
| Chart (1991) | Position |
|---|---|
| Australia (ARIA) | 85 |
| Belgium (Ultratop) | 53 |
| Canada Top Singles (RPM) | 39 |
| Canada Adult Contemporary (RPM) | 14 |
| Europe (Eurochart Hot 100) | 94 |
| Europe (European Hit Radio) | 22 |
| Germany (Media Control) | 59 |
| Italy (Musica e dischi) | 54 |
| Netherlands (Dutch Top 40) | 76 |
| Netherlands (Single Top 100) | 77 |
| Sweden (Topplistan) | 93 |
| UK Singles (OCC) | 95 |
| US Billboard Hot 100 | 70 |
| US Adult Contemporary (Billboard) | 4 |

== Release history ==
Release dates and formats for "Cry for Help"
| Region | Date | Format(s) | Label(s) | Ref. |
|---|---|---|---|---|
| United Kingdom | 14 January 1991 | 7-inch vinyl; 12-inch vinyl; CD; cassette | RCA | |
| Australia | 21 January 1991 | 7-inch vinyl; cassette | RCA | |
| Japan | 30 January 1991 | Mini-CD | RCA | |
