= Phil Harding (producer) =

English music producer, audio engineer, remixer, academic and author

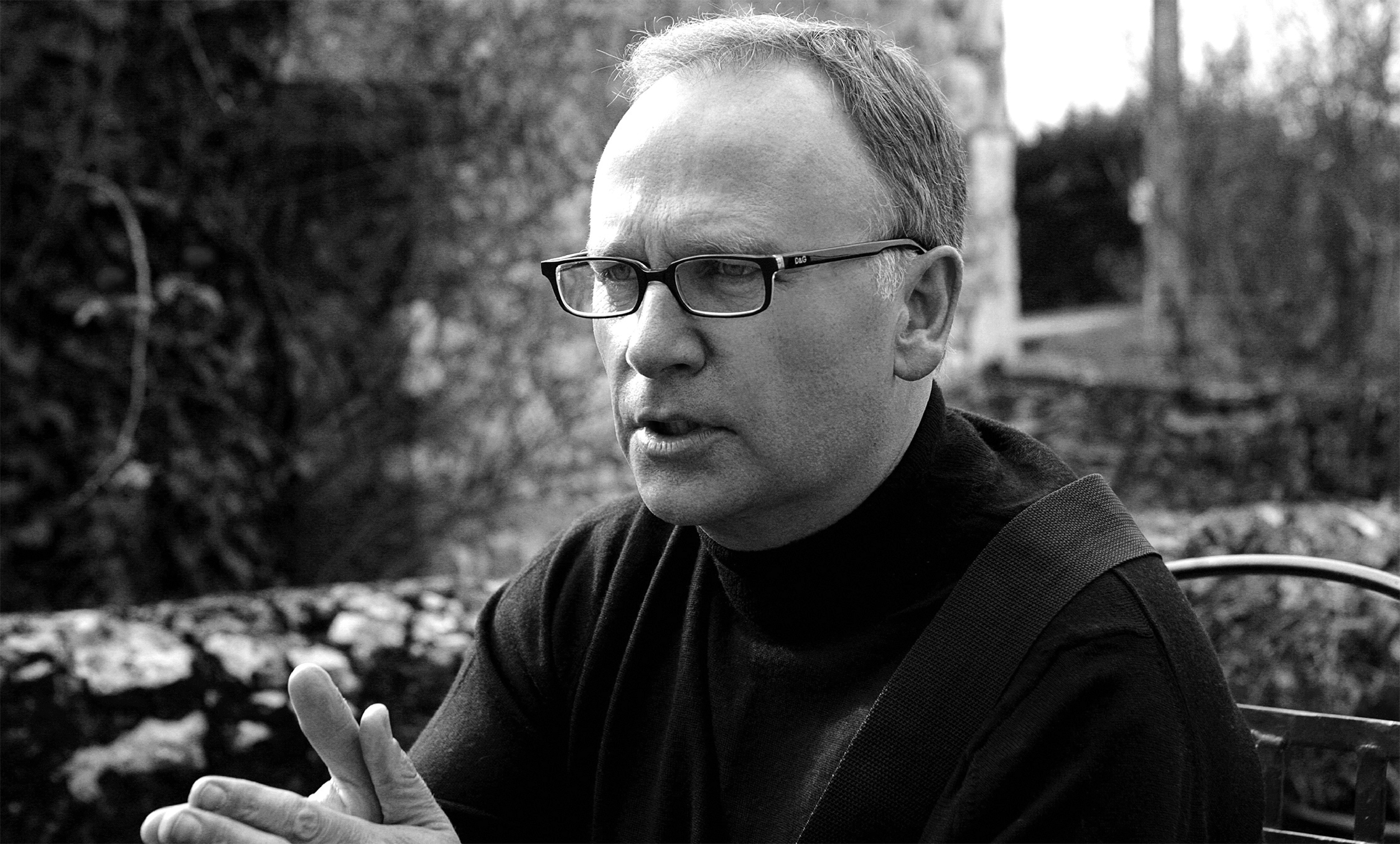
- Harding in 2015

Background information
- Born: Philip James Harding; 30 April 1957 (age 69)
- Origin: England
- Occupations: Record producer; audio engineer; remixer; academic; author

Philip James Harding (born on 30 April 1957) is an English record producer, audio engineer, remixer, academic and author.

Harding started in the music industry aged 16 at London's Marquee Studios in 1973, where he got to work as an assistant engineer under the guidance of top producers on albums for artists such as Elton John, Kiki Dee and Barry Blue. As Harding's career progressed, a long list of credits began to accumulate, with artists as diverse as The Clash, Killing Joke, Toyah Willcox, Amii Stewart and Matt Bianco, all taking advantage of Harding's fast-growing reputation as a top engineer. The very first band Harding worked with was Killing Joke where he was a young in-house engineer.

By 1984, a newly formed production team at The Marquee – Stock Aitken Waterman – was added to the list. Harding engineered and mixed their first chart successes, Divine and Hazell Dean, and their breakthrough international hit and first No. 1 single, Dead Or Alive's "You Spin Me Round (Like a Record)". Moving across to the PWL Studios in London, 'The Hit Factory', their success was unstoppable – for artists such as Rick Astley, Mel & Kim, Bananarama, Pet Shop Boys and Kylie Minogue. Harding's partnership (from 1986) with Ian Curnow in the basement studio of PWL saw them become internationally renowned remixers/producers, with multiple UK and American singles and club chart successes for a list of artists, including Basia, Diana Ross, Depeche Mode, The Jackson 5, Erasure, The Four Tops, Five Star, Chic, Jesus Jones, John Travolta & Olivia Newton-John, ABC, Imagination, Climie Fisher, Donna Summer, Voice of the Beehive and Debbie Harry.

In 1992, Harding left PWL to set up his own production company, P&E Music, with Ian Curnow at The Strongroom studio complex in London. A further list of hits followed as producers and industry 'go-to' remixers. Even when occasionally working under a number of new aliases such as CHAPS and Power Syndicate, success came for artists such as East 17 (including 1994 Christmas No. 1, "Stay Another Day"), Deuce, 911, Caught in the Act, Let Loose and Boyzone (including the 1996 No.1 single, "Words").

Since the 2000s, Harding became closely involved in music education and was appointed co-chair of JAMES (Joint Audio Media Education Support), involved in masterclasses, accreditations and course planning; as well as being a director of the MPG (Music Producers Guild).

In 2010 Harding published the book PWL From The Factory Floor, with an accompanying Phil Harding Club Mixes of the 80s' CD, and in 2011 worked with Lamont Dozier in Los Angeles mixing Cliff Richard's Soulicious album. In 2017, he completed a PhD doctorate in Music Production at Leeds Beckett University.

Harding's music production team with Julian Wiggins and Simon Dalton, PJS Music Productions, have completed projects for Holly Johnson, Belinda Carlisle, Samantha Fox, Curiosity Killed The Cat and Mel & Kim.

In 2019, Harding's book Pop Music Production was published (in the Routledge Press academic series, 'Perspectives on Music Production'), which examines the pop music culture, business, songwriting and production processes around his work in the 1990s.

2020 saw Harding embark on a tour of University lectures around the UK, star in an 'In Conversation With...' event and feature in further radio, TV and press interviews.

Harding's first academic journal paper was published in the "Journal of Music, Technology & Education" (Volume 13, Numbers 2-3, 1 December 2021), entitled "Pop vs Rock: A comparison study of managing sessions in the recording studio and the influences of genre", co-authored with Nyssim Lefford.

== Artists Harding has worked with ==
- 911
- ABC
- Amii Stewart
- Bananarama
- Band Aid II
- Basia
- Belinda Carlisle
- Blue Mercedes
- Brother Beyond
- Boyzone
- Chic
- Cliff Richard
- Diana Ross
- Climie Fisher
- Curiosity Killed The Cat
- Dead Or Alive
- Debbie Gibson
- Debbie Harry
- Depeche Mode
- Deuce
- Divine
- Dollar
- Donna Summer
- Dusty Springfield
- East 17
- Eighth Wonder
- Erasure
- Five Star
- Gary Moore
- Gina G
- Godley & Creme
- Hazell Dean
- Holly Johnson
- Imagination
- Jason Donovan
- Jermaine Stewart
- Jesus Jones
- Jimmy Ruffin
- Jimmy Somerville
- John Travolta & Olivia Newton-John
- Kavana
- Killing Joke
- Kim Appleby
- Kissing the Pink
- Kylie Minogue
- Let Loose
- Lisa Barbuscia
- Liberty X
- Lonnie Gordon
- Matt Bianco
- Mel & Kim
- Nik Kershaw
- Nitzer Ebb
- OTT
- Pepsi & Shirlie
- Pet Shop Boys
- Peter Andre
- Princess
- Rick Astley
- Roger Daltrey
- Roxette
- Samantha Fox
- Sinitta
- Sonia
- Sybil
- Take That
- The Belle Stars
- The Blow Monkeys
- The Clash
- The Cool Notes
- The Four Tops
- The Jackson Five
- The Three Degrees
- Thelma Houston
- Toyah Willcox
- T'Pau
- Tracey Ullman
- 2wo Third3
- Ultra
- Voice of the Beehive
- Worlds Apart

== Bibliography ==
- Hämäläinen, Jyrki "Spider" (November 2020). Killing Joke: Are You Receiving?. New Haven Publishing Ltd. ISBN 978-1912587407.
