= Matt Aitken =

- Born: Matthew James Aitken; 25 August 1956 (age 69); Coventry, England
- Genres: Pop; disco; dance-pop; hi-NRG
- Occupations: Songwriter; record producer; musician
- Instrument: Guitar
- Labels: RCA
- Member of: Stock Aitken Waterman

Matthew James Aitken (born 25 August 1956) is an English songwriter and record producer, brought up in Astley, Greater Manchester, best known as part of the 1980s/early-1990s songwriting/production trio Stock Aitken Waterman.

== Biography ==
He began his musical career as a musician and was a member of many bands before joining Mike Stock to write and produce music for other artists. They both later teamed up with Pete Waterman, and went from small independent record labels to the major RCA Records, producing myriad hits. According to Waterman, Aitken was a noted perfectionist, particularly when it came to his guitar solos.

After the partnership split up in 1991, Aitken went into a period of retirement, raising his daughters, and pursuing hobbies such as auto racing. He later returned to the music industry in 1994—partnering with Mike Stock once again and having success with acts such as Nicki French, Scooch, and Robson & Jerome—before seemingly retiring again in 2002.
