= 2016 in British music =

This is a summary of the year 2016 in British music.

== Events ==
- 10 January – Rock icon David Bowie passes away of liver cancer, two days after the release of his final album; Bowie's illness had not been disclosed to the public until his death. Having stipulated that he did not want a funeral ceremony, Bowie is cremated two days later in New Jersey, USA, with arrangements for his ashes to be scattered in accordance with Buddhist rituals on the island of Bali.
- 13 January – Chetham's School of Music announces the appointment of Alun Jones as its new Head, effective September 2016.
- 28 January – Wigmore Hall live-streams performances for the first time.
- 4 February – The City of Birmingham Symphony Orchestra announces the appointment of Mirga Gražinytė-Tyla as its next music director, effective September 2016, with an initial contract of 3 years. She is the first female conductor to be named music director of the CBSO.
- 19 February – The Royal Philharmonic Society announces Sir Peter Maxwell Davies as the recipient of its 102nd Gold Medal.
- 24 February – The 2016 Brit Awards ceremony takes place at The O2, presented by Ant & Dec. David Bowie is awarded the "Brits Icon" award, a few weeks after his death. Actor Gary Oldman accepts the award on Bowie's behalf.
- 2 March – The Bridgewater Hall announces the appointment of Andrew Bolt as its new chief executive.
- 21 March – The Gloucester Cathedral Choir announces that it is to recruit girl choristers for the first time in its history, in April 2016.
- 22 March – Mark Wigglesworth announces his resignation as music director of English National Opera, effective at the end of the 2015–2016 season.
- 18 April – The Royal Northern College of Music announces the appointment of Sir John Tomlinson as its next president, for a term of 5 years, effective January 2017.
- 23 April – The London Woodwind Orchestra, the first professional woodwind orchestra in the UK, gives its debut performance at St John's Smith Square.
- 29 April – English National Opera announces the appointment of Daniel Kramer as its next artistic director, effective 1 August 2016.
- 12 May – The Stone Roses release their first new single in 21 years, "All For One", their first new material since their 2011 reformation.
- 14 May – The United Kingdom will compete in the final of this year's Eurovision Song Contest in Stockholm, Sweden. This year's Joe and Jake will represent the United Kingdom with their song, You're Not Alone
- 15 May – Sheku Kanneh-Mason wins the 2016 BBC Young Musician of the Year award.
- 10–12 June – Download Festival 2016 takes place at Donington Park in Leicestershire. The Lemmy stage (named in honour of late Motörhead frontman Lemmy Kilmister) was headlined by Rammstein, Black Sabbath and Iron Maiden, the Zippo encore stage by All Time Low, NOFX and Jane's Addiction, the Maverick stage by the Gutterdämmerung project by Bjorn Tagemose, Pennywise and Saxon, and the Dogtooth stage by Raging Speedhorn, Municipal Waste and Napalm Death.
- 12 June – Queen's Birthday Honours
  - Rod Stewart is made a Knight Bachelor.
  - Alison Balsom is awarded an Order of the British Empire (OBE).
  - Brian Lang, Colin Lawson, Paul Lewis, John McLeod are each made a Commander of the Order of the British Empire.
- 13 June – The Royal Albert Hall announces that Chris Cotton, its current chief executive, is to retire.
- 24 June – Never heard during the composer's lifetime, Still Point by Daphne Oram receives its world premiere at St John's Smith Square, London, 67 years after Oram composed the work.
- 11 July – Release of Stand As One – Live at Glastonbury 2016, an album of live performances from the 2016 Glastonbury Festival in memory of Jo Cox, the MP recently killed in a violent attack; proceeds from the album will go towards helping Oxfam's work with refugees, Cox having worked for the charity for some years.
- 13 July – The Guildhall School of Music and Drama announces the appointment of Lynne Williams as its next principal, effective in 2017.
- 2 August – The BBC Scottish Symphony Orchestra announces the appointment of Dominic Parker as its new Director, in succession to Gavin Reid.
- 12 September – The Royal Opera House, Covent Garden announces the appointment of Oliver Mears as its next Director of Opera, effective March 2017.
- 8 October – The Wind in the Willows, a musical by Julian Fellowes with music and lyrics by George Stiles and Anthony Drewe, receives its world première at the Theatre Royal, Plymouth.
- 16 October – Singer-songwriter Peter Skellern, suffering from an inoperable brain tumour, is ordained as an Anglican priest by the Bishop of Truro.
- 21 October – English National Opera announces the appointment of Martyn Brabbins as its new music director, with immediate effect, with an initial contract through October 2020.
- 24 October – The Royal Albert Hall announces the appointment of Craig Hassall as its next chief executive, effective 2017.
- 4 November – The UK government announced withdrawal of funding support for the proposed new London Concert Hall.
- 7 December – Northern Ireland Opera announces the appointment of Walter Sutcliffe as its next artistic director, effective February 2017.
- 13 December – The Queen's Hall, Edinburgh announces that its chief executive, Adrian Harris, is to retire at the end of December 2016.
- 30 December – New Year's Honours 2017
  - Dame Evelyn Glennie is made a Member of the Order of the Companions of Honour.
  - Ray Davies, Jeffrey Tate and Bryn Terfel are each made a Knight Bachelor.
  - Lennox Mackenzie and Stephen Maddock are each made an Officer of the Order of the British Empire.
  - Iestyn Davies and Anthony Forbes are each made a Member of the Order of the British Empire.

== Television series ==
- 8 January – Launch of the first series of Lip Sync Battle: UK on Channel 5, a British version of the American musical comedy television show where celebrities lip sync battle each other to various popular songs.
- 9 January – Launch of the fifth series of The Voice UK, the last to be broadcast by the BBC.

== Artists and groups reformed ==
- Arab Strap
- Bentley Rhythm Ace
- Meet Me in St. Louis
- Spice Girls – GEM
- Super Furry Animals
- The Vapors
- The Zutons

== Groups on hiatus ==
- Bombay Bicycle Club
- One Direction

== Groups disbanded ==
- Allo Darlin'
- The Bad Shepherds
- Bolt Thrower
- The Business
- Cherry Ghost
- Dead or Alive
- Funeral for a Friend
- FVK
- The Enemy
- Kosheen
- Lush
- Maybeshewill
- Palma Violets
- Viola Beach (all lost their lives in a road accident)
- Vondelpark
- Wodensthrone

== Classical works ==
- Julian Anderson – Incantesimi
- Sally Beamish
  - Chaconne (for organ)
  - A Shakespeare Masque (text by Carol Ann Duffy)
- Luke Bedford
  - Three Caves
  - In Black Bright Ink
- Judith Bingham – The Orchid and Its Hunters
- Harrison Birtwistle – Five Lessons in a Frame
- Mark David Boden – Ghyll
- Charlotte Bray
  - Agnus Dei
  - Stone Dancer
  - Falling in the Fire (for cello and orchestra)
- Diana Burrell – Concerto for Brass and Orchestra
- Paul Carr – Violin Concerto
- Chiu-yu Chou – Tongue
- Desmond Clarke
  - Viola Concerto
  - Xyla
- Anna Clyne – This Lunar Beauty
- Ronald Corp – "Behold, the sea"
- Tom Coult
  - Sonnet Machine
  - Spirit of the Staircase
- Laurence Crane – Cobbled Section After Cobbled Section
- Stephen Deazley (music) and Martin Riley (text) – The Rattler
- James Dillon – The Gates for string quartet and orchestra
- Richard Emsley – Strange Attractor
- Edmund Finnis – Parallel Colour
- Alissa Firsova
  - Paradisi Gloria
  - Bride of the Wind
- Cheryl Frances-Hoad – Game On (for piano and Commodore 64)
- Michael Zev Gordon – In the Middle of Things
- Tom Harrold
  - Nightfires
  - Raze
- Malcolm Hayes – Violin Concerto
- Morgan Hayes – Overture: The Kiss
- Piers Hellawell – Wild Flow
- Thomas Hyde – Piano Trio: after Picasso
- Patrick John Jones – Locks of the approaching storm
- Mica Levi – Signal Before War
- Zoë Martlew – Broad St. Burlesque
- Christian Mason – Isolarion III
- Benedict Mason – Horns Strings and Harmony
- David Matthews – Norfolk March
- Bayan Northcott – Concerto for Orchestra
- Ben Palmer – Flying in the Fire
- Roxanna Panufnik – Kyrie after Byrd
- Owain Park – Upheld by stillness
- Aaron Parker – After sunset fades
- Anthony Payne – Of Land, Sea and Sky
- Joseph Phibbs – Partita
- John Pickard – Symphony No 5
- Michael Pisaro – fields have ears (10)
- Sophya Polevaya – Carousel
- Francis Pott – Laudate Dominum
- John Powell – A Prussian Requiem
- Alwynne Pritchard – Rockaby
- Ryan Probert – Mattei
- Derek Rodgers – Clarinet Concerto
- Matt Rogers – We Happened to Travel
- David Sawer – April\March
- Frederick Scott – Toccata seconda
- Percy Sherwood – Concerto for violin and cello
- Howard Skempton – Piano Concerto
- Mark-Anthony Turnage – Strapless (ballet in one act, choreography by Christopher Wheeldon)
- Roderick Williams – Ave verum corpus re-imagined
- Scott Wilson – head-neck-chest-four-five-six-thing
- John Woolrich – Swan Song

== Opera ==
- Figaro Gets a Divorce by Elena Langer (libretto by David Pountney) is premièred on 21 February 2016 by Welsh National Opera in Cardiff.
- Found and Lost by Emily Hall is premièred at the Corinthia Hotel London in January 2016.
- Other premieres:
  - Thomas Adès and Tom Cairns – The Exterminating Angel
  - Iain Bell (music), David Antrobus and Emma Jenkins (libretto) – In Parenthesis
  - David Bruce and Glyn Maxwell – Nothing
  - Nicholas Jackson – The Rose and the Ring
  - Hannah Kendall and Tessa McWatt – The Knife of Dawn
  - Stuart MacRae and Louise Welsh – The Devil Inside
  - Sir Peter Maxwell Davies – The Hogboon
  - Mark Simpson and Melanie Challenger – Pleasure
  - Philip Venables – 4.48 Psychosis

== Musical theatre ==
- Fantastic Mr Fox by Sam Holcroft, with music by Arthur Darvill.
- Half a Sixpence, co-created by Cameron Mackintosh with book by Julian Fellowes and music and lyrics by George Stiles and Anthony Drewe (also including several songs by David Heneker from the 1963 musical based on the same story.
- The Wind in the Willows by Julian Fellowes, with music and lyrics by George Stiles and Anthony Drewe

== Musical films ==
- Sing Street

== Film scores and incidental music ==
=== Film ===
- Erran Baron Cohen & David Buckley – Grimsby
- Charlie Mole – Dad's Army
- Rachel Portman – Their Finest

=== Television ===
- Debbie Wiseman – Dickensian

== British music awards ==
- Brit Awards – see 2016 Brit Awards

== Charts and sales ==
For the first time in the history of the singles chart, the top three positions were occupied by the same artist. In the chart ending 14 January 2016, Justin Bieber was at number one with "Love Yourself", number two with "Sorry" and number three with "What Do You Mean?".

In the chart ending 4 February, David Bowie matched an album chart record of having 12 albums simultaneously in the top 40, a record set by Elvis Presley following his death in 1977. His album Best of Bowie also became the first ever album to reach number one due to streaming.

In the chart ending 3 November, Elvis Presley broke a record for most number-one albums for a solo artist when his album The Wonder Of You reached number one.

=== Number-one singles ===
The singles chart includes a proportion for streaming.

Key
| † | Best performing single of the year |

| Chart date (week ending) | Song | Artist(s) | Chart sales | References |
|---|---|---|---|---|
| 7 January | "Love Yourself" | Justin Bieber | 122,997 | |
| 14 January | "Love Yourself" | Justin Bieber | 78,658 | |
| 21 January | "Love Yourself" | Justin Bieber | 74,565 | |
| 28 January | "Stitches" | Shawn Mendes | 68,125 | |
| 4 February | "Stitches" | Shawn Mendes | 71,503 | |
| 11 February | "Pillowtalk" | Zayn Malik | 112,497 | |
| 18 February | "7 Years" | Lukas Graham | 104,881 | |
| 25 February | "7 Years" | Lukas Graham | 133,758 | |
| 3 March | "7 Years" | Lukas Graham | 131,488 | |
| 10 March | "7 Years" | Lukas Graham | 106,494 | |
| 17 March | "7 Years" | Lukas Graham | 91,299 | |
| 24 March | "I Took a Pill in Ibiza" | Mike Posner | 77,838 | |
| 31 March | "I Took a Pill in Ibiza" | Mike Posner | 81,548 | |
| 7 April | "I Took a Pill in Ibiza" | Mike Posner | 83,907 | |
| 14 April | "I Took a Pill in Ibiza" | Mike Posner | 75,710 | |
| 21 April | "One Dance" † | Drake featuring Wizkid & Kyla | 72,615 | |
| 28 April | "One Dance" † | Drake featuring Wizkid & Kyla | 115,078 | |
| 5 May | "One Dance" † | Drake featuring Wizkid & Kyla | 128,535 | |
| 12 May | "One Dance" † | Drake featuring Wizkid & Kyla | 140,731 | |
| 19 May | "One Dance" † | Drake featuring Wizkid & Kyla | 123,519 | |
| 26 May | "One Dance" † | Drake featuring Wizkid & Kyla | 104,998 | |
| 2 June | "One Dance" † | Drake featuring Wizkid & Kyla | 92,593 | |
| 9 June | "One Dance" † | Drake featuring Wizkid & Kyla | 84,742 | |
| 16 June | "One Dance" † | Drake featuring Wizkid & Kyla | 72,934 | |
| 23 June | "One Dance" † | Drake featuring Wizkid & Kyla | 60,866 | |
| 30 June | "One Dance" † | Drake featuring Wizkid & Kyla | 60,493 | |
| 7 July | "One Dance" † | Drake featuring Wizkid & Kyla | 59,256 | |
| 14 July | "One Dance" † | Drake featuring Wizkid & Kyla | 58,851 | |
| 21 July | "One Dance" † | Drake featuring Wizkid & Kyla | 54,726 | |
| 28 July | "One Dance" † | Drake featuring Wizkid & Kyla | 59,563 | |
| 4 August | "Cold Water" | Major Lazer featuring Justin Bieber & MØ | 102,489 | |
| 11 August | "Cold Water" | Major Lazer featuring Justin Bieber & MØ | 104,446 | |
| 18 August | "Cold Water" | Major Lazer featuring Justin Bieber & MØ | 93,807 | |
| 25 August | "Cold Water" | Major Lazer featuring Justin Bieber & MØ | 82,925 | |
| 1 September | "Cold Water" | Major Lazer featuring Justin Bieber & MØ | 71,507 | |
| 8 September | "Closer" | The Chainsmokers featuring Halsey | 79,970 | |
| 15 September | "Closer" | The Chainsmokers featuring Halsey | 91,666 | |
| 22 September | "Closer" | The Chainsmokers featuring Halsey | 88,597 | |
| 29 September | "Closer" | The Chainsmokers featuring Halsey | 82,593 | |
| 6 October | "Say You Won't Let Go" | James Arthur | 84,842 | |
| 13 October | "Say You Won't Let Go" | James Arthur | 92,360 | |
| 20 October | "Say You Won't Let Go" | James Arthur | 105,603 | |
| 27 October | "Shout Out to My Ex" | Little Mix | 95,273 | |
| 3 November | "Shout Out to My Ex" | Little Mix | 111,816 | |
| 10 November | "Shout Out to My Ex" | Little Mix | 79,039 | |
| 17 November | "Rockabye" | Clean Bandit featuring Sean Paul & Anne-Marie | 72,071 | |
| 24 November | "Rockabye" | Clean Bandit featuring Sean Paul & Anne-Marie | 76,189 | |
| 1 December | "Rockabye" | Clean Bandit featuring Sean Paul & Anne-Marie | 74,545 | |
| 8 December | "Rockabye" | Clean Bandit featuring Sean Paul & Anne-Marie | 82,445 | |
| 15 December | "Rockabye" | Clean Bandit featuring Sean Paul & Anne-Marie | 70,467 | |
| 22 December | "Rockabye" | Clean Bandit featuring Sean Paul & Anne-Marie | 63,335 | |
| 29 December | "Rockabye" | Clean Bandit featuring Sean Paul & Anne-Marie | 57,631 | |

=== Number-one albums ===
The albums chart includes a proportion for streaming.

Key
| † | Best performing album of the year |

| Chart date (week ending) | Album | Artist | Chart sales | References |
|---|---|---|---|---|
| 7 January | 25 † | Adele | 75,783 | |
| 14 January | 25 † | Adele | 43,446 | |
| 21 January | Blackstar | David Bowie | 146,168 | |
| 28 January | Blackstar | David Bowie | 81,403 | |
| 4 February | Blackstar | David Bowie | 34,456 | |
| 11 February | Best of Bowie | David Bowie | 28,997 | |
| 18 February | A Head Full of Dreams | Coldplay | 30,146 | |
| 25 February | 25 † | Adele | 27,780 | |
| 3 March | 25 † | Adele | 28,168 | |
| 10 March | I Like It When You Sleep, for You Are So Beautiful yet So Unaware of It | The 1975 | 58,378 | |
| 17 March | 25 † | Adele | 53,936 | |
| 24 March | 25 † | Adele | 22,795 | |
| 31 March | 25 † | Adele | 20,915 | |
| 7 April | Mind of Mine | Zayn Malik | 22,250 | |
| 14 April | Everything You've Come to Expect | The Last Shadow Puppets | 30,797 | |
| 21 April | Cleopatra | The Lumineers | 10,892 | |
| 28 April | The Hope Six Demolition Project | PJ Harvey | 11,436 | |
| 5 May | Lemonade | Beyoncé | 73,392 | |
| 12 May | Views | Drake | 78,397 | |
| 19 May | A Moon Shaped Pool | Radiohead | 50,543 | |
| 26 May | Views | Drake | 23,846 | |
| 2 June | Dangerous Woman | Ariana Grande | 19,582 | |
| 9 June | The Ride | Catfish and the Bottlemen | 38,103 | |
| 16 June | Stranger to Stranger | Paul Simon | 19,218 | |
| 23 June | 50 | Rick Astley | 23,691 | |
| 30 June | A Moon Shaped Pool | Radiohead | 44,272 | |
| 7 July | 25 † | Adele | 24,837 | |
| 14 July | California | Blink-182 | 23,529 | |
| 21 July | Ellipsis | Biffy Clyro | 37,308 | |
| 28 July | Love & Hate | Michael Kiwanuka | 11,639 | |
| 4 August | All Over the World: The Very Best of Electric Light Orchestra | Electric Light Orchestra | 15,302 | |
| 11 August | Viola Beach | Viola Beach | 17,379 | |
| 18 August | Blossoms | Blossoms | 20,987 | |
| 25 August | Blossoms | Blossoms | 7,948 | |
| 1 September | Blond | Frank Ocean | 31,866 | |
| 8 September | Encore: Movie Partners Sing Broadway | Barbra Streisand | 19,778 | |
| 15 September | Cartwheels | Ward Thomas | 12,127 | |
| 22 September | Wild World | Bastille | 36,039 | |
| 29 September | Wild World | Bastille | 12,025 | |
| 6 October | Young as the Morning, Old as the Sea | Passenger | 18,885 | |
| 13 October | Following My Intuition | Craig David | 24,500 | |
| 20 October | Revolution Radio | Green Day | 30,880 | |
| 27 October | Walls | Kings of Leon | 49,964 | |
| 3 November | The Wonder of You | Elvis Presley | 63,500 | |
| 10 November | Back from the Edge | James Arthur | 40,906 | |
| 17 November | The Heavy Entertainment Show | Robbie Williams | 66,825 | |
| 24 November | 24 Hrs | Olly Murs | 57,981 | |
| 1 December | Glory Days | Little Mix | 96,205 | |
| 8 December | Glory Days | Little Mix | 57,151 | |
| 15 December | Blue & Lonesome | The Rolling Stones | 105,830 | |
| 22 December | Together | Michael Ball & Alfie Boe | 96,643 | |
| 29 December | Together | Michael Ball & Alfie Boe | 109,708 | |

=== Number-one compilation albums ===
Key
| † | Best-selling compilation of the year |

| Chart date (week ending) | Album | Sales | References |
|---|---|---|---|
| 7 January | Now 92 | 54,811 | |
| 14 January | Now 92 | 22,215 | |
| 21 January | Go Hard or Go Home | 16,413 | |
| 28 January | Acoustic Cafe | 14,093 | |
| 4 February | Acoustic Cafe | 14,164 | |
| 11 February | Throwback Slow Jamz | 25,152 | |
| 18 February | Throwback Slow Jamz | 21,800 | |
| 25 February | Throwback Slow Jamz | 17,731 | |
| 3 March | Brit Awards 2016 | 11,751 | |
| 10 March | Sing Your Heart Out 2016 | 20,532 | |
| 17 March | Sing Your Heart Out 2016 | 21,036 | |
| 24 March | Sing Your Heart Out 2016 | 20,820 | |
| 31 March | Now 93 | 246,889 | |
| 7 April | Now 93 | 149,467 | |
| 14 April | Now 93 | 81,598 | |
| 21 April | Now 93 | 50,936 | |
| 28 April | Now 93 | 36,873 | |
| 5 May | Now 93 | 29,106 | |
| 12 May | Now 93 | 27,431 | |
| 19 May | 100% Clubland | | |
| 26 May | Now 93 | 18,694 | |
| 2 June | 100% Clubland | 19,467 | |
| 9 June | Now 93 | 18,252 | |
| 16 June | 100% Clubland | 14,629 | |
| 23 June | Throwback Summer Jamz | 30,228 | |
| 30 June | Throwback Summer Jamz | | |
| 7 July | Throwback Summer Jamz | 23,569 | |
| 14 July | Now Summer Hits | 22,339 | |
| 21 July | Now Summer Hits | 16,958 | |
| 28 July | Now Summer Hits | 16,462 | |
| 4 August | Now 94 | 216,560 | |
| 11 August | Now 94 | 117,412 | |
| 18 August | Now 94 | 69,408 | |
| 25 August | Now 94 | 48,029 | |
| 1 September | Now 94 | 33,991 | |
| 8 September | Now 94 | 29,744 | |
| 15 September | Now 94 | 22,130 | |
| 22 September | Now 94 | 20,084 | |
| 29 September | Now 94 | 16,430 | |
| 6 October | Now 94 | 15,447 | |
| 13 October | Now 94 | 14,690 | |
| 20 October | Now 94 | 12,256 | |
| 27 October | Now 94 | 11,527 | |
| 3 November | Now 20th Century | 12,681 | |
| 10 November | Funk the Disco | 13,579 | |
| 17 November | The Annual 2017 | 18,730 | |
| 24 November | Dreamboats & Petticoats: 10th Anniversary Collection | 17,949 | |
| 1 December | Now 95 † | 222,765 | |
| 8 December | Now 95 † | 159,404 | |
| 15 December | Now 95 † | 132,020 | |
| 22 December | Now 95 † | 124,948 | |
| 29 December | Now 95 † | 138,880 | |

=== Best-selling singles ===
| Combined position | Sales Position | Streaming Position | Title | Artist | Peak position | Sales | Streams | Combined sales |
|---|---|---|---|---|---|---|---|---|
| 1 | 2 | 1 | "One Dance" | Drake featuring Wizkid & Kyla | 1 | 530,000 | 142,000,000 | 1,950,000 |
| 2 | 1 | 4 | "7 Years" | Lukas Graham | 1 | | | 1,490,000 |
| 3 | 5 | 2 | "Cheap Thrills" | Sia featuring Sean Paul | 2 | | | 1,460,000 |
| 4 | 6 | 3 | "I Took a Pill in Ibiza" | Mike Posner | 1 | | | 1,380,000 |
| 5 | 7 | 5 | "This Is What You Came For" | Calvin Harris and Rihanna | 2 | | | 1,280,000 |
| 6 | | 7 | "Lush Life" | Zara Larsson | 3 | | | 1,160,000 |
| 7 | | 8 | "Closer" | The Chainsmokers featuring Halsey | 1 | | | 1,150,000 |
| 8 | | 9 | "Love Yourself" | Justin Bieber | 1 | | | 1,140,000 |
| 9 | | 6 | "Work" | Rihanna featuring Drake | 2 | | | |
| 10 | 3 | | "Can't Stop the Feeling!" | Justin Timberlake | 2 | | | |
| 11 | 8 | | "Stitches" | Shawn Mendes | 1 | | | |
| 12 | 4 | | "Dancing on My Own" | Calum Scott | 2 | | | 1,110,000 |
| 13 | 10 | | "Fast Car" | Jonas Blue featuring Dakota | 2 | | | |
| 14 | | 10 | "Cold Water" | Major Lazer featuring Justin Bieber & MØ | 1 | | | 1,060,000 |
| 15 | | | "Work from Home" | Fifth Harmony featuring Ty Dolla Sign | 2 | | | |
| 16 | | | "Sorry" | Justin Bieber | 2 (Note: Reached number 1 in 2015) | | | |
| 17 | | | "Don't Let Me Down" | The Chainsmokers featuring Daya | 2 | | | |
| 18 | | | "Too Good" | Drake featuring Rihanna | 3 | | | |
| 19 | 9 | | "Say You Won't Let Go" | James Arthur | 1 | | | |
| 20 | | | "Light It Up" | Major Lazer featuring Nyla & Fuse ODG | 7 | | | |
| 21 | | | "Hymn for the Weekend" | Coldplay | 6 | | | |
| 22 | | | "This Girl" | Kungs vs Cookin' on 3 Burners | 2 | | | |
| 23 | | | "Cake by the Ocean" | DNCE | 4 | | | |
| 24 | | | "Pillowtalk" | Zayn | 1 | | | |
| 25 | | | "Let Me Love You" | DJ Snake featuring Justin Bieber | 2 | | | |
| 26 | | | "Girls Like" | Tinie Tempah featuring Zara Larsson | 5 | | | |
| 27 | | | "Treat You Better" | Shawn Mendes | 6 | | | |
| 28 | | | "Faded" | Alan Walker | 7 | | | |
| 29 | | | "Perfect Strangers" | Jonas Blue featuring JP Cooper | 2 | | | |
| 30 | | | "No Money" | Galantis | 4 | | | |
| 31 | | | "Stressed Out" | Twenty One Pilots | 12 | | | |
| 32 | | | "I Hate U, I Love U" | Gnash featuring Olivia O'Brien | 7 | | | |
| 33 | | | "Tears" | Clean Bandit featuring Louisa Johnson | 5 | | | |
| 34 | | | "Starboy" | The Weeknd featuring Daft Punk | 2 | | | |
| 35 | | | "What Do You Mean?" | Justin Bieber | 3 (Note: Reached number 1 in 2015) | | | |
| 36 | | | "Panda" | Desiigner | 7 | | | |
| 37 | | | "Rockabye" | Clean Bandit featuring Sean Paul & Anne-Marie | 1 | | | |
| 38 | | | "Heathens" | Twenty One Pilots | 5 | | | |
| 39 | | | "Shout Out to My Ex" | Little Mix | 1 | | | |
| 40 | | | "All My Friends" | Snakehips featuring Tinashe & Chance the Rapper | 5 | | | |
| 41 | | | "Secret Love Song" | Little Mix featuring Jason Derulo | 6 | | | |
| 42 | | | "Adventure of a Lifetime" | Coldplay | 8 (Note: Reached number 7 in 2015) | | | |
| 43 | | | "Controlla" | Drake | 18 | | | |
| 44 | | | "Me, Myself & I" | G-Eazy & Bebe Rexha | 13 | | | |
| 45 | | | "History" | One Direction | 6 | | | |
| 46 | | | "Into You" | Ariana Grande | 14 | | | |
| 47 | | | "Middle" | DJ Snake featuring Bipolar Sunshine | 10 | | | |
| 48 | | | "Hello" | Adele | 3 (Note: Reached number 1 in 2015) | | | |
| 49 | | | "Side to Side" | Ariana Grande featuring Nicki Minaj | 4 | | | |
| 50 | | | "The Greatest" | Sia featuring Kendrick Lamar | 5 | | | |

=== Best-selling albums ===
| No. | Title | Artist | Peak position | Combined sales |
|---|---|---|---|---|
| 1 | 25 | Adele | 1 | 753,000 |
| 2 | A Head Full of Dreams | Coldplay | 1 | 512,000 |
| 3 | Together | Michael Ball & Alfie Boe | 1 | |
| 4 | Purpose | Justin Bieber | 2 | 478,500 |
| 5 | The Wonder of You | Elvis Presley | 1 | 458,000 |
| 6 | Blackstar | David Bowie | 1 | 410,000 |
| 7 | Glory Days | Little Mix | 1 | 409,000 |
| 8 | Views | Drake | 1 | 387,000 |
| 9 | I Cry When I Laugh | Jess Glynne | 2 (Note: Reached number 1 in 2015) | |
| 10 | Best of Bowie | David Bowie | 1 | 328,500 |
| 11 | Lemonade | Beyoncé | 1 | 328,000 |
| 12 | 24 Hrs | Olly Murs | 1 | 304,000 |
| 13 | Nobody but Me | Michael Bublé | 2 | |
| 14 | The Heavy Entertainment Show | Robbie Williams | 1 | |
| 15 | Get Weird | Little Mix | 6 (Note: Reached number 2 in 2015) | |
| 16 | This Is Acting | Sia | 3 | |
| 17 | Blue & Lonesome | The Rolling Stones | 1 | |
| 18 | 50 | Rick Astley | 1 | |
| 19 | Chaos and the Calm | James Bay | 5 (Note: Reached number 1 in 2015) | |
| 20 | x | Ed Sheeran | 9 (Note: Reached number 1 in 2014) | |
| 21 | All Over the World: The Very Best of Electric Light Orchestra | Electric Light Orchestra | 1 | |
| 22 | If I Can Dream | Elvis Presley | 2 (Note: Reached number 1 in 2015) | |
| 23 | Christmas | Michael Bublé | 6 (Note: Reached number 1 in 2011) | |
| 24 | 24K Magic | Bruno Mars | 3 | |
| 25 | I Like It When You Sleep, for You Are So Beautiful yet So Unaware of It | The 1975 | 1 | |
| 26 | Long Live the Angels | Emeli Sandé | 2 | |
| 27 | Blurryface | Twenty One Pilots | 5 | |
| 28 | A Moon Shaped Pool | Radiohead | 1 | |
| 29 | The Singles | Phil Collins | 2 | |
| 30 | Back from the Edge | James Arthur | 1 | |
| 31 | Legend | Bob Marley and the Wailers | 5 (Note: Reached number 1 in 1984) | |
| 32 | Anti | Rihanna | 7 | |
| 33 | Chaleur Humaine | Christine and the Queens | 2 | |
| 34 | Communion | Years & Years | 11 (Note: Reached number 1 in 2015) | |
| 35 | Upon a Different Shore | Alexander Armstrong | 8 | |
| 36 | Walls | Kings of Leon | 1 | |
| 37 | Beauty Behind the Madness | The Weeknd | 13 (Note: Reached number 1 in 2015) | |
| 38 | Delirium | Ellie Goulding | 11 (Note: Reached number 3 in 2015) | |
| 39 | Nine Track Mind | Charlie Puth | 6 | |
| 40 | Nothing Has Changed | David Bowie | 5 | |
| 41 | The Ride | Catfish and the Bottlemen | 1 | |
| 42 | The Very Best of Prince | Prince | 2 | |
| 43 | In the Lonely Hour | Sam Smith | 11 (Note: Reached number 1 in 2014) | |
| 44 | 1989 | Taylor Swift | 8 (Note: Reached number 1 in 2014) | |
| 45 | Falling in Love | André Rieu & Johann Strauss Orchestra | 7 | |
| 46 | Back to Black | Amy Winehouse | 20 (Note: Reached number 1 in 2007) | |
| 47 | 21 | Adele | 10 (Note: Reached number 1 in 2011) | |
| 48 | Death of a Bachelor | Panic! at the Disco | 4 | |
| 49 | Just... Fabulous Rock 'n' Roll | Cliff Richard | 4 | |
| 50 | Wild World | Bastille | 1 | |

== Deaths ==
- 4 January – Robert Stigwood, Australian-born band manager (Bee Gees, Cream) and film producer (Grease, Saturday Night Fever), 81 (death announced on this date)
- 10 January – David Bowie, singer-songwriter and actor, 69
- 17 January – Dale Griffin, drummer (Mott the Hoople), 67 (Alzheimer's disease)
- 24 January – Jimmy Bain, Scottish bassist (Rainbow, Dio), 68
- 26 January – Colin Vearncombe (aka Black), singer-songwriter, 53 (head injuries sustained in a traffic collision)
- 9 February – Roy Harris, folk singer, 82
- 13 February – Members of Viola Beach:
  - Kris Leonard, 20, singer and guitarist
  - Jack Dakin, 19, drummer
  - Tomas Lowe, 27, bassist
  - River Reeves, 19, guitarist
  - Craig Tarry, 32, manager (road accident)
- 16 February – Gwyneth George, concert cellist and music academic, 95
- 18 February – Brendan Healy, 59, actor and musician
- 19 February – Vi Subversa, musician (Poison Girls), 80
- 25 February – John Chilton, jazz musician and writer, 83
- 1 March – Louise Plowright, musical theatre actress, 59 (pancreatic cancer)
- 8 March – Sir George Martin, Grammy-winning producer and composer, 90
- 9 March – Jon English, English-born Australian musician and actor, 66 (complications from surgery)
- 10 March – Keith Emerson, keyboardist (Emerson, Lake and Palmer), 71 (self-inflicted gunshot wound)
- 14 March – Sir Peter Maxwell Davies, composer and conductor, Master of the Queen's Music (2004–2014), 81
- 4 April – Royston Nash, conductor, 82
- 12 April – Alan Loveday, violinist, 88
- 15 April – Guy Woolfenden, composer and conductor, 78
- 25 May – Peggy Spencer, dancer and choreographer, 95
- 31 May – Tim Feild, musician (The Springfields), 82
- 3 June – Dave Swarbrick, folk musician and singer-songwriter (Fairport Convention), 75
- 14 June – Henry McCullough, guitarist (Paul McCartney & Wings), 72
- 22 June
  - Mike Hart, singer-songwriter, 72
  - Harry Rabinowitz, composer and conductor, 100
- 2 July – David Patrick Gedge, organist, 77
- 13 July – Steven Young, musician (Colourbox, M/A/R/R/S), 53
- 17 July – Fred Tomlinson, singer (The Two Ronnies, Monty Python's Flying Circus), composer ("The Lumberjack Song") and critic, 88
- 24 July – Keith Gemmell, saxophonist, clarinetist (Audience), 68
- 26 July – Paul Robertson, violinist and leader of the Medici String Quartet, 63
- 29 July – Ken Barrie, voice actor and singer, 83
- 30 July – Nigel Gray, record producer (Outlandos d'Amour), 69
- 14 August – Neil Black, oboist, 84
- 19 August – Derek Smith, jazz pianist, 85 (death announced on this date)
- 22 August – Gilli Smyth, singer (Gong), 83
- 28 August – John Stenhouse, orchestral bass clarinetist, 74
- 12 September – Hidayat Inayat Khan, composer and conductor, 99
- 30 September – Michael Casswell, guitarist, 53
- 2 October
  - Sir Neville Marriner, conductor and violinist, 92
  - Thomas Round, opera singer, 100
- 5 October – Rod Temperton, songwriter, producer and musician (Heatwave), 68
- 7 October – Anne Pashley, Olympic athlete and opera singer, 80
- 23 October – Pete Burns, singer (Dead or Alive), 57 (cardiac arrest)
- 7 November – Sir Jimmy Young, singer and DJ, 95
- 11 November – George Reynolds, orchestral trumpeter, 78
- 22 November – Craig Gill, drummer (Inspiral Carpets), 44
- 1 December – Micky Fitz, punk singer (The Business) (death announced this date)
- 7 December – Greg Lake, singer, musician, producer (King Crimson), (Emerson, Lake & Palmer), 69 (cancer)
- 24 December – Rick Parfitt, singer, musician, (Status Quo), 68 (septicaemia)
- 25 December – George Michael, singer, 53

== See also ==
- 2016 in British radio
- 2016 in British television
- 2016 in the United Kingdom
- List of British films of 2016
