= List of UK Independent Albums Chart number ones of 2016 =

These are the Official Charts Company's UK Independent Albums Chart number ones of 2016.

== Chart history ==
Key
†	Best-selling indie album of the year

Issue date	Album	Artist(s)	Record label	Ref.
1 January	25 †	Adele	XL	
8 January	25 †	Adele	XL	
15 January	25 †	Adele	XL	
22 January	25 †	Adele	XL	
29 January	25 †	Adele	XL	
5 February	25 †	Adele	XL	
12 February	25 †	Adele	XL	
19 February	25 †	Adele	XL	
26 February	25 †	Adele	XL	
4 March	25 †	Adele	XL	
11 March	25 †	Adele	XL	
18 March	25 †	Adele	XL	
25 March	25 †	Adele	XL	
1 April	25 †	Adele	XL	
8 April	Everything You've Come to Expect	The Last Shadow Puppets	Domino	
15 April	25 †	Adele	XL	
22 April	25 †	Adele	XL	
29 April	25 †	Adele	XL	
6 May	25 †	Adele	XL	
13 May	A Moon Shaped Pool	Radiohead	XL	
20 May	A Moon Shaped Pool	Radiohead	XL	
27 May	These People	Richard Ashcroft	Righteous Phonographic Association	
3 June	25 †	Adele	XL	
10 June	Facing Time	Bugzy Malone	Il Gotten	
17 June	50	Rick Astley	BMG	
24 June	A Moon Shaped Pool	Radiohead	XL	
1 July	25 †	Adele	XL	
8 July	California	Blink-182	BMG	
15 July	25 †	Adele	XL	
22 July	Chaleur Humaine	Christine and the Queens	Because Music	
29 July	Chaleur Humaine	Christine and the Queens	Because Music	
5 August	Chaleur Humaine	Christine and the Queens	Because Music	
12 August	Landlord	Giggs	SNL	
19 August	Chaleur Humaine	Christine and the Queens	Because Music	
26 August	Blonde	Frank Ocean	Boys Don't Cry	
2 September	Blonde	Frank Ocean	Boys Don't Cry	
9 September	Foreverland	The Divine Comedy	Divine Comedy	
16 September	Skeleton Tree	Nick Cave and the Bad Seeds	Bad Seed	
23 September	Skeleton Tree	Nick Cave and the Bad Seeds	Bad Seed	
30 September	Young as the Morning, Old as the Sea	Passenger	Black Crow	
7 October	22, A Million	Bon Iver	Jagjaguwar	
14 October	The Last Hero	Alter Bridge	Napalm	
21 October	Like an Arrow	Blackberry Smoke	Earache	
28 October	In Winter	Katie Melua	BMG	
4 November	Mapping the Rendezvous	Courteeners	Ignition	
11 November	I Have a Dream	Daniel O'Donnell	DMG T.V	
18 November	Unfinished Business	Nathan Sykes	Global Music	
25 November	50	Rick Astley	BMG	
2 December	50	Rick Astley	BMG	
9 December	25 †	Adele	XL	
16 December	50	Rick Astley	BMG	
23 December	25 †	Adele	XL	
30 December	50	Rick Astley	BMG	

== See also ==
- List of UK Rock & Metal Albums Chart number ones of 2016
- List of UK Albums Chart number ones of 2016
- List of UK Dance Albums Chart number ones of 2016
- List of UK Album Downloads Chart number ones of 2016
- List of UK R&B Albums Chart number ones of 2016
- List of UK Independent Singles Chart number ones of 2016
