= List of UK Independent Singles Chart number ones of 2016 =

These are the Official Charts Company's UK Independent Singles Chart number-one singles of 2016.

== Chart history ==
Key
†	Best-selling indie single of the year

Chart date (week ending)	Song	Artist(s)	Record label	References
7 January	"Hello"	Adele	XL	
14 January	"Hello"	Adele	XL	
21 January	"Sweet Lovin'"	Sigala featuring Bryn Christopher	Ministry of Sound	
28 January	"Hello"	Adele	XL	
4 February	"Light It Up"	Major Lazer featuring Nyla and Fuse ODG	Because Music	
11 February	"Light It Up"	Major Lazer featuring Nyla and Fuse ODG	Because Music	
18 February	"Light It Up"	Major Lazer featuring Nyla and Fuse ODG	Because Music	
25 February	"Swings & Waterslides"	Viola Beach	Fuller Beans	
3 March	"Light It Up"	Major Lazer featuring Nyla and Fuse ODG	Because Music	
10 March	"When We Were Young"	Adele	XL	
17 March	"Light It Up"	Major Lazer featuring Nyla and Fuse ODG	Because Music	
24 March	"Light It Up"	Major Lazer featuring Nyla and Fuse ODG	Because Music	
31 March	"Say You Do"	Sigala featuring DJ Fresh and Imani Williams	Ministry Of Sound	
7 April	"Say You Do"	Sigala featuring DJ Fresh and Imani Williams	Ministry Of Sound	
14 April	"Light It Up"	Major Lazer featuring Nyla and Fuse ODG	Because Music	
21 April	"Light It Up"	Major Lazer featuring Nyla and Fuse ODG	Because Music	
28 April	"Light It Up"	Major Lazer featuring Nyla and Fuse ODG	Because Music	
5 May	"Light It Up"	Major Lazer featuring Nyla and Fuse ODG	Because Music	
12 May	"Light It Up"	Major Lazer featuring Nyla and Fuse ODG	Because Music	
19 May	"Light It Up"	Major Lazer featuring Nyla and Fuse ODG	Because Music	
26 May	"Light It Up"	Major Lazer featuring Nyla and Fuse ODG	Because Music	
2 June	"Light It Up"	Major Lazer featuring Nyla and Fuse ODG	Because Music	
9 June	"Light It Up"	Major Lazer featuring Nyla and Fuse ODG	Because Music	
16 June	"Send My Love (To Your New Lover)"	Adele	XL	
23 June	"I'll Be There"	The Neales	ZY	
30 June	"Give Me Your Love"	Sigala featuring John Newman and Nile Rodgers	Ministry of Sound	
7 July	"Send My Love (To Your New Lover)"	Adele	XL	
14 July	"Send My Love (To Your New Lover)"	Adele	XL	
21 July	"Send My Love (To Your New Lover)"	Adele	XL	
28 July	"Send My Love (To Your New Lover)"	Adele	XL	
4 August ^{[a]}	"Cold Water" †	Major Lazer featuring Justin Bieber and MØ	Because Music	
11 August ^{[a]}	"Cold Water" †	Major Lazer featuring Justin Bieber and MØ	Because Music	
18 August ^{[a]}	"Cold Water" †	Major Lazer featuring Justin Bieber and MØ	Because Music	
25 August ^{[a]}	"Cold Water" †	Major Lazer featuring Justin Bieber and MØ	Because Music	
1 September ^{[a]}	"Cold Water" †	Major Lazer featuring Justin Bieber and MØ	Because Music	
8 September	"Cold Water" †	Major Lazer featuring Justin Bieber and MØ	Because Music	
15 September	"Cold Water" †	Major Lazer featuring Justin Bieber and MØ	Because Music	
22 September	"Cold Water" †	Major Lazer featuring Justin Bieber and MØ	Because Music	
29 September	"Cold Water" †	Major Lazer featuring Justin Bieber and MØ	Because Music	
6 October	"Cold Water" †	Major Lazer featuring Justin Bieber and MØ	Because Music	
13 October	"Cold Water" †	Major Lazer featuring Justin Bieber and MØ	Because Music	
20 October	"Cold Water" †	Major Lazer featuring Justin Bieber and MØ	Because Music	
27 October	"Cold Water" †	Major Lazer featuring Justin Bieber and MØ	Because Music	
3 November	"Cold Water" †	Major Lazer featuring Justin Bieber and MØ	Because Music	
10 November	"Cold Water" †	Major Lazer featuring Justin Bieber and MØ	Because Music	
17 November	"Cold Water" †	Major Lazer featuring Justin Bieber and MØ	Because Music	
24 November	"Cold Water" †	Major Lazer featuring Justin Bieber and MØ	Because Music	
1 December	"Cold Water" †	Major Lazer featuring Justin Bieber and MØ	Because Music	
8 December	"Cold Water" †	Major Lazer featuring Justin Bieber and MØ	Because Music	
15 December	"Cold Water" †	Major Lazer featuring Justin Bieber and MØ	Because Music	
22 December	"Cold Water" †	Major Lazer featuring Justin Bieber and MØ	Because Music	
29 December	"Glad All Over"	The Dave Clark Five	Dave Clark	

== Notes ==
- ^{a} – The single was simultaneously number-one on the singles chart.

== Number-one Indie artists ==
Position	Artist	Weeks at number one
1	Major Lazer	36
2	Adele	9
3	Sigala	4
4	DJ Fresh (as featuring)	2
4	Imani Williams (as featuring)	2
5	The Dave Clark Five	1
5	The Neales	1
5	Viola Beach	1

== See also ==
- List of UK Dance Singles Chart number ones of 2016
- List of UK R&B Singles Chart number ones of 2016
- List of UK Rock & Metal Singles Chart number ones of 2016
- List of UK Independent Albums Chart number ones of 2016
