= List of UK Dance Albums Chart number ones of 2016 =

These are the Official Charts Company's UK Dance Albums Chart number ones of 2016. The chart week runs from Friday to Thursday with the chart-date given as the following Thursday.

== Chart history ==
Issue date	Album	Artist(s)	Record label	Ref.
7 January	The Annual 2016	Various Artists	Ministry of Sound	
14 January	The Annual 2016	Various Artists	Ministry of Sound	
21 January	Go Hard or Go Home	Various Artists	Ministry of Sound	
28 January	Go Hard or Go Home	Various Artists	Ministry of Sound	
4 February	Go Hard or Go Home	Various Artists	Ministry of Sound	
11 February	Go Hard or Go Home	Various Artists	Ministry of Sound	
18 February	Opus	Eric Prydz	Virgin	
25 February	Grime Time	Various Artists	Ministry of Sound	
3 March	Grime Time	Various Artists	Ministry of Sound	
10 March	Clubbers Guide 2016	Various Artists	Ministry of Sound	
17 March	Pure Running	Various Artists	New State	
24 March	House Every Weekend Vol. 2	Various Artists	Ministry of Sound	
31 March	Back to Bass	Various Artists	Ministry of Sound	
7 April	Get Ready for This	Various Artists	U.M.T.V.	
14 April	Get Ready for This	Various Artists	U.M.T.V.	
21 April	Pure Running	Various Artists	New State	
28 April	Pure Running	Various Artists	New State	
5 May	Pure Running	Various Artists	New State	
12 May	For the Love of Trance	Various Artists	U.M.T.V.	
19 May	100% Clubland	Various Artists	U.M.T.V.	
26 May	Cloud Nine	Kygo	Sony, Ultra	
2 June	100% Clubland	Various Artists	U.M.T.V.	
9 June	100% Clubland	Various Artists	U.M.T.V.	
16 June	100% Clubland	Various Artists	U.M.T.V.	
23 June	100% Clubland	Various Artists	U.M.T.V.	
30 June	I Love Summer	Various Artists	Ministry of Sound	
7 July	Marbella Collection 2016	Various Artists	Ministry of Sound	
14 July	I Love Summer	Various Artists	Ministry of Sound	
21 July	Beach Club	Various Artists	U.M.T.V.	
28 July	I Love Summer	Various Artists	Ministry of Sound	
4 August	Tropical House	Various Artists	Ministry of Sound	
11 August	Twenty	Chicane	Modena	
18 August	Encore	DJ Snake	Interscope	
25 August	The Workout Mix With Team GB	Various Artists	UMOD	
1 September	Now That's What I Call Dance Hits	Various Artists	Sony/Virgin	
8 September	House X Garage	Various Artists	Ministry of Sound	
15 September	House X Garage	Various Artists	Ministry of Sound	
22 September	The Running Bug 4	Various Artists	Ministry of Sound	
29 September	The Running Bug 4	Various Artists	Ministry of Sound	
6 October	The Running Bug 4	Various Artists	Ministry of Sound	
13 October	Following My Intuition	Craig David	Speaker Boxx Recordings	
20 October	Annie Mac Presents 2016	Various Artists	Virgin	
27 October	Following My Intuition	Craig David	Speaker Boxx Recordings	
3 November	Hacienda Classical	Graeme Park/Mike Pickering/Pete Hook	Sony Classical	
10 November	Clubland 2017	Various Artists	U.M.T.V.	
17 November	Annual 2017	Various Artists	Ministry of Sound	
24 November	Annual 2017	Various Artists	Ministry of Sound	
1 December	I Love 90's	Various Artists	Ministry of Sound	
8 December	Classic House	Pete Tong, The Heritage Orchestra & Jules Buckley	U.M.C.	
15 December	Classic House	Pete Tong, The Heritage Orchestra & Jules Buckley	U.M.C.	
22 December	I Love 90's	Various Artists	Ministry of Sound	
29 December	I Love 90's	Various Artists	Ministry of Sound	

== See also ==
- List of UK Albums Chart number ones of 2016
- List of UK Dance Singles Chart number ones of 2016
- List of UK Album Downloads Chart number ones of 2016
- List of UK Independent Albums Chart number ones of 2016
- List of UK R&B Albums Chart number ones of 2016
- List of UK Rock & Metal Albums Chart number ones of 2016
- List of UK Compilation Chart number ones of the 2010s
