= List of UK Dance Singles Chart number ones of 2016 =

The UK Dance Singles Chart is a weekly music chart compiled in the United Kingdom by the Official Charts Company (OCC) from sales of songs in the dance music genre (house, drum and bass, dubstep, etc.) in record stores and digital downloads. The chart week runs from Friday to Thursday with the chart-date given as the following Thursday.

This is a list of the songs which were number one on the UK Dance Singles Chart during 2016.

== Chart history ==
Key
†	Best-performing dance single of the year

Chart date (week ending)	Song	Artist(s)	References
7 January	"Sweet Lovin'"	Sigala featuring Bryn Christopher	
14 January	"Sweet Lovin'"	Sigala featuring Bryn Christopher	
21 January	"Sweet Lovin'"	Sigala featuring Bryn Christopher	
28 January	"The Girl Is Mine"	99 Souls featuring Destiny's Child & Brandy	
4 February	"Fast Car"	Jonas Blue featuring Dakota	
11 February	"Fast Car"	Jonas Blue featuring Dakota	
18 February	"Fast Car"	Jonas Blue featuring Dakota	
25 February	"Fast Car"	Jonas Blue featuring Dakota	
3 March	"Fast Car"	Jonas Blue featuring Dakota	
10 March	"Fast Car"	Jonas Blue featuring Dakota	
17 March	"Fast Car"	Jonas Blue featuring Dakota	
24 March	"Fast Car"	Jonas Blue featuring Dakota	
31 March	"Say You Do"	Sigala featuring Imani Williams & DJ Fresh	
7 April ^{[a]}	"I Took a Pill in Ibiza" †	Mike Posner	
14 April ^{[a]}	"I Took a Pill in Ibiza" †	Mike Posner	
21 April	"I Took a Pill in Ibiza" †	Mike Posner	
28 April	"I Took a Pill in Ibiza" †	Mike Posner	
5 May	"I Took a Pill in Ibiza" †	Mike Posner	
12 May	"This Is What You Came For"	Calvin Harris featuring Rihanna	
19 May	"This Is What You Came For"	Calvin Harris featuring Rihanna	
26 May	"This Is What You Came For"	Calvin Harris featuring Rihanna	
2 June	"This Is What You Came For"	Calvin Harris featuring Rihanna	
9 June	"This Is What You Came For"	Calvin Harris featuring Rihanna	
16 June	"This Is What You Came For"	Calvin Harris featuring Rihanna	
23 June	"This Girl"	Kungs vs. Cookin' on 3 Burners	
30 June	"This Girl"	Kungs vs. Cookin' on 3 Burners	
7 July	"This Girl"	Kungs vs. Cookin' on 3 Burners	
14 July	"This Girl"	Kungs vs. Cookin' on 3 Burners	
21 July	"Don't Let Me Down"	The Chainsmokers featuring Daya	
28 July	"Perfect Strangers"	Jonas Blue featuring JP Cooper	
4 August ^{[a]}	"Cold Water"	Major Lazer featuring Justin Bieber & MØ	
11 August ^{[a]}	"Cold Water"	Major Lazer featuring Justin Bieber & MØ	
18 August ^{[a]}	"Cold Water"	Major Lazer featuring Justin Bieber & MØ	
25 August ^{[a]}	"Cold Water"	Major Lazer featuring Justin Bieber & MØ	
1 September ^{[a]}	"Cold Water"	Major Lazer featuring Justin Bieber & MØ	
8 September ^{[a]}	"Closer"	The Chainsmokers featuring Halsey	
15 September ^{[a]}	"Closer"	The Chainsmokers featuring Halsey	
22 September ^{[a]}	"Closer"	The Chainsmokers featuring Halsey	
29 September ^{[a]}	"Closer"	The Chainsmokers featuring Halsey	
6 October	"Closer"	The Chainsmokers featuring Halsey	
13 October	"Closer"	The Chainsmokers featuring Halsey	
20 October	"Closer"	The Chainsmokers featuring Halsey	
27 October	"Closer"	The Chainsmokers featuring Halsey	
3 November	"Closer"	The Chainsmokers featuring Halsey	
10 November	"Closer"	The Chainsmokers featuring Halsey	
17 November	"Closer"	The Chainsmokers featuring Halsey	
24 November	"Closer"	The Chainsmokers featuring Halsey	
1 December	"Closer"	The Chainsmokers featuring Halsey	
8 December	"Closer"	The Chainsmokers featuring Halsey	
15 December	"Closer"	The Chainsmokers featuring Halsey	
22 December	"Closer"	The Chainsmokers featuring Halsey	
29 December	"Closer"	The Chainsmokers featuring Halsey	

- ^{a} – the single was simultaneously number-one on the singles chart.

== Number-one artists ==
Position	Artist	Weeks at number one
1	The Chainsmokers	18
2	Jonas Blue	9
3	Calvin Harris	6
4	Major Lazer	5
4	Mike Posner	5
5	Sigala	4
5	Kungs	4
5	Cookin' on 3 Burners	4
6	99 Souls	1
6	DJ Fresh (as featuring)	1

== See also ==
- List of number-one singles of 2016 (UK)
- List of UK Dance Albums Chart number ones of 2016
- List of UK R&B Singles Chart number ones of 2016
- List of UK Rock & Metal Singles Chart number ones of 2016
- List of UK Independent Singles Chart number ones of 2016
