= List of UK Rock & Metal Singles Chart number ones of 2016 =

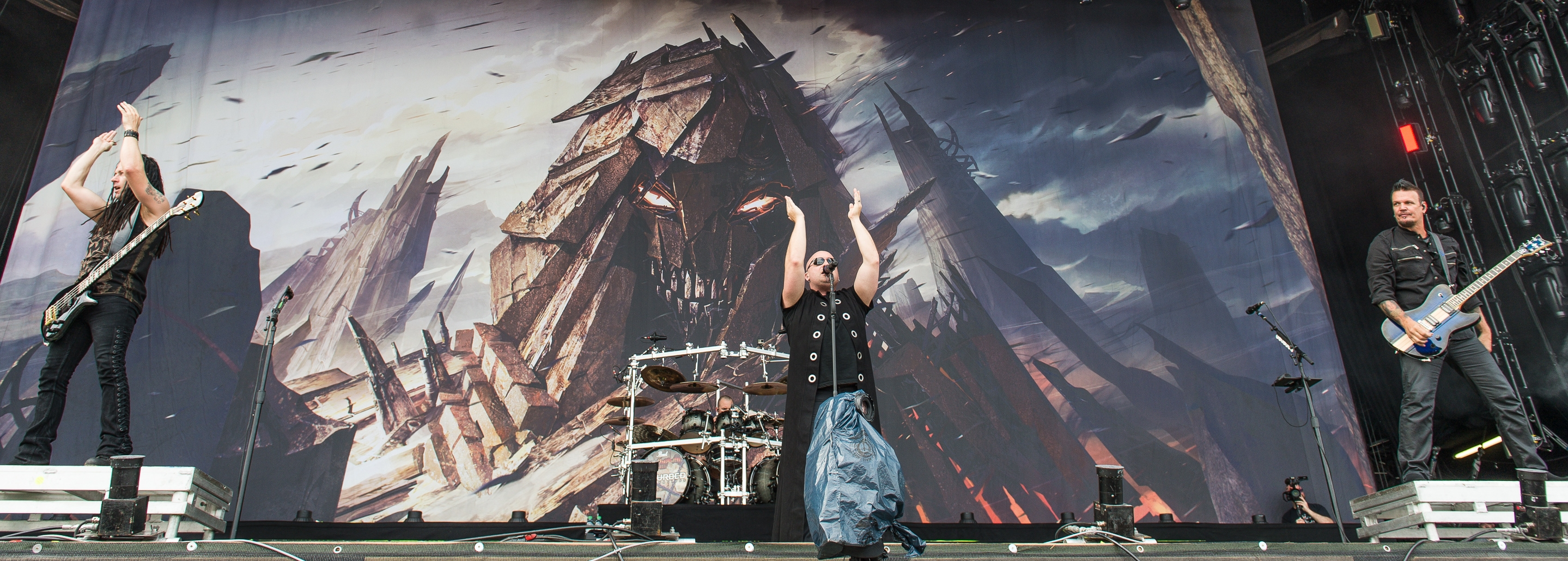
Disturbed's cover of "The Sound of Silence" was the longest-running number one single of 2016, spending 17 consecutive weeks atop the chart.

The UK Rock & Metal Singles Chart is a record chart which ranks the best-selling rock and heavy metal songs in the United Kingdom. Compiled and published by the Official Charts Company, the data is based on each track's weekly physical sales, digital downloads and streams. In 2016, there were 14 singles that topped the 52 published charts. The first number-one single of the year was Motörhead's 1980 single "Ace of Spades", which spent the first three weeks atop the chart following the death of the band's frontman Lemmy Kilmister. The final number-one single of the year was the 2003 release "Christmas Time (Don't Let the Bells End)" by The Darkness, which reached number one for the week ending 22 December and remained there for three weeks into January 2017.

The most successful song on the UK Rock & Metal Singles Chart in 2016 was Disturbed's cover version of Simon & Garfunkel's "The Sound of Silence", which spent 17 weeks running atop the chart between 21 April and 21 August. "Can't Stop" by Red Hot Chili Peppers spent 14 weeks at number one in 2016, while Fall Out Boy were number one for five weeks during the year with two singles from the album American Beauty/American Psycho – "Centuries" for two weeks and "Irresistible" for three weeks. Motörhead and Biffy Clyro each spent three weeks at number one during the year, while three more singles – "Iris" by Goo Goo Dolls, "Sweet Child o' Mine" by Guns N' Roses and "Christmas Time (Don't Let the Bells End)" by The Darkness – were all number one for two weeks each in 2016.

== Chart history ==
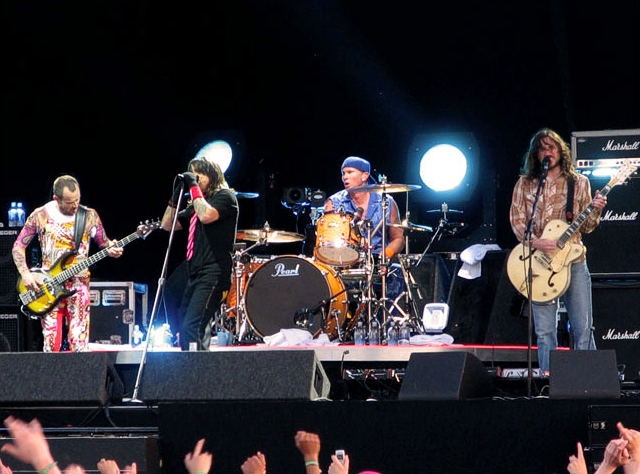
"Can't Stop" by Red Hot Chili Peppers spent 14 weeks at number one on the UK Rock & Metal Singles Chart in 2016.

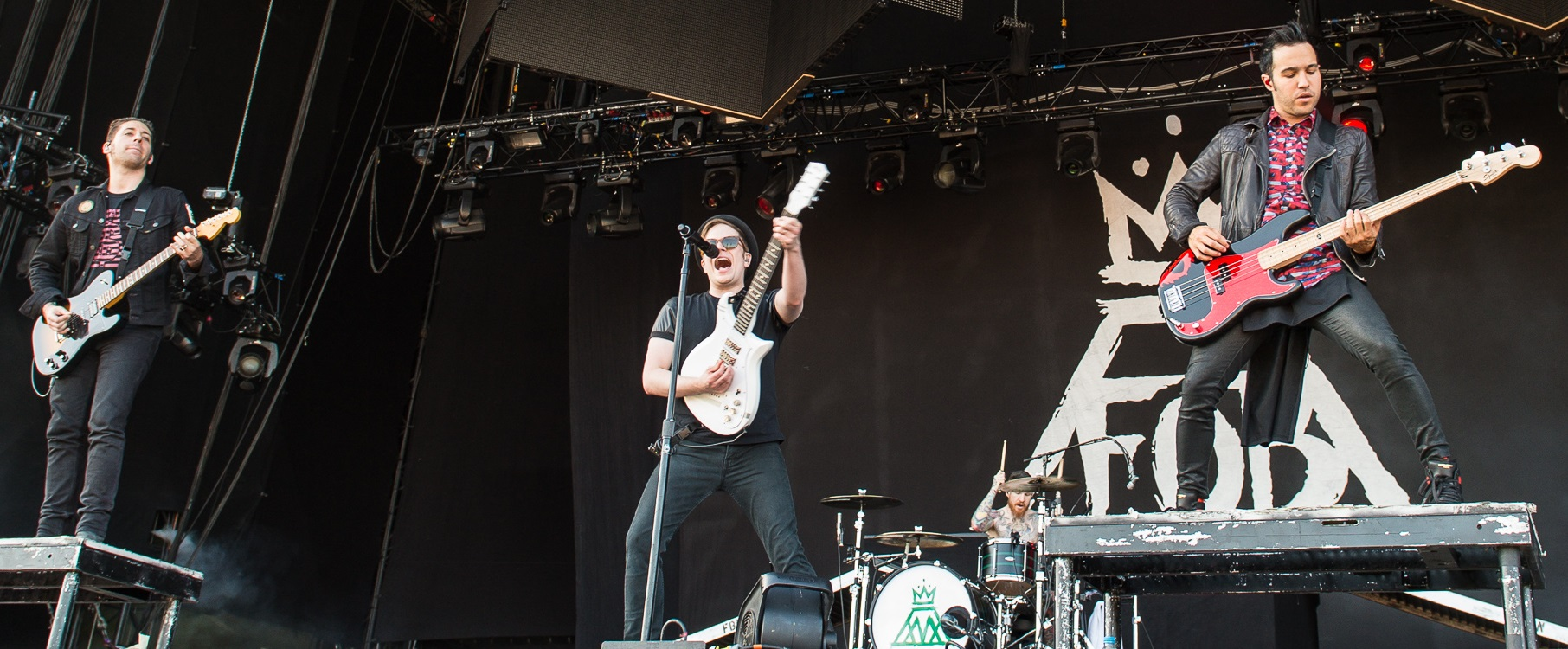
Fall Out Boy spent five weeks at number one in 2016 with two singles: "Centuries" and "Irresistible".

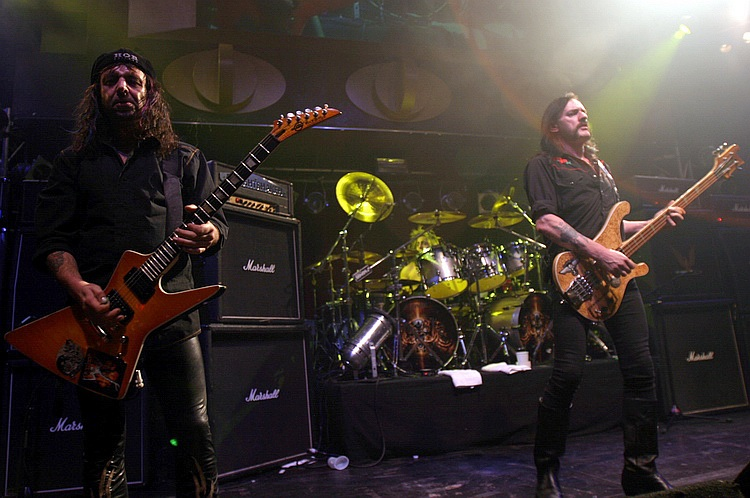
Motörhead's 1980 single "Ace of Spades" spent the first three weeks of 2016 at number one on the chart.

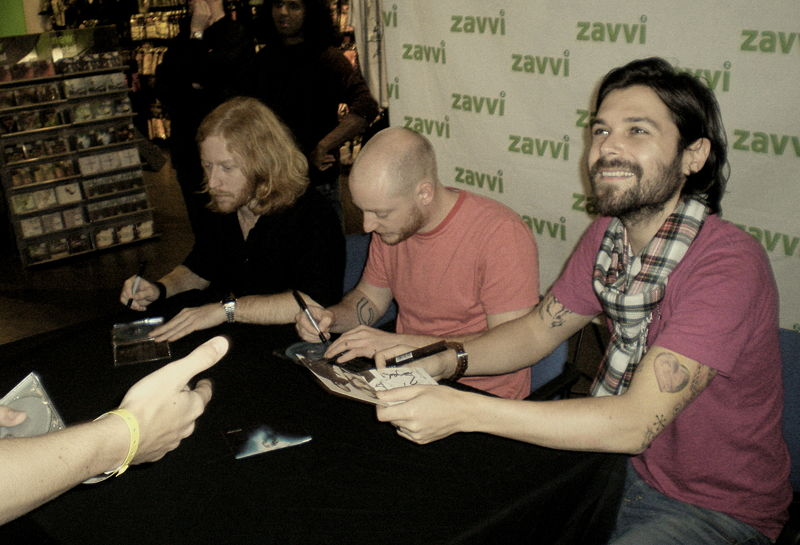
Biffy Clyro spent three weeks at number one in 2016 with "Wolves of Winter" and "Re-Arrange" (two weeks).

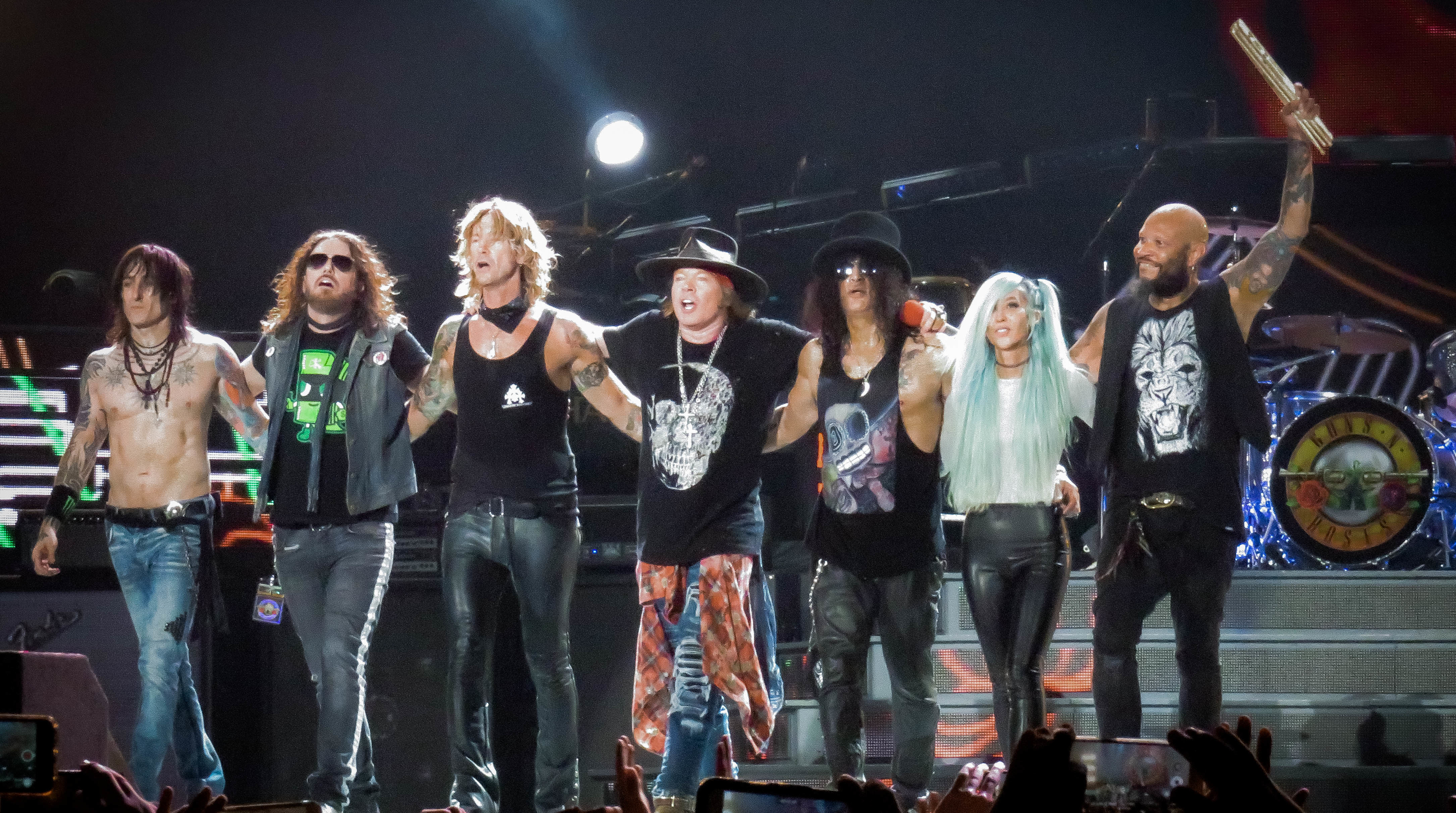
Guns N' Roses spent two weeks at number one with "Sweet Child o' Mine".

Issue date	Single	Artist(s)	Record label(s)	Ref.
7 January	"Ace of Spades"	Motörhead	Castle	
14 January	"Ace of Spades"	Motörhead	Castle	
21 January	"Ace of Spades"	Motörhead	Castle	
28 January	"Don't Threaten Me with a Good Time"	Panic! at the Disco	Fueled by Ramen	
4 February	"Centuries"	Fall Out Boy	Island	
11 February	"Irresistible"	Fall Out Boy	Def Jam	
18 February	"Iris"	Goo Goo Dolls	Warner Bros.	
25 February	"Iris"	Goo Goo Dolls	Warner Bros.	
3 March	"Irresistible"	Fall Out Boy	Def Jam	
10 March	"Irresistible"	Fall Out Boy	Def Jam	
17 March	"Centuries"	Fall Out Boy	Island	
24 March	"Paranoia"	A Day to Remember	ADTR	
31 March	"Follow You"	Bring Me the Horizon	RCA	
7 April	"Wolves of Winter"	Biffy Clyro	14th Floor	
14 April	"Sweet Child o' Mine"	Guns N' Roses	Geffen	
21 April	"The Sound of Silence"	Disturbed	Reprise	
28 April	"The Sound of Silence"	Disturbed	Reprise	
5 May	"The Sound of Silence"	Disturbed	Reprise	
12 May	"The Sound of Silence"	Disturbed	Reprise	
19 May	"The Sound of Silence"	Disturbed	Reprise	
26 May	"The Sound of Silence"	Disturbed	Reprise	
2 June	"The Sound of Silence"	Disturbed	Reprise	
9 June	"The Sound of Silence"	Disturbed	Reprise	
16 June	"The Sound of Silence"	Disturbed	Reprise	
23 June	"The Sound of Silence"	Disturbed	Reprise	
30 June	"The Sound of Silence"	Disturbed	Reprise	
7 July	"The Sound of Silence"	Disturbed	Reprise	
14 July	"The Sound of Silence"	Disturbed	Reprise	
21 July	"The Sound of Silence"	Disturbed	Reprise	
28 July	"The Sound of Silence"	Disturbed	Reprise	
4 August	"The Sound of Silence"	Disturbed	Reprise	
11 August	"The Sound of Silence"	Disturbed	Reprise	
18 August	"Sweet Child o' Mine"	Guns N' Roses	Geffen	
25 August	"Bang Bang"	Green Day	Reprise	
1 September	"Can't Stop"	Red Hot Chili Peppers	Warner Bros.	
8 September	"Can't Stop"	Red Hot Chili Peppers	Warner Bros.	
15 September	"Can't Stop"	Red Hot Chili Peppers	Warner Bros.	
22 September	"Can't Stop"	Red Hot Chili Peppers	Warner Bros.	
29 September	"Can't Stop"	Red Hot Chili Peppers	Warner Bros.	
6 October	"Can't Stop"	Red Hot Chili Peppers	Warner Bros.	
13 October	"Can't Stop"	Red Hot Chili Peppers	Warner Bros.	
20 October	"Can't Stop"	Red Hot Chili Peppers	Warner Bros.	
27 October	"Can't Stop"	Red Hot Chili Peppers	Warner Bros.	
3 November	"Can't Stop"	Red Hot Chili Peppers	Warner Bros.	
10 November	"Can't Stop"	Red Hot Chili Peppers	Warner Bros.	
17 November	"Can't Stop"	Red Hot Chili Peppers	Warner Bros.	
24 November	"Can't Stop"	Red Hot Chili Peppers	Warner Bros.	
1 December	"Can't Stop"	Red Hot Chili Peppers	Warner Bros.	
8 December	"Re-Arrange"	Biffy Clyro	14th Floor	
15 December	"Re-Arrange"	Biffy Clyro	14th Floor	
22 December	"Christmas Time (Don't Let the Bells End)"	The Darkness	Must Destroy	
29 December	"Christmas Time (Don't Let the Bells End)"	The Darkness	Must Destroy	

== See also ==
- 2016 in British music
- List of UK Rock & Metal Albums Chart number ones of 2016
