= Animal Style (song) =

Single by Biffy Clyro

from the album Ellipsis
- Released: 25 May 2016
- Recorded: 2014–16
- Studio: Eldorado Recording Studios, Los Angeles, United States
- Genre: Alternative rock
- Length: 3:30
- Label: 14th Floor
- Songwriter: Simon Neil
- Producer: Rich Costey

Biffy Clyro singles chronology
"Wolves of Winter" (2016)	"Animal Style" (2016)	"Howl" (2016)

"Animal Style" is a song by Scottish alternative rock band Biffy Clyro, and the second single (lead in the United States) from the band's seventh studio album, Ellipsis. The band first performed the song live on BBC Radio 1 at Maida Vale Studios with Annie Mac. The studio version was later released on 25 May 2016 as a digital download made available at midnight on iTunes and Spotify. "Animal Style" had its live air debut on Radio 1 with Nick Grimshaw on 25 May 2016, as the band co-hosted the morning show with Grimshaw and Jack Garratt.

== Charts ==
Chart (2016)	Peak position
Scotland Singles (OCC)	90
UK Singles (OCC)	184
