= List of UK Rock & Metal Albums Chart number ones of 2016 =

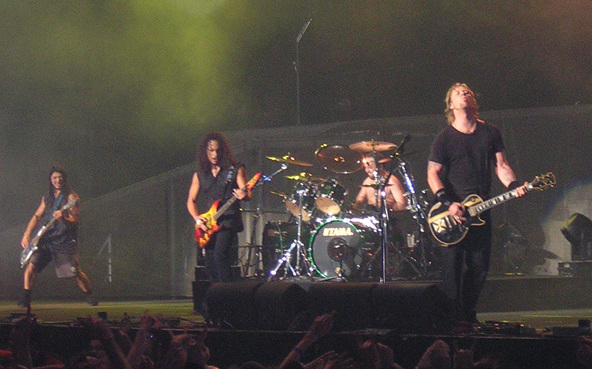
Metallica's Hardwired... to Self-Destruct was the longest-running number one album of 2016, spending the last five weeks of the year atop the chart.

The UK Rock & Metal Albums Chart is a record chart which ranks the best-selling rock and heavy metal albums in the United Kingdom. Compiled and published by the Official Charts Company, the data is based on each album's weekly physical sales, digital downloads and streams. In 2016, there were 37 albums that topped the 52 published charts. The first number-one album of the year was Alone in the Universe by Jeff Lynne's ELO, which reached the top of the chart for the week ending 26 November 2015 and remained at number one for nine consecutive weeks. The final number-one album of the year was Metallica's tenth studio album Hardwired... to Self-Destruct, which reached number one for the week ending 1 December and remained there for six consecutive weeks into January 2017.

The most successful albums on the UK Rock & Metal Albums Chart in 2016 were Metallica's Hardwired... to Self-Destruct and Disturbed's 2015 release Immortalized, both of which spent a total of five weeks at number one during the year. Hardwired... to Self-Destruct was the best-selling rock and metal album of the year, ranking 56th in the UK End of Year Albums Chart and receiving a gold certification from the British Phonographic Industry. Biffy Clyro's seventh studio album Ellipsis spent four weeks at number one during 2016, and finished as the 59th best-selling album in the UK at the end of the year. Alone in the Universe by Jeff Lynne's ELO spent three weeks at number one, while two albums – Killswitch Engage's Incarnate and Avenged Sevenfold's The Stage – spent two weeks at number one.

== Chart history ==
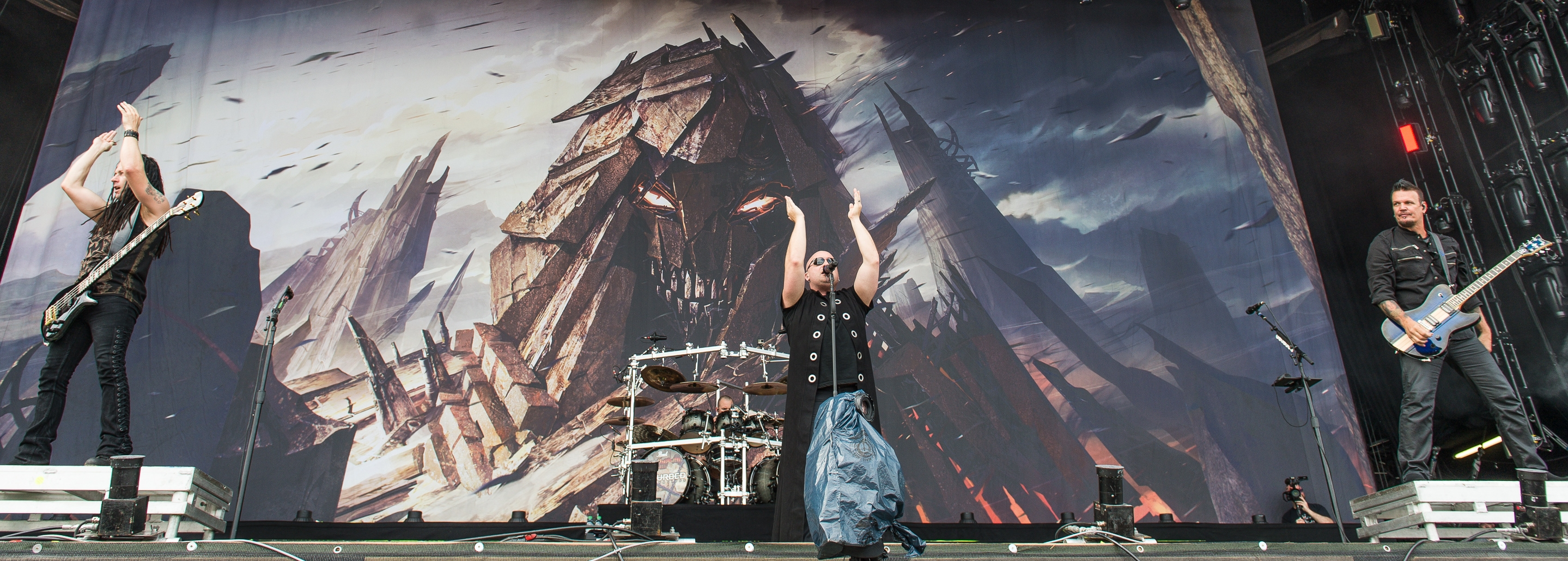
Disturbed's 2015 album Immortalized returned to the top of the chart twice in 2016, spending a total of five weeks at number one during the year.

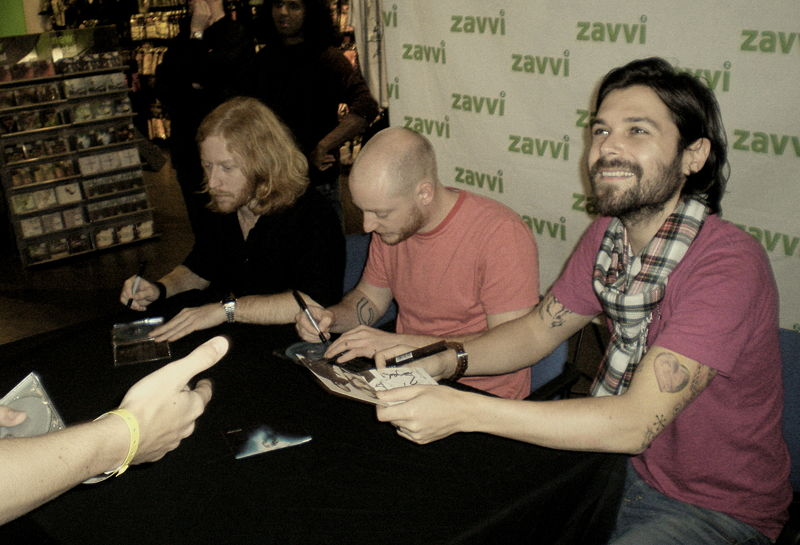
Biffy Clyro's seventh studio album Ellipsis spent four weeks at number one during 2016 over two spells.

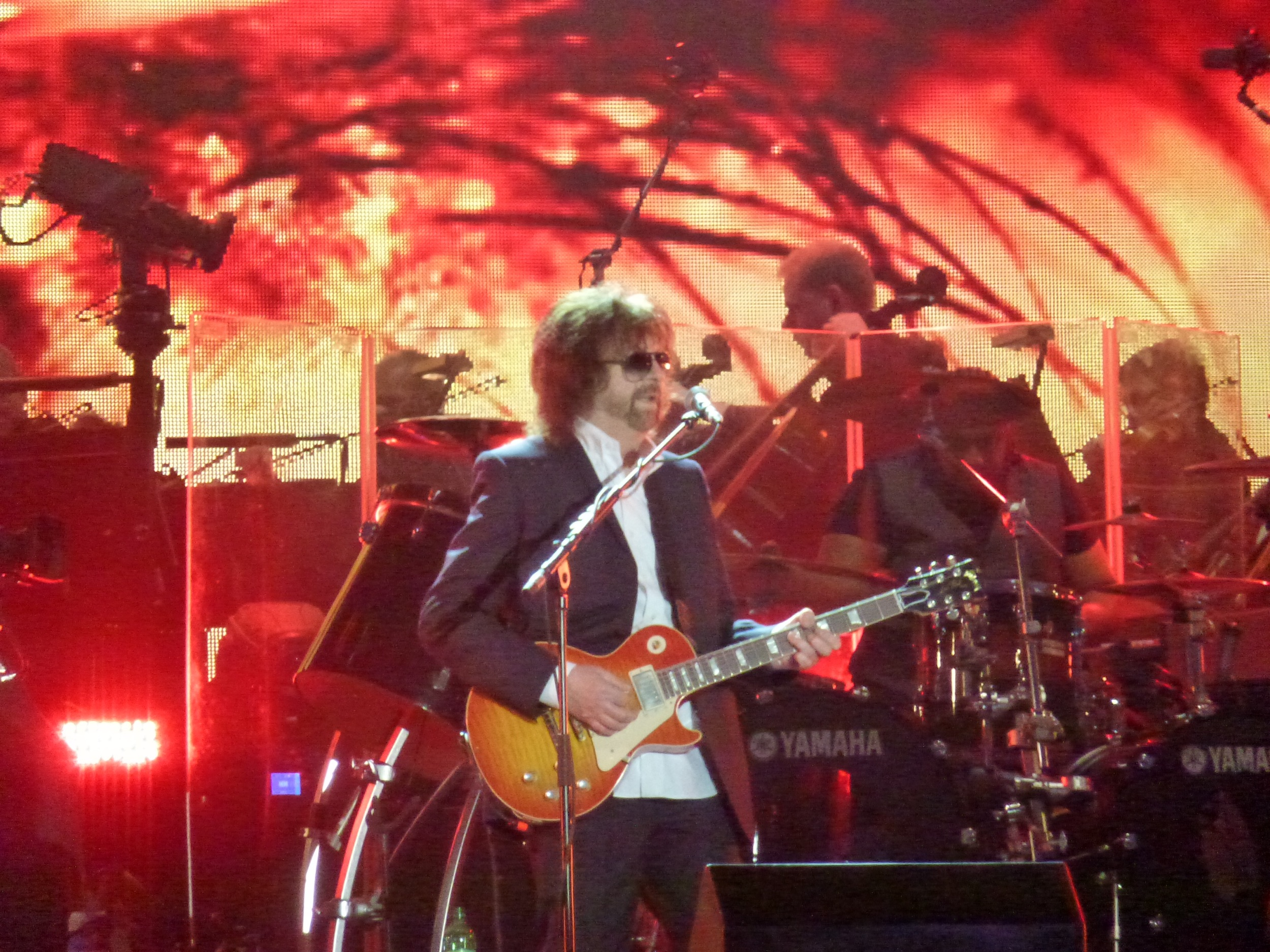
Alone in the Universe, the first album credited to Jeff Lynne's ELO, was number one for the first three weeks of the year.

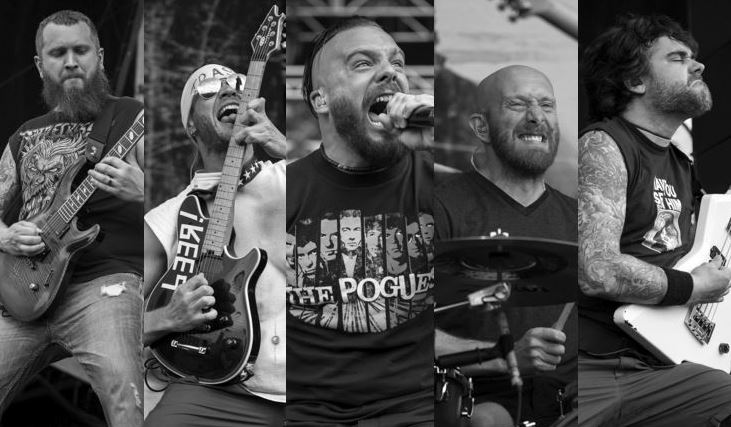
Killswitch Engage spent two weeks at number one during March 2016 with their seventh studio album Incarnate.

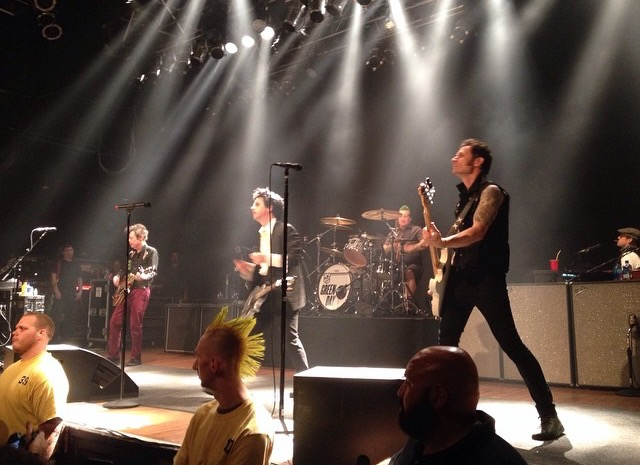
Green Day's Revolution Radio was one of three 2016 number-one albums to also top the UK Albums Chart.

Key
| † | Indicates best-selling rock album of 2016 |

| Issue date | Album | Artist(s) | Record label(s) | Ref. |
|---|---|---|---|---|
| 7 January | Alone in the Universe | Jeff Lynne's ELO | RCA | |
| 14 January | Alone in the Universe | Jeff Lynne's ELO | RCA | |
| 21 January | Alone in the Universe | Jeff Lynne's ELO | RCA | |
| 28 January | White Bear | The Temperance Movement | Earache | |
| 4 February | Dystopia | Megadeth | Universal | |
| 11 February | The Astonishing | Dream Theater | Roadrunner | |
| 18 February | Hidden City | The Cult | Cooking Vinyl | |
| 25 February | Nevermind | Nirvana | Geffen | |
| 3 March | Victorious | Wolfmother | Universal | |
| 10 March | For All Kings | Anthrax | Nuclear Blast | |
| 17 March | Limitless | Tonight Alive | Easy Life | |
| 24 March | Incarnate | Killswitch Engage | Roadrunner | |
| 31 March | Incarnate | Killswitch Engage | Roadrunner | |
| 7 April | The Black | Asking Alexandria | Sumerian | |
| 14 April | Kentucky | Black Stone Cherry | Mascot | |
| 21 April | Gore | Deftones | Reprise | |
| 28 April | Immortalized | Disturbed | Reprise | |
| 5 May | Immortalized | Disturbed | Reprise | |
| 12 May | Immortalized | Disturbed | Reprise | |
| 19 May | Immortalized | Disturbed | Reprise | |
| 26 May | Misadventures | Pierce the Veil | Fearless | |
| 2 June | Immortalized | Disturbed | Reprise | |
| 9 June | All Our Gods Have Abandoned Us | Architects | Epitaph | |
| 16 June | Seal the Deal & Let's Boogie | Volbeat | Spinefarm | |
| 23 June | Hollow Bones | Rival Sons | Earache | |
| 30 June | Magma | Gojira | Roadrunner | |
| 7 July | Drones | Muse | Helium 3/Warner Bros. | |
| 14 July | California | Blink-182 | BMG | |
| 21 July | Ellipsis | Biffy Clyro | 14th Floor | |
| 28 July | Ellipsis | Biffy Clyro | 14th Floor | |
| 4 August | Ellipsis | Biffy Clyro | 14th Floor | |
| 11 August | Afraid of Heights | Billy Talent | Atlantic | |
| 18 August | Blush | Moose Blood | Hopeless | |
| 25 August | This Could Be Heartbreak | The Amity Affliction | Roadrunner | |
| 1 September | The Last Stand | Sabaton | Nuclear Blast | |
| 8 September | Ellipsis | Biffy Clyro | 14th Floor | |
| 15 September | Bad Vibrations | A Day to Remember | ADTR | |
| 22 September | GLA | Twin Atlantic | Red Bull | |
| 29 September | The Complete BBC Sessions | Led Zeppelin | Rhino | |
| 6 October | F E A R | Marillion | earMusic | |
| 13 October | Sorceress | Opeth | Nuclear Blast | |
| 20 October | Revolution Radio | Green Day | Reprise | |
| 27 October | Like an Arrow | Blackberry Smoke | Earache | |
| 3 November | The Serenity of Suffering | Korn | Roadrunner | |
| 10 November | The Stage | Avenged Sevenfold | Capitol | |
| 17 November | The Stage | Avenged Sevenfold | Capitol | |
| 24 November | The Early Years 1965–1972 | Pink Floyd | Rhino | |
| 1 December | Hardwired... to Self-Destruct † | Metallica | Blackened/Vertigo | |
| 8 December | Hardwired... to Self-Destruct † | Metallica | Blackened/Vertigo | |
| 15 December | Hardwired... to Self-Destruct † | Metallica | Blackened/Vertigo | |
| 22 December | Hardwired... to Self-Destruct † | Metallica | Blackened/Vertigo | |
| 29 December | Hardwired... to Self-Destruct † | Metallica | Blackened/Vertigo | |

== See also ==
- 2016 in British music
- List of UK Rock & Metal Singles Chart number ones of 2016
