= Angels on My Side =

Single by Rick Astley

from the album 50
- Released: 13 May 2016
- Recorded: 2014–2015
- Genre: Pop
- Length: 3:35
- Label: BMG
- Songwriter: Rick Astley
- Producer: Rick Astley

Rick Astley singles chronology
"Keep Singing" (2016)	"Angels on My Side" (2016)	"Dance" (2016)

Music video
- "Angels on My Side" on YouTube

"Angels on My Side" is a song by English singer and songwriter Rick Astley. It was released as a digital download in the United Kingdom on 13 May 2016 as the second single from his seventh studio album 50 (2016). The song has charted in Belgium and Hungary. The song was written and produced by Astley and is performed in the key of G minor.

In 2019, Astley recorded and released a "reimagined" version of the song for his album The Best of Me, which features a new piano arrangement.

== Music video ==
A music video to accompany the release of "Angels on My Side" was first released onto YouTube on 9 June 2016 at a total length of three minutes and twenty-five seconds. The video features Astley with three captors, who are knocked out by a group of dancers who also serve as backing vocalists.

On 9 June 2023, the music video was remastered in 4K.

== Track listing ==
Digital download
No.	Title	Length
1.	"Angels on My Side"	3:35

== Charts ==
=== Weekly charts ===
Chart (2016)	Peak position
Belgium (Ultratip Wallonia Bubbling Under)	4
Hungary (Rádiós Top 40)	35

== Release history ==
Region	Date	Format	Label
United Kingdom	13 May 2016	Digital download	BMG
