= Keep Singing =

Single by Rick Astley

from the album 50
- Released: 6 April 2016
- Recorded: 2014–2015
- Genre: Pop
- Length: 3:58
- Label: BMG
- Songwriter(s): Rick Astley
- Producer(s): Rick Astley

Rick Astley singles chronology
"Superman" (2012)	"Keep Singing" (2016)	"Angels on My Side" (2016)

Music video
- "Keep Singing" on YouTube

"Keep Singing" is a song by English singer and songwriter Rick Astley. It was released as a digital download in the United Kingdom on 6 April 2016 as the lead single from his seventh studio album 50 (2016). The song peaked at number 40 on the UK Singles Chart and also charted in Belgium. The song was written and produced by Astley and is performed in the key of B flat minor.

In 2019, Astley recorded and released a "reimagined" version of the song for his album The Best of Me.

== Music video ==
A music video to accompany the release of "Keep Singing" was first released onto YouTube on 6 April 2016 at a total length of three minutes and thirty-eight seconds.

On 17 February 2023, the music video was remastered in 4K.

== Track listing ==
Digital download
No.	Title	Length
1.	"Keep Singing"	3:58

== Charts ==
=== Weekly charts ===
Chart (2016)	Peak position
Belgium (Ultratip Bubbling Under Flanders)	25
Belgium (Ultratip Bubbling Under Wallonia)	46
Scotland (OCC)	37
UK Singles (OCC)	40

== Release history ==
Region	Date	Format	Label
United Kingdom	6 April 2016	Digital download	BMG
