= The Neales (band) =

British band

The Neales are a British, four part family harmony group made up of three brothers and their father. The family band reached the final of Britain's Got Talent 2015 finishing in ninth place, moving Simon Cowell to tears on live television with their semi-final performance of Cat Stevens' "Father and Son".

In June 2016, The Neales released their self-penned debut single, "I'll Be There", which entered the UK Singles Chart at No. 22 in its first week, and knocked Adele off No. 1 in the Official UK Independent Singles Chart. During the following week, "I'll Be There" peaked at No. 6 in the UK Singles Chart's midweek update, before charting for a second week at No. 31.

The Neales are made up of father Laurie Neale, and brothers James Neale, Dan Neale and Phil Neale.

Phil Neale later went on to found the sleep app Snoozle, and pitched it on Dragons' Den.
