= Gwyneth George =

British cellist and teacher

Gwyneth George (27 May 1920 – 16 February 2016) was a British cellist and teacher.

== Life ==
Gwyneth George was born on the Mumbles, Wales, on 27 May 1920, and educated in Swansea. She studied at the Guildhall School of Music and Drama, and won a scholarship to the Royal College of Music, where she was a student of Ivor James. She later studied with Enrico Mainardi in Rome and with Paul Tortelier in Paris.

In 1950 she made her debut at the Wigmore Hall, and during the 1950s gave concerts around the UK.

In the early 1960 she was a professor of music in Kingston, Jamaica. Returning to Britain, she taught at the Trinity College of Music, London, and regularly performed with the Argentine pianist Alberto Portugheis from 1967 to 1972, in the UK and elsewhere in Europe.

Gwyneth George made one commercial recording, in 1971 of cello sonatas by Rachmaninoff and Shostakovich, accompanied by Portugheis. The Shostakovich was described by the critic of The Gramophone as "the most searching account of the work I have met on LP".

In 1979 she gave the first performance of Five Nocturnes and Cadenzas, written for her by Alun Hoddinott.

She gave her name in 1998 to the Gwyneth George Award, presented annually by the Beethoven Piano Society of Europe to a chamber music group.
