= Emily Hall =

British composer (1978-)

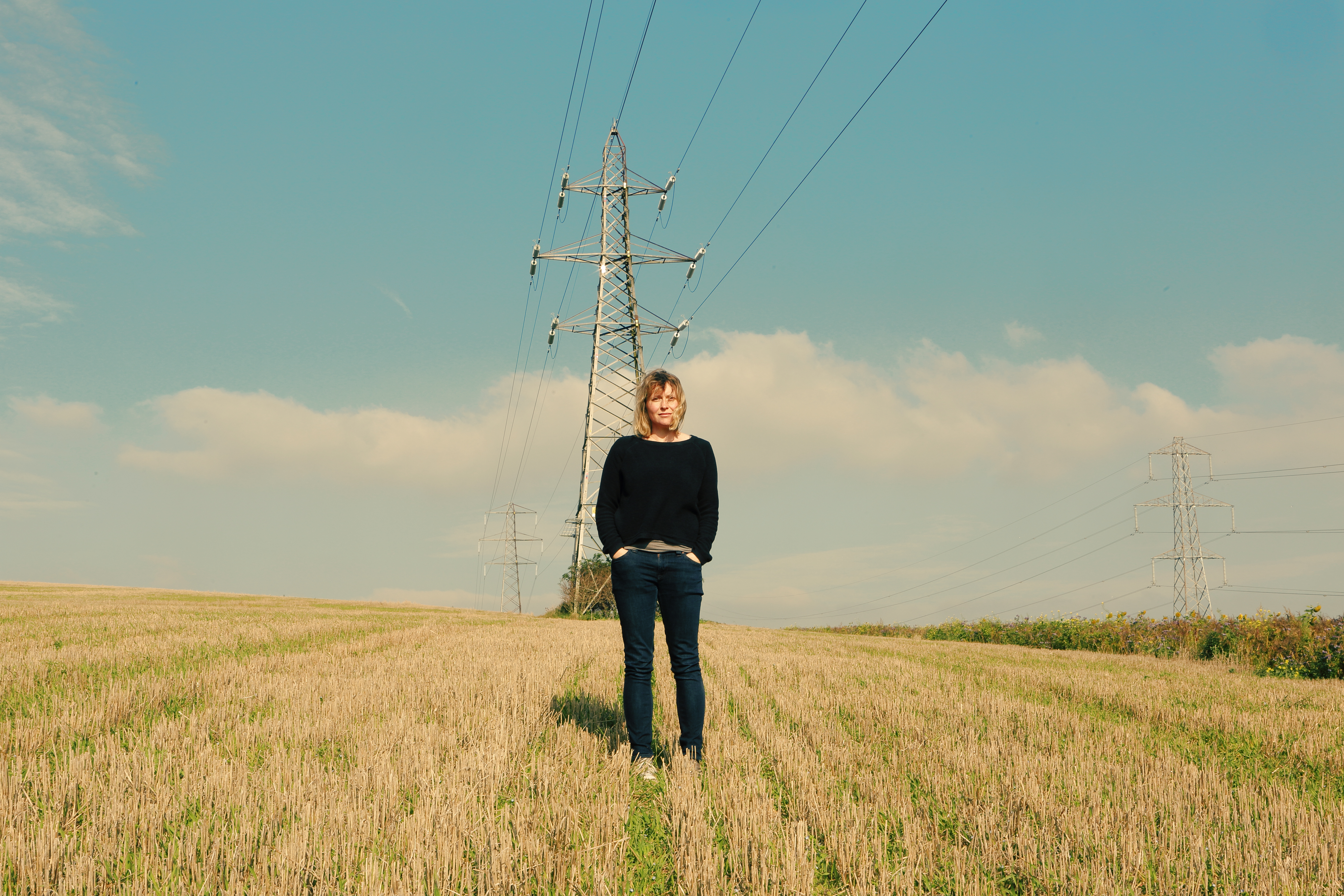
- Hall in 2016
- Born: 30 March 1978 (age 47)
- Era: Contemporary
- Website: Emily Hall

Emily Hall (born 30 March 1978) is a composer of classical music, electronica and songs. Her music has been performed by the Duke Quartet, the London Symphony Orchestra, the Brodsky Quartet, the London Sinfonietta, and the Philharmonia; it has been broadcast on BBC Radio 3, BBC Radio 4 and France Culture. Roxanna Panufnik said of her in 2009 (and 21st century female classical composers in general): "Hip young things like Tansy Davies and Emily Hall will exert a great influence on the new music scene in the next ten years."

== Biography ==
Hall read music at the University of York then studied orchestration with Yan Maresz in Paris. She studied with Julian Anderson for her master's degree in composition at the Royal College of Music. She is a founding member of c3, the Camberwell Composers Collective. Hall is a member of Bedroom Community, an Icelandic record label/collective. Her music is formed from close relationships with singers and writers and she seeks her own ways of using technology and live performance. Hall has received the Paul Hamlyn Foundation Award for Artists (2013), the Genesis Opera Prize (2006) and the Royal Philharmonic Society Composition Award (2005).

The world premiere of her opera Sante took place on 24 May 2006, co-produced by Aldeburgh Productions and the London Sinfonietta, directed by Tim Supple. It utilised African melody and rhythm.

Her one-act opera Found and Lost premiered in January 2016 at the Corinthia Hotel in London.

Folie à Deux (2015) is a collaboration with Icelandic writer and long-time Björk collaborator Sjón. It is conceived both as a concept album and an opera and utilises a newly created instrument called the electro-magnetic harp which uses vibrating magnets.

== Awards ==
- Paul Hamlyn Foundation Award for Artists ― 2013
- Royal Philharmonic Society Composition Award ― 2005
