= List of UK R&B Singles Chart number ones of 2016 =

The logo of the Official Charts Company, responsible for compiling all of the official music charts in the United Kingdom, including the R&B singles chart.

The UK R&B Singles Chart is a weekly chart that ranks the 40 biggest-selling singles and albums that are classified in the R&B genre in the United Kingdom. The chart is compiled by the Official Charts Company, and is based on both physical, Streaming and digital sales.

The following are the songs which have topped the UK R&B Singles Chart in 2016.

== Number-one singles ==
Key
†	Best-selling R&B single of the year

Chart date (week ending)	Song	Artist(s)	Record label	References
7 January	"In2"	WSTRN	Atlantic	
14 January	"In2"	WSTRN	Atlantic	
21 January	"In2"	WSTRN	Atlantic	
28 January	"Shut Up"	Stormzy	Stormzy	
4 February	"Work"	Rihanna featuring Drake	Westbury Road / Roc Nation	
11 February^{[a]}	"Pillowtalk"	Zayn Malik	RCA	
18 February	"Pillowtalk"	Zayn Malik	RCA	
25 February	"Pillowtalk"	Zayn Malik	RCA	
3 March	"Work"	Rihanna featuring Drake	Westbury Road / Roc Nation	
10 March	"Work"	Rihanna featuring Drake	Westbury Road / Roc Nation	
17 March	"Work"	Rihanna featuring Drake	Westbury Road / Roc Nation	
24 March	"Work from Home"	Fifth Harmony featuring Ty Dolla $ign	Epic / Syco	
31 March	"Work from Home"	Fifth Harmony featuring Ty Dolla $ign	Epic / Syco	
7 April	"Work from Home"	Fifth Harmony featuring Ty Dolla $ign	Epic / Syco	
14 April	"Work from Home"	Fifth Harmony featuring Ty Dolla $ign	Epic / Syco	
21 April^{[a]}	"One Dance" †	Drake featuring Wizkid & Kyla	Republic / Young Money	
28 April^{[a]}	"One Dance" †	Drake featuring Wizkid & Kyla	Republic / Young Money	
5 May^{[a]}	"One Dance" †	Drake featuring Wizkid & Kyla	Republic / Young Money	
12 May^{[a]} ^{[b]}	"One Dance" †	Drake featuring Wizkid & Kyla	Republic / Young Money	
19 May^{[a]}	"One Dance" †	Drake featuring Wizkid & Kyla	Republic / Young Money	
26 May^{[a]}	"One Dance" †	Drake featuring Wizkid & Kyla	Republic / Young Money	
2 June^{[a]}	"One Dance" †	Drake featuring Wizkid & Kyla	Republic / Young Money	
9 June^{[a]}	"One Dance" †	Drake featuring Wizkid & Kyla	Republic / Young Money	
16 June^{[a]}	"One Dance" †	Drake featuring Wizkid & Kyla	Republic / Young Money	
23 June^{[a]}	"One Dance" †	Drake featuring Wizkid & Kyla	Republic / Young Money	
30 June^{[a]}	"One Dance" †	Drake featuring Wizkid & Kyla	Republic / Young Money	
7 July^{[a]}	"One Dance" †	Drake featuring Wizkid & Kyla	Republic / Young Money	
14 July^{[a]}	"One Dance" †	Drake featuring Wizkid & Kyla	Republic / Young Money	
21 July^{[a]}	"One Dance" †	Drake featuring Wizkid & Kyla	Republic / Young Money	
28 July^{[a]}	"One Dance" †	Drake featuring Wizkid & Kyla	Republic / Young Money	
4 August	"One Dance" †	Drake featuring Wizkid & Kyla	Republic / Young Money	
11 August	"One Dance" †	Drake featuring Wizkid & Kyla	Republic / Young Money	
18 August	"One Dance" †	Drake featuring Wizkid & Kyla	Republic / Young Money	
25 August	"One Dance" †	Drake featuring Wizkid & Kyla	Republic / Young Money	
1 September	"One Dance" †	Drake featuring Wizkid & Kyla	Republic / Young Money	
8 September	"One Dance" †	Drake featuring Wizkid & Kyla	Republic / Young Money	
15 September	"One Dance" †	Drake featuring Wizkid & Kyla	Republic / Young Money	
22 September	"One Dance" †	Drake featuring Wizkid & Kyla	Republic / Young Money	
29 September	"One Dance" †	Drake featuring Wizkid & Kyla	Republic / Young Money	
6 October	"Sucker for Pain"	Lil Wayne, Wiz Khalifa, Imagine Dragons, Logic, Ty Dolla Sign & X Ambassadors	Atlantic / Warner Bros.	
13 October	"Sucker for Pain"	Lil Wayne, Wiz Khalifa, Imagine Dragons, Logic, Ty Dolla Sign & X Ambassadors	Atlantic / Warner Bros.	
20 October	"One Dance" †	Drake featuring Wizkid & Kyla	Republic / Young Money	
27 October	"One Dance" †	Drake featuring Wizkid & Kyla	Republic / Young Money	
3 November ^{[b]}	"One Dance" †	Drake featuring Wizkid & Kyla	Republic / Young Money	
10 November	"Fake Love"	Drake	Republic / Young Money	
17 November	"Fake Love"	Drake	Republic / Young Money	
24 November	"Black Beatles"	Rae Sremmurd featuring Gucci Mane	EarDrummers/Interscope	
1 December	"Black Beatles"	Rae Sremmurd featuring Gucci Mane	EarDrummers/Interscope	
8 December	"Black Beatles"	Rae Sremmurd featuring Gucci Mane	EarDrummers/Interscope	
15 December	"Black Beatles"	Rae Sremmurd featuring Gucci Mane	EarDrummers/Interscope	
22 December	"Black Beatles"	Rae Sremmurd featuring Gucci Mane	EarDrummers/Interscope	
29 December	"Black Beatles"	Rae Sremmurd featuring Gucci Mane	EarDrummers/Interscope	

== Notes ==
- ^{a} - The single was simultaneously number-one on the UK Singles Chart.
- ^{b} - The artist was simultaneously number-one on the R&B Albums Chart.

== See also ==
- List of UK Singles Chart number ones of 2016
- List of UK R&B Albums Chart number ones of 2016
- List of UK Dance Singles Chart number ones of 2016
