= Corinthia Hotel London =

Luxury hotel in London, England

Coordinates: 51.5066°N 0.1243°W

Corinthia London
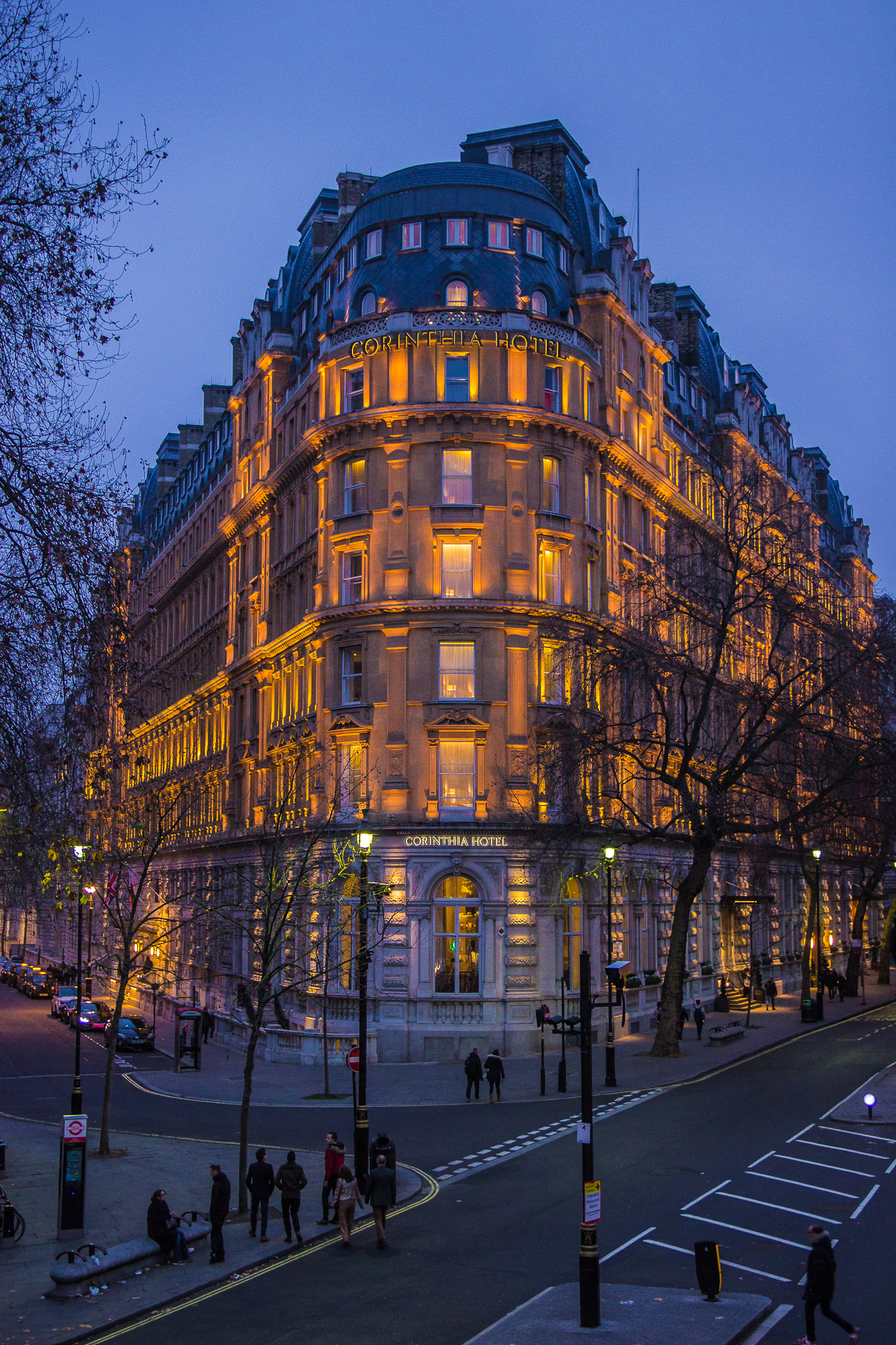
- Interactive map of the Corinthia London area
- Hotel chain: Corinthia Hotels

General information
- Location: London, England, Whitehall Place
- Opening: 1885, restored 2011
- Management: Corinthia Hotels

Other information
- Number of rooms: 283
- Number of suites: 58
- Number of restaurants: 2

Website
- www.corinthia.com/hotels/london

The Corinthia London Hotel, at the corner of Northumberland Avenue and Whitehall Place in central London, is a hotel and former British Government building, located on a triangular site between Trafalgar Square and the Thames Embankment.

Originally opened in 1885 as the Metropole Hotel, its location close to the Palace of Westminster and government offices in Whitehall meant it was commandeered in both world wars. After the Second World War, it was purchased by the Ministry of Defence and used as government offices until it was declared surplus to requirements and sold by Crown Estates in 2007. It was then restored as a hotel and renamed the Corinthia Hotel, a combination of hotel and residential building.

== History ==
=== Metropole Hotel ===
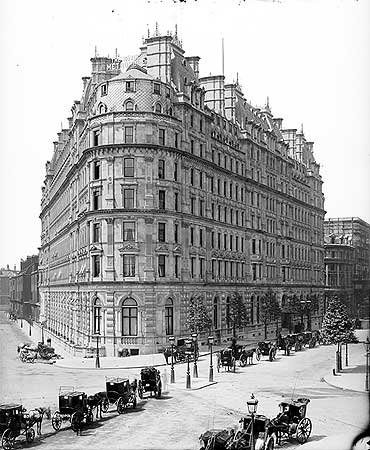
Metropole Hotel, soon after opening

Commissioned by the Gordon Hotels company, construction was started in 1883. The hotel opened in 1885, with an 88-page brochure which claimed:

That the hotel’s location is particularly recommend it to ladies and families visiting the West End during the Season; to travellers from Paris and the Continent, arriving from Dover and Folkestone at the Charing Cross Terminus; to Officers and others attending the levees at St James; to Ladies going to the Drawing Rooms, State Balls, and Concerts at Buckingham Palace; and to colonial and American visitors unused to the great world of London

The hotel was the venue for the annual dinners of the Aero Club and the Alpine Club for several years, and acted as the gathering point for competitors in the first London to Brighton run in 1896. The Prince of Wales, later King Edward VII entertained guests at the hotel on various occasions, having a reserved box in the ballroom and using the Royal Suite, thought to have been the first floor rooms with bowfronted windows fronting Whitehall Place.

=== World War I ===
The hotel was requisitioned in the run-up to World War I to provide accommodation for government staff, together with the other hotels and buildings in Northumberland Avenue, including the Constitutional Club and the offices of the Society for the Promotion of Christian Knowledge. The night before the British Expeditionary Force embarked for France on the outbreak of the war in August 1914, its two Commanders-in-Chief in the conflict, Field Marshals John French and Douglas Haig, both stayed in the building.

=== Inter-war years ===
Reopening as a hotel after World War I, the "Midnight Follies" became a well-known cabaret fixture.

In 1921 Bert Firman got a job as a violinist with the Midnight Follies Orchestra at the hotel. Shortly after beginning the job, the current band leader an alcoholic American saxophone player was indisposed, and Firman was offered the job. Only sixteen, he would thereafter claim to have been the youngest bandleader in the world. After Firman left residence in 1924, other band leaders that played the hotel in the inter-war years included Mantovani.

On 4 January 1936 the England Rugby Union team, thanks to three try tries by Russian Prince Alexander Obolensky, beat the touring New Zealand All Blacks 13–0, the first time England had beaten New Zealand. Aided by Pathé News footage of the game, Obolensky's name entered into legend, since the first try, beating several All Blacks in a run of three-quarters of the length of the field, was widely regarded as the greatest try of the time, and one of the greatest tries ever scored by England. The England team retired that night to the Metropole, where they found that the opposing New Zealand team also happened to be staying.

When the government redeveloped buildings at Whitehall Gardens in mid-1936, they leased the entire hotel for £300,000pa, to provide alternative office accommodation, initially for the Ministry of Labour and the Ministry of Transport, later for the Air Ministry and the Ministry of Defence.

=== World War II ===
About to hand back the building, the government extended the lease by again requisitioning the building in the build-up to World War II. Again a home for various departments, room 424 became the first home for MI9 and the Special Operations Executive, and later the holding point for one of the model planning beaches for Operation Overlord.

=== Metropole building ===
Purchased from Gordon Hotels after World War II, it was transferred to the Crown Estate portfolio. Controlled by the Ministry of Defence, who used it as an overflow building to its main Whitehall complex, by 1951 the Air Ministry was again a major occupant. From the mid-60s until 1992 it housed the bulk of the Defence Intelligence Staff, the remainder of the analysts and the DIS central staff being sited in the MoD Main Building. In the James Bond comic strip in the Daily Express the artist Yaroslav Horak quite often depicted the Metropole Building as MI6 HQ. Subsequently, the MoD used the building during various refurbishments, when the mirrored ballroom provided the setting for Press Conferences and other major events.

=== Corinthia Hotel ===
Having stood unoccupied since 2004, in 2007 the Metropole Building and the adjoining 10 Whitehall Place were acquired for a sum of £130 million by a consortium owned equally by Malta's IHI plc and two of its principal shareholders, the Libyan Foreign Investment Company and Nakheel Hotels of Dubai. In September 2008 City of Westminster council approved development of the two buildings as a hotel and residential complex.

The building reopened in 2011 managed by Corinthia Hotels International. 10 Whitehall Place has been converted to 12 residences, and a spa run by Espa.

In a nod to its past, the official announcement of the James Bond movie Skyfall was made at a press conference held at the Corinthia Hotel in November 2011.

A lengthy sequence in the 2018 thriller Red Sparrow was filmed both inside and outside the hotel. The film's press junket and photocall were also later held at the hotel, with star Jennifer Lawrence dressed in a Versace gown that attracted media attention.

== Artist in residence ==
Begun in 2011, Artist in Residence is a performance usually lasting one hour that takes place on several dates. Since it began the hotel has invited individual writers, theatre companies and filmmakers to respond by application. The performer is normally an artist winning a national competition. The opera Found and Lost, by artist-in-residence Emily Hall, was performed in the hotel in January and February 2016.
