= I'll Be There (The Neales song) =

Single by The Neales
- Released: 10 June 2016
- Length: 3:42
- Songwriters: Laurie Neale; James Neale; Dan Neale; Phil Neale

"I'll Be There" is a song by Britain's Got Talent series 9 finalists The Neales. It was released as their debut single on 10 June 2016, with all profits going to charity. The single peaked at number 22 on the UK Singles Chart.

== Background and production ==
The Neales - made up of father Laurie Neale and his three sons James, Dan and Phil - reached the Britain's Got Talent final in 2015, where they sang a cover of the Cat Stevens song "Father and Son". After competing in the talent show, they penned the charity single "I'll Be There" to raise money for the National Charity Partnership. The single was released ahead of Father's Day in 2016, and was made available to buy in around 750 Tesco stores across the UK, in a personalised sleeve. The group went on a tour of Tesco stores to promote the single.

Group member Phil had worked for Tesco since 2014, and his father Laurie had suffered a heart attack 10 years before their appearance on Britain's Got Talent. Their experiences gave them the inspiration to write the song and raise money to help people who were recovering from heart conditions.

== Chart performance ==
"I'll Be There" entered the UK charts on the week ending 22 June 2016 at its peak of number 22. It spent a second week in the top 40, falling to number 31 the following week.

== Charts ==
Chart (2016)	Peak position
UK Singles (OCC)	22
UK Indie (OCC)	1
