= Re-Arrange =

Single by Biffy Clyro

from the album Ellipsis
- Released: 24 November 2016
- Genre: Pop rock
- Length: 3:37
- Label: 14th Floor
- Songwriter(s): Simon Neil
- Producer(s): Rich Costey

Biffy Clyro singles chronology
"Howl" (2016)	"Re-Arrange" (2016)	"Flammable" (2017)

"Re-Arrange" is a song by Scottish alternative rock band Biffy Clyro, and the fourth single from the band's seventh studio album, Ellipsis.

== Charts ==
Chart (2016–2017)	Peak position
Italy (FIMI)	79
Czech Republic (Rádio – Top 100)	28
Scotland (OCC)	39
UK Rock & Metal (OCC)	1

== Certifications ==
Region	Certification	Certified units/sales
United Kingdom (BPI)	Silver	200,000^{‡}
^{‡} Sales+streaming figures based on certification alone.
