= Found and Lost (opera) =

Opera by Emily Hall

Found and Lost is a one-act opera by Emily Hall, first performed in January 2016, which "straddles the worlds of opera, art installation and promenade theatrical event".

== Background ==
The opera, which lasts about 50 minutes, is to a libretto by Matthew Welton. It is described as "an opera installation....written using found texts within Corinthia Hotel London" – these texts include for example checklists for room service staff. The opera was created by the composer whilst she was an artist-in-residence at the Corinthia Hotel in London. The composer's brief was to write an opera to take place in the hotel with a budget limit of £15,000. Hall carried out initial research in different areas of the hotel with the sound designer David Sheppard, with whom she had previously collaborated. The composer has said "Found and Lost is really not conventionally an opera. I prefer 'opera installation'. But unlike theatre, it is music-led: things have been dictated by the length of bits of music, rather than the music being fitted to the drama."

== Opera ==
Performances took take place in the hotel between 25 January and 3 February 2016. Audiences, who were limited in number to twelve per performance, were required to carry portable speakers and to follow the performers through various parts of the hotel, including its bedrooms, bars and boiler room. The plot commences with a list of lost objects, which include a bouquet, a swimsuit and a photograph, based on items which had actually been reported lost in the hotel. The composer says that the opera adumbrates "a date that goes badly wrong … the audience can piece together what has happened." Events include arguments, videos, drunkenness and "an enigmatic but probably bad denouement in a bedroom".

The opera's forces include an a cappella chorus, two actors, electric organ and a cellist.

== Reception ==
Critical comments have included "I particularly enjoyed a trip to the boiler room with its chaotic array of pipes and conduits, an alien world where music mixed with hissing technology"; " a triumph of marketing, even if the material itself feels slight"; and "Part of the fascination is that you are never sure who are the real guests and staff, and who is acting a part."
