= Wolves of Winter =

Single by Biffy Clyro

from the album Ellipsis
- Released: 21 March 2016
- Genre: Alternative rock; hard rock
- Length: 4:08
- Label: 14th Floor
- Songwriter: Simon Neil
- Producer: Rich Costey

Biffy Clyro singles chronology
"Victory Over the Sun" (2013)	"Wolves of Winter" (2016)	"Animal Style" (2016)

"Wolves of Winter" is a song by Scottish alternative rock band Biffy Clyro, and the first single from the band's seventh studio album, Ellipsis. It was released on 21 March 2016 and premiered as Zane Lowe's World Record on Beats 1. It was later sent to alternative radio in the United States on 15 August 2017 as the album's sixth domestic single.

== Release and promotion ==
The release came after a series of teaser videos previewing small clips of the song was uploaded to the band's official YouTube channel. These videos were eventually removed on the day of release, and replaced with a lengthier preview of the song which announced the name and release date of the album.

== Background and concept ==
Lead singer Simon Neil appeared on both initial broadcasts to talk about the upcoming album and its first single. He explained how the idea for the song came from a documentary by David Attenborough which talked about the territorial habits of wolves in the wild, comparing it to his feelings towards those who had doubted his ability to succeed.

'Wolves of Winter' was the first song recorded for Ellipsis, and the first song recorded with producer Rich Costey. During an interview with NME, Neil also admitted that he is excited to perform the track live, stating that it would likely serve as a show-opener for the next few years. He explained the difficulties the band faced during recording, due to Costey challenging the band to help the evolution of their music. Drummer Ben Johnston elaborated on Costey's production, experimenting with recording techniques such as recording every drum piece individually and taping a microphone to Johnston's chest. Eventually they settled on sending the microphones through a Marshall amp in order to give the drums a distorted sound.

== Video ==
A music video for the song was released on 12 April 2016. The concept of the video, as described by Simon Neil, "is basically the full evolution of man". The video is the first not to include the band members themselves, which Neil has said to be "a relief". It features a Star Wars inspired ending, with a ship blowing up a space station.

== Charts ==
Chart (2016)	Peak position
Scottish Singles (Official Charts Company)	32
UK Singles (Official Charts Company)	110
UK Rock & Metal (Official Charts Company)	1
US Mainstream Rock (Billboard)	28
