= 50 (Rick Astley album) =

Studio album by Rick Astley
- Released: 10 June 2016
- Genres: Pop; soul
- Length: 40:31
- Label: BMG
- Producer: Rick Astley

Rick Astley chronology
Greatest Hits (2014)	50 (2016)	Beautiful Life (2018)

Singles from 50
- 1. "Keep Singing" Released: 6 April 2016; 2. "Angels on My Side" Released: 13 May 2016; 3. "God Says / Dance" Released: 7 September 2016

Professional ratings
Review scores
Source	Rating
AllMusic	3/5 stars

50 is the seventh studio album by English singer and songwriter Rick Astley. It was released on 10 June 2016 by BMG. It is Astley's first studio album in more than 10 years, following Portrait (2005). In the United Kingdom, 50 became Astley's first number-one album since his 1987 debut album Whenever You Need Somebody. All songs on this album were sung, written and recorded by Astley himself. The album was later released on 7 October 2016 in the United States, marking his first American release since 1993's Body & Soul. The album was made as a commencement to Astley's 50th birthday in 2016, hence the album's title.

== Singles ==
"Keep Singing" was released as the lead single from the album on 6 April 2016. "Angels on My Side" was released as the second single from the album on 13 May 2016. Astley announced a new limited single called "Dance" (which includes the song "God Says") on 19 July 2016.

== Commercial performance ==
50 debuted at number one on the UK Albums Chart, selling 23,691 units in its opening week. It was Astley's first number-one album in the United Kingdom since Whenever You Need Somebody (1987). In Germany, the album debuted at number 42 on the German Albums Chart, becoming his highest-charting album since Free (1991) which charted at number eight. On 8 July 2016, the album was certified Silver for sales of 60,000 copies from BPI. On 30 June 2017, Astley announced on his Twitter account that 50 had been certified Platinum in the United Kingdom (300,000 and more albums sold).

== Track listing ==
All tracks are written by Rick Astley.

No.	Title	Length
1.	"Keep Singing"	3:58
2.	"Angels on My Side"	3:35
3.	"Wish Away"	3:27
4.	"This Old House"	4:30
5.	"Pieces"	3:58
6.	"God Says / Dance"	3:15
7.	"I Like the Sun"	3:40
8.	"Somebody Loves Me"	3:22
9.	"Let It Rain"	3:52
10.	"Pray with Me"	3:39
11.	"Coming Home Tonight"	3:28
12.	"Let It Be Tonight"	3:48
Total length:		44:36

US release bonus tracks
No.	Title	Length
13.	"A Letter"	3:52
14.	"Sailing"	2:50
Total length:		51:11

== Personnel ==
- Rick Astley – lead and backing vocals, all instruments
- Dawn Joseph – backing vocals (1, 2, 4–7, 9, 10, 11)
- Annabel Williams – backing vocals (1, 10)
- Emilie Bausager Astley, Lene Bausager Astley, Georgia Frampton, Jacqui Hughes and Kevin Hughes – choir (9)

=== Production ===
- Rick Astley – producer
- Dan Frampton – vocal producer, engineer, mixing
- Tom Coyne – mastering
- We Art You – art direction, design
- Peter Neill – photography
- Pip – photography
- Recorded and mixed at the Grey Room (Hollywood, California).
- Mastered at Sterling Sound (New York City, New York).

== Charts ==
=== Weekly charts ===
Chart (2016)	Peak position
Austrian Albums (Ö3 Austria)	41
Belgian Albums (Ultratop Flanders)	35
Belgian Albums (Ultratop Wallonia)	76
Dutch Albums (Album Top 100)	65
German Albums (Offizielle Top 100)	21
Scottish Albums (Official Charts)	1
Spanish Albums (Promusicae)	70
Swiss Albums (Schweizer Hitparade)	44
UK Albums (Official Charts)	1

=== Year-end charts ===
Chart (2016)	Position
UK Albums (OCC)	18

== Certifications ==
Certifications for 50
Region	Certification	Certified units/sales
United Kingdom (BPI)	Platinum	324,686
