= List of UK R&B Albums Chart number ones of 2016 =

The logo of the Official Charts Company, responsible for compiling all of the official music charts in the United Kingdom, including the R&B albums chart.

The UK R&B Albums Chart is a weekly chart, first introduced in October 1994, that ranks the 40 biggest-selling albums that are classified in the R&B and Hip hop genres in the United Kingdom. The chart is compiled by the Official Charts Company, and is based on sales of CDs, downloads, vinyl and other formats over the previous seven days.

The following are the number-one albums of 2016.

== Number-one albums ==
Issue date	Album	Artist(s)	Record label	Ref.
1 January	Beauty Behind the Madness	The Weeknd	Republic	
8 January	Beauty Behind the Madness	The Weeknd	Republic	
15 January	Keep Up	KSI	Island	
22 January	Beauty Behind the Madness	The Weeknd	Republic	
29 January	Beauty Behind the Madness	The Weeknd	Republic	
5 February	Anti	Rihanna	Westbury Road / Roc Nation	
12 February	Throwback Slowjams	Various Artists	Ministry of Sound	
19 February	Throwback Slowjams	Various Artists	Ministry of Sound	
26 February	Throwback Slowjams	Various Artists	Ministry of Sound	
4 March	This Unruly Mess I've Made	Macklemore & Ryan Lewis	Macklemore LLC	
11 March	Made in the Manor	Kano	Parlophone	
18 March	Old Skool	Various Artists	Ministry of Sound	
25 March	Back to Black	Amy Winehouse	Island	
1 April ^{[a]}	Mind of Mine	Zayn	RCA	
8 April	Mind of Mine	Zayn	RCA	
15 April	Mind of Mine	Zayn	RCA	
22 April	Anti	Rihanna	Westbury Road / Roc Nation	
29 April ^{[a]}	Lemonade	Beyoncé	Parkwood / Columbia	
6 May ^{[a]} ^{[b]}	Views	Drake	Young Money / Republic	
13 May	Lemonade	Beyoncé	Parkwood / Columbia	
20 May	Lemonade	Beyoncé	Parkwood / Columbia	
27 May	Lemonade	Beyoncé	Parkwood / Columbia	
3 June	Lemonade	Beyoncé	Parkwood / Columbia	
10 June	Lemonade	Beyoncé	Parkwood / Columbia	
17 June	Throwback Summer Jamz	Various Artists	Ministry of Sound	
24 June	Throwback Summer Jamz	Various Artists	Ministry of Sound	
1 July	Throwback Summer Jamz	Various Artists	Ministry of Sound	
8 July	Lemonade	Beyoncé	Parkwood / Columbia	
15 July	Throwback Summer Jamz	Various Artists	Ministry of Sound	
22 July ^{[a]}	Love & Hate	Michael Kiwanuka	Polydor	
29 July	Love & Hate	Michael Kiwanuka	Polydor	
5 August	Major Key	DJ Khaled	We the Best/Epic	
12 August	Landlord	Giggs	SNI	
19 August	PartyNextDoor 3	PartyNextDoor	OVO/Parlophone	
26 August ^{[a]}	Blonde	Frank Ocean	Boys Don't Cry	
2 September	Blonde	Frank Ocean	Boys Don't Cry	
9 September	Growing Over Life	Wretch 32	Polydor	
16 September	Blonde	Frank Ocean	Boys Don't Cry	
23 September	Hard II Love	Usher	RCA	
30 September	Lemonade	Beyoncé	Parkwood / Columbia	
7 October	Chilled Hip Hop	Various Artists	Ministry of Sound	
14 October	Let Them Eat Chaos	Kae Tempest	Fiction	
21 October	1992	The Game	SPV	
28 October ^{[b]}	Views	Drake	Young Money / Republic	
4 November	Dreamland	Mic Righteous	Grimey Limey	
11 November	Here	Alicia Keys	RCA	
18 November	We Got It from Here... Thank You 4 Your Service	A Tribe Called Quest	Epic	
25 November	Views	Drake	Young Money / Republic	
2 December	Starboy	The Weeknd	Republic	
9 December	Starboy	The Weeknd	Republic	
16 December	Starboy	The Weeknd	Republic	
23 December	Starboy	The Weeknd	Republic	
30 December	Starboy	The Weeknd	Republic	

== Notes ==
- ^{a} - The album was simultaneously number-one on the UK Albums Chart.
- ^{b} - The artist was simultaneously number-one on the R&B Singles Chart.

== See also ==
- List of UK Albums Chart number ones of the 2010s
- List of UK R&B Singles Chart number ones of 2016
