= Ellipsis (Biffy Clyro album) =

Studio album by Biffy Clyro
- Released: 8 July 2016
- Recorded: 2015–2016
- Studio: Eldorado Recording Studios, Burbank, California and Foxy Studios Woodland Hills, Los Angeles, California
- Genre: Alternative rock, pop rock
- Length: 38:57
- Label: 14th Floor, Warner Bros.
- Producer: Biffy Clyro, Rich Costey

Biffy Clyro chronology
Similarities (2014)	Ellipsis (2016)	MTV Unplugged: Live at Roundhouse, London (2018)

Singles from Ellipsis
- 1. "Wolves of Winter" Released: 21 March 2016; 2. "Animal Style" Released: 25 May 2016; 3. "Howl" Released: 4 August 2016; 4. "Re-Arrange" Released: 24 November 2016; 5. "Flammable" Released: 18 January 2017; 6. "Friends and Enemies" Released: 3 May 2017

Ellipsis is the seventh studio album by Scottish alternative rock band Biffy Clyro. It was produced by Rich Costey and released on 8 July 2016. Ellipsis entered the UK charts at number one, making it Biffy Clyro's second number one album, after 2013's Opposites.

== Background ==
Confirmation that the band was working on a new record came in early 2014, with frontman Simon Neil telling Radio X in an interview that they had written "about 14 songs so far", stating that the album was projected for possible release by the end of 2015. He also commented saying that the band was due to take a break from public involvement to bring themselves away from the spotlight following touring in support of their 2013 album, Opposites.

The band took 2015 as a "year off" from public appearances, as they did not want fans to tire of seeing them, although they did play a one-off show as the headline act in Edinburgh's Hogmanay Concert in the Gardens, where they debuted a new song "On a Bang". The band recorded the majority of the album in Burbank, California following drummer Ben Johnston's claims that they would visit somewhere "exotic" to record it as a change of pace from their home country of Scotland. The band took a similar approach in 2012 while working on the previous record, travelling to West Los Angeles, California to record the majority of the album.

In January 2016, the band discussed the album with NME, calling it the "best record we've made", and revealing John Waters and hip-hop artist A$AP Rocky as influences of the sound of the new music.

In the days leading up to 21 March 2016, the band's official YouTube channel released snippets from the album's first single, "Wolves of Winter", announcing the date of the single's release. On 21 March, the videos were removed, and replaced by a 1:30 long preview of the song announcing the name and release date of the album. The song was first played in full on 21 March during Zane Lowe's Hottest Record on Beats 1, and again later during Annie Mac's World's Hottest Record on Radio 1. Lead singer Simon Neil appeared on both broadcasts to speak about the album and reveal some extra details about the background of the single.

== Artwork and releases ==
A limited edition Ellipsis box set has been made available to pre-order exclusively on the band's official store site. The full set includes two 180g heavyweight vinyl records, a 7" single ("Wolves of Winter"), a hard-cover book featuring photos and lyrics, hand-written lyrics from Simon Neil, and several prints signed by band members. It also includes a full digital copy of the album on release, and a downloadable MP3 of the album's first single.

The album's finalised artwork was released on 8 April 2016 via the band's official website and Instagram pages.

The standard album features 11 tracks, with a 13-track "Deluxe" edition released alongside the original. The deluxe edition of the album also contains an additional video when purchased on iTunes.

== Critical reception ==
The album received mixed-to-positive reviews from critics. At Metacritic, which assigns a normalized rating out of 100 to reviews from mainstream music critics, the album received an average score of 73, which indicates "generally favourable reviews". The Observer would award the album four out of five stars, praising the diversity of the tracklist from the "chugging, brutal 'Animal Style'" to the "R&B style of 'Re-Arrange'" and noted the track 'Herex' boasted a "malevolent reggae groove". Similarly, NME noted the contrast between the "pure urgency and anger" of the opening two tracks 'Wolves of Winter' and 'Friends and Enemies' and the "mellower, personal moments" such as 'Medicine' and 'People' and concluded that "by opening themselves up Biffy Clyro have captured the spirit of a brand-new band again."

Some reviews were more critical. The Guardian stated that the album is "simply less interesting than [the band] used to be", although did praise the track 'Small Wishes' due to its "likable country jangle". Conversely, this track was criticised by Consequence for being out of place, saying that it "should ultimately have been saved for a B-side compilation."

Professional ratings
Aggregate scores
Source	Rating
Metacritic	73/100
Review scores
Source	Rating
Kerrang!	4/5 stars
The Observer	4/5 stars
NME	4/5 stars
AllMusic	3.5/5 stars
The Guardian	2/5 stars

== Accolades ==
Publication	Accolade	Year	Rank	Ref.
NME	NME's Albums of the Year 2016	2016	26	

== Track listing ==
Songs and lyrics by Simon Neil, music by Simon Neil except where noted.

No.	Title	Writer(s)	Length
1.	"Wolves of Winter"		4:08
2.	"Friends and Enemies"		4:12
3.	"Animal Style"	Simon Neil; John Feldmann	3:30
4.	"Re-Arrange"		3:37
5.	"Herex"		3:57
6.	"Medicine"		3:53
7.	"Flammable"	Simon Neil; busbee	3:07
8.	"On a Bang"		2:38
9.	"Small Wishes"		3:06
10.	"Howl"	Simon Neil; Gary Lightbody; Johnny McDaid	3:33
11.	"People"		3:16
Total length:			38:57

Deluxe edition bonus tracks
No.	Title	Length
12.	"Don't, Won't, Can't"	3:18
13.	"In the Name of the Wee Man"	4:25
Total length:		46:40

== Personnel ==
Biffy Clyro

- Simon Neil – lead vocals, guitars
- James Johnston – bass guitar, backing vocals
- Ben Johnston – drums, backing vocals, percussion

Production

- Rich Costey – production, additional editing
- Biffy Clyro – co-production
- James Rushent – programming and additional production on "Wolves of Winter"
- John Feldmann – additional production and recording on "Animal Style"
- Martin Cooke – engineering
- Nicolas Fournier – engineering
- Mario Borgatta – engineering assistance
- Zak Corvine – additional engineering on "Animal Style"
- Matt Pauling – additional engineering on "Animal Style"
- Allie Snow – engineering assistance on "Animal Style"
- Zach Tuch – engineering assistance on "Animal Style"
- Vlado Meller – mastering
- Jeremy Lubsey – mastering assistance
- Ian Sefchick – vinyl mastering

== Charts ==
=== Weekly charts ===
Chart (2016)	Peak position
Australian Albums (ARIA)	15
Austrian Albums (Ö3 Austria)	5
Belgian Albums (Ultratop Flanders)	37
Belgian Albums (Ultratop Wallonia)	36
Dutch Albums (Album Top 100)	13
Finnish Albums (Suomen virallinen lista)	10
French Albums (SNEP)	74
German Albums (Offizielle Top 100)	1
Hungarian Albums (MAHASZ)	14
Irish Albums (IRMA)	1
Italian Albums (FIMI)	29
New Zealand Albums (RMNZ)	33
Norwegian Albums (VG-lista)	21
Portuguese Albums (AFP)	38
Scottish Albums (OCC)	1
Spanish Albums (Promusicae)	21
Swedish Albums (Sverigetopplistan)	49
Swiss Albums (Schweizer Hitparade)	1
UK Albums (OCC)	1
UK Rock & Metal Albums (OCC)	1
US Heatseekers Albums (Billboard)	11

=== Year-end charts ===
Chart (2016)	Position
UK Albums (OCC)	59

== Certifications ==
Region	Certification	Certified units/sales
United Kingdom (BPI)	Gold	100,000^{‡}
^{‡} Sales+streaming figures based on certification alone.
