= List of Cash Box Top 100 number-one singles of 1988 =

These are the singles that reached number one on the Top 100 Singles chart in 1988 as published by Cash Box magazine.

Key
| † | Indicates best-performing single of 1988 |

| Issue date | Song | Artist |
|---|---|---|
| January 2 | "Faith" | George Michael |
| January 9 | "Faith" | George Michael |
| January 16 | "Got My Mind Set On You" | George Harrison |
| January 23 | "The Way You Make Me Feel" | Michael Jackson |
| January 30 | "Need You Tonight" | INXS |
| February 6 | "Could've Been" | Tiffany |
| February 13 | "Could've Been" | Tiffany |
| February 20 | "What Have I Done to Deserve This?" | Pet Shop Boys (& Dusty Springfield) |
| February 27 | "Father Figure" | George Michael |
| March 5 | "Father Figure" | George Michael |
| March 12 | "Father Figure" | George Michael |
| March 19 | "Never Gonna Give You Up" | Rick Astley |
| March 26 | "Man in the Mirror" | Michael Jackson |
| April 2 | "Man in the Mirror" | Michael Jackson |
| April 9 | "Man in the Mirror" | Michael Jackson |
| April 16 | "Get Outta My Dreams, Get Into My Car" | Billy Ocean |
| April 23 | "Get Outta My Dreams, Get Into My Car" | Billy Ocean |
| April 30 | "Where Do Broken Hearts Go" | Whitney Houston |
| May 7 | "Wishing Well" | Terence Trent D'Arby |
| May 14 | "Anything For You" | Gloria Estefan and Miami Sound Machine |
| May 21 | "Anything For You" | Gloria Estefan and Miami Sound Machine |
| May 28 | "One More Try" | George Michael |
| June 4 | "One More Try" | George Michael |
| June 11 | "One More Try" | George Michael |
| June 18 | "Together Forever" | Rick Astley |
| June 25 | "Foolish Beat" | Debbie Gibson |
| July 2 | "Dirty Diana" | Michael Jackson |
| July 9 | "The Flame" | Cheap Trick |
| July 16 | "The Flame" | Cheap Trick |
| July 23 | "Pour Some Sugar On Me" | Def Leppard |
| July 30 | "Pour Some Sugar On Me" | Def Leppard |
| August 6 | "Roll With It" | Steve Winwood |
| August 13 | "Roll With It" | Steve Winwood |
| August 20 | "Roll With It" | Steve Winwood |
| August 27 | "Monkey" | George Michael |
| September 3 | "Monkey" | George Michael |
| September 10 | "Sweet Child o' Mine" † | Guns N' Roses |
| September 17 | "Sweet Child o' Mine" † | Guns N' Roses |
| September 24 | "Sweet Child o' Mine" † | Guns N' Roses |
| October 1 | "Don't Worry, Be Happy" | Bobby McFerrin |
| October 8 | "Love Bites" | Def Leppard |
| October 15 | "Red, Red Wine" | UB40 |
| October 22 | "Groovy Kind of Love" | Phil Collins |
| October 29 | "Groovy Kind of Love" | Phil Collins |
| November 5 | "Kokomo" | The Beach Boys |
| November 12 | "Kokomo" | The Beach Boys |
| November 19 | "Wild Wild West" | Escape Club |
| November 26 | "Bad Medicine" | Bon Jovi |
| December 3 | "Baby, I Love Your Way/Freebird Medley" | Will To Power |
| December 10 | "Look Away" | Chicago |
| December 17 | "Look Away" | Chicago |
| December 24 | "Every Rose Has Its Thorn" | Poison |
| December 31 | "Every Rose Has Its Thorn" | Poison |

== See also ==
- 1988 in music
- List of Hot 100 number-one singles of 1988 (U.S.)
