= List of Canadian number-one albums of 1988 =

These are the Canadian number-one albums of 1988. The charts were compiled and published by RPM every Saturday.

== Number-one albums ==
†	This indicates the best performing album of the year.

Issue date	Album	Artist	Ref
January 2	A Very Special Christmas	various artists	
January 9	A Very Special Christmas	various artists	
January 16	The Lonesome Jubilee	John Cougar Mellencamp	
January 23	Faith	George Michael	
January 30	Faith	George Michael	
February 6	Tiffany	Tiffany	
February 13	Tiffany	Tiffany	
February 20	Tiffany	Tiffany	
February 27	Dirty Dancing	Soundtrack	
March 5	Dirty Dancing	Soundtrack	
March 12	Dirty Dancing	Soundtrack	
March 19	Dirty Dancing	Soundtrack	
March 26	Dirty Dancing	Soundtrack	
April 2	Dirty Dancing	Soundtrack	
April 9	Dirty Dancing	Soundtrack	
April 16	Dirty Dancing	Soundtrack	
April 23	Dirty Dancing	Soundtrack	
April 30	Dirty Dancing	Soundtrack	
May 7	Dirty Dancing	Soundtrack	
May 14	Dirty Dancing	Soundtrack	
May 21	Dirty Dancing	Soundtrack	
May 28	Dirty Dancing	Soundtrack	
June 4	Kick †	INXS	
June 11	Kick †	INXS	
June 18	Diesel and Dust	Midnight Oil	
June 25	OU812	Van Halen	
July 2	Kick †	INXS	
July 9	Kick †	INXS	
July 16	Tracy Chapman	Tracy Chapman	
July 23	Tracy Chapman	Tracy Chapman	
July 30	Tracy Chapman	Tracy Chapman	
August 6	Tracy Chapman	Tracy Chapman	
August 13	Tracy Chapman	Tracy Chapman	
August 20	Tracy Chapman	Tracy Chapman	
August 27	Tracy Chapman	Tracy Chapman	
September 3	Tracy Chapman	Tracy Chapman	
September 10	Tracy Chapman	Tracy Chapman	
September 17	Tracy Chapman	Tracy Chapman	
September 24	Tracy Chapman	Tracy Chapman	
October 1	Tracy Chapman	Tracy Chapman	
October 8	Hysteria	Def Leppard	
October 15	Cocktail (Original Motion Picture Soundtrack)	various artists	
October 22	Cocktail (Original Motion Picture Soundtrack)	various artists	
October 29	Rattle and Hum	U2	
November 5	Rattle and Hum	U2	
November 12	Rattle and Hum	U2	
November 19	Rattle and Hum	U2	
November 26	Rattle and Hum	U2	
December 3	Rattle and Hum	U2	
December 10	Rattle and Hum	U2	
December 17	Rattle and Hum	U2	
December 24	Rattle and Hum	U2	
December 31	Rattle and Hum	U2	

== See also ==
- List of Canadian number-one singles of 1988
