= O'Chi Brown =

English singer and songwriter

- Born: Doris Gubbins; 1965? (age 59-60); Tottenham, London, England
- Genres: Dance, Lovers Rock
- Occupations: Singer and songwriter
- Years active: 1982–1988

O'Chi Brown is an English singer and songwriter born in Tottenham, London, England. She scored two hits on the Dance Club Songs, the most successful being Whenever You Need Somebody, which hit number one in 1986 on the US Dance charts but failed in the UK.

== Career ==
Doris Gubbins was born in Tottenham, London, England, presumably in 1965. She learned how to sing at a young age, and was discovered by a Trojan Records producer at age 17. Her first release was a cover of "I Can't Say Goodbye To You", which released in 1982 under Carib Gems Record Label. For unknown reasons, Gubbins changed her stagename to O'Chi Brown before the release. _{(Since Brown was 17 at the time of that single's release, in 1982, it's presumed she was born in 1965.)}

Under Sky Records, Brown released her first two studio albums, the first, "Danger Date" in 1983 to zero promotion, and "Love for You" in 1985, which had four single releases - the most successful being a cover of Procul Harum hit "A Whiter Shade Of Pale" which reached 81 on the UK Charts. This would be Brown's highest charting song. Both of the albums were mainly Lovers Rock covers and saw little success outside of this single.

Following Brown's "Unchained Melody" cover, she switched her genre from Lovers Rock to Dance music with the single "Why Can't We Be Friends" which reached #88 on the UK Charts. This track caught the attention of producers Stock Aitken Waterman, who signed with O'Chi to their label. Their first single together, released in November 1985, was a song called "Whenever You Need Somebody" which hit number one on the US Dance charts and #97 on the UK Charts. Despite strong demand, the song's further progress on the US charts was thwarted when stocks of the record ran out.

The song's producers (Stock Aitken Waterman) would recycle the song for English singer Rick Astley a year later, and it would be the title of his debut studio album on PWL.

Brown stuck with Stock Aitken Waterman to her next single release, "100% Pure Pain" which also only reached #97 on the UK Charts. It was written to mimic the style of the Janet Jackson song "What Have You Done For Me Lately", and was also the first track written with an album in mind. The album, O'Chi, would release shortly after the single in 1986. It was followed by the single "Two Hearts Beating As One" (also marketed as "Wedding Song)" which had no success on the charts, likely due to the fact the song did not have a music video.

Brown then left SAW in early 1987 following creative differences, and she produced a cover of "Rock Your Baby" which was not successful. After that single, Brown began working on her fourth studio album, "Light The Night" which, like her first two albums, contained a mix of lovers rock covers and original songs. It only featured one single, a cover of Four Tops song "I Got A Feeling", which failed to chart. Interestingly, the B-Side was a re-recorded version of "Lady", an album track from her 1986 album.

Abruptly, though, in 1987, following the success of Rick Astley's single "Never Gonna Give You Up", SAW released an album track "Learning To Live (Without Your Love)" from Brown's 1986 album as a cash-in single in 1987. The track was a duet with Astley, but the two singers never met. It peaked at #103 on the UK Charts and was O'Chi's last charting song there.

Following "Light The Night", Brown released one final single in 1988, "Groove Me", before retiring from the music industry.

In episodes 12 and 29 of A Journey Through Stock Aitken Waterman; O'Chi made her first appearance to the public in over 30 years, discussing what it was like to work with the producing trio and also giving hints as to where she'd been and why she stopped making music.

== Discography ==
=== Albums ===
- Danger Date (1983)
- Love for You (1985)
- O'Chi (1986)
- Light the Night (1987)

=== Singles ===
Year	Single	Peak chart positions		
Year	Single	US R&B	US Dance	UK
1982	"I Can't Say Goodbye to You"	―	—	—
1983	"A Whiter Shade of Pale"	―	―	81
1984	"Answer Me"	—	―	―
1984	"Auld Lang Syne"	—	—	—
1985	"Unchained Melody"	―	―	―
1985	"Why Can't We Be Friends"	―	―	88
1985	"Whenever You Need Somebody"	88	1	97
1986	"100% Pure Pain"	73	23	97
1986	"Two Hearts Beating as One"	―	―	—
1987	"Rock Your Baby"	—	―	―
1987	"I Got a Feeling"	―	―	—
1987	"Learning to Live (Without Your Love)"	―	―	103
1988	"Groove Me"	—	―	―
"—" denotes releases that did not chart or were not released in that territory.

== See also ==
- List of Number 1 Dance Hits (United States)
- List of artists who reached number one on the US Dance chart
