= List of number-one singles of 1988 (Canada) =

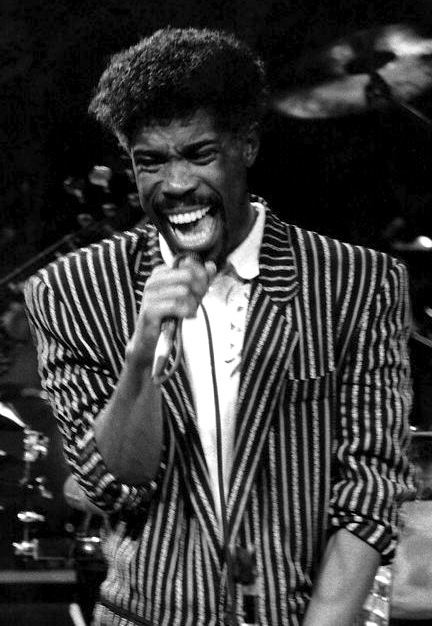
Trinidadian-English singer Billy Ocean remained at number one for a four-week spell with "Get Outta My Dreams, Get into My Car", eventually claiming 1988's highest-selling single with the aforementioned record.

RPM was a Canadian magazine that published the best-performing singles of Canada from 1964 to 2000. Twenty-five singles peak atop the RPM Singles Chart in 1988. "Faith" by George Michael held the top position from 1987 into 1988, and Chicago achieved the final number-one hit of the year with "Look Away". Eight musical acts peaked at number one in Canada for the first time this year: M|A|R|R|S, Rick Astley, Terence Trent D'Arby, Midnight Oil, INXS, Cheap Trick, Tracy Chapman, and Bobby McFerrin. No Canadian acts topped the chart this year.

1988 was a successful year for British musical acts in Canada. Trinidadian-English singer Billy Ocean had the most successful single of the year with "Get Outta My Dreams, Get into My Car", which topped the chart for four weeks in April. However, it was George Michael who picked up the most number-one singles in 1988, topping the RPM Singles Chart with "Faith", "One More Try", "Monkey", and "Kissing a Fool". In total, Michael stayed at the summit for seven weeks. Meanwhile, a third English singer, Rick Astley, accumulated eight weeks at number one with three hits: "Never Gonna Give You Up", "Together Forever", and "It Would Take a Strong Strong Man", the most out of any artist during the year.

Along with "Get Outta My Dreams, Get into My Car" and "Together Forever", "Desire" by Irish band U2 was the joint-longest-running number-one track of 1988, staying at the top for four weeks in November and December. George Harrison, Tiffany, M|A|R|R|S, Elton John, and Phil Collins all stayed at number one for three weeks with their sole 1988 number ones. This year, only two female acts obtained a number-one hit: Tiffany and Tracy Chapman.

Key
† Indicates best-performing single of 1988

== Chart history ==
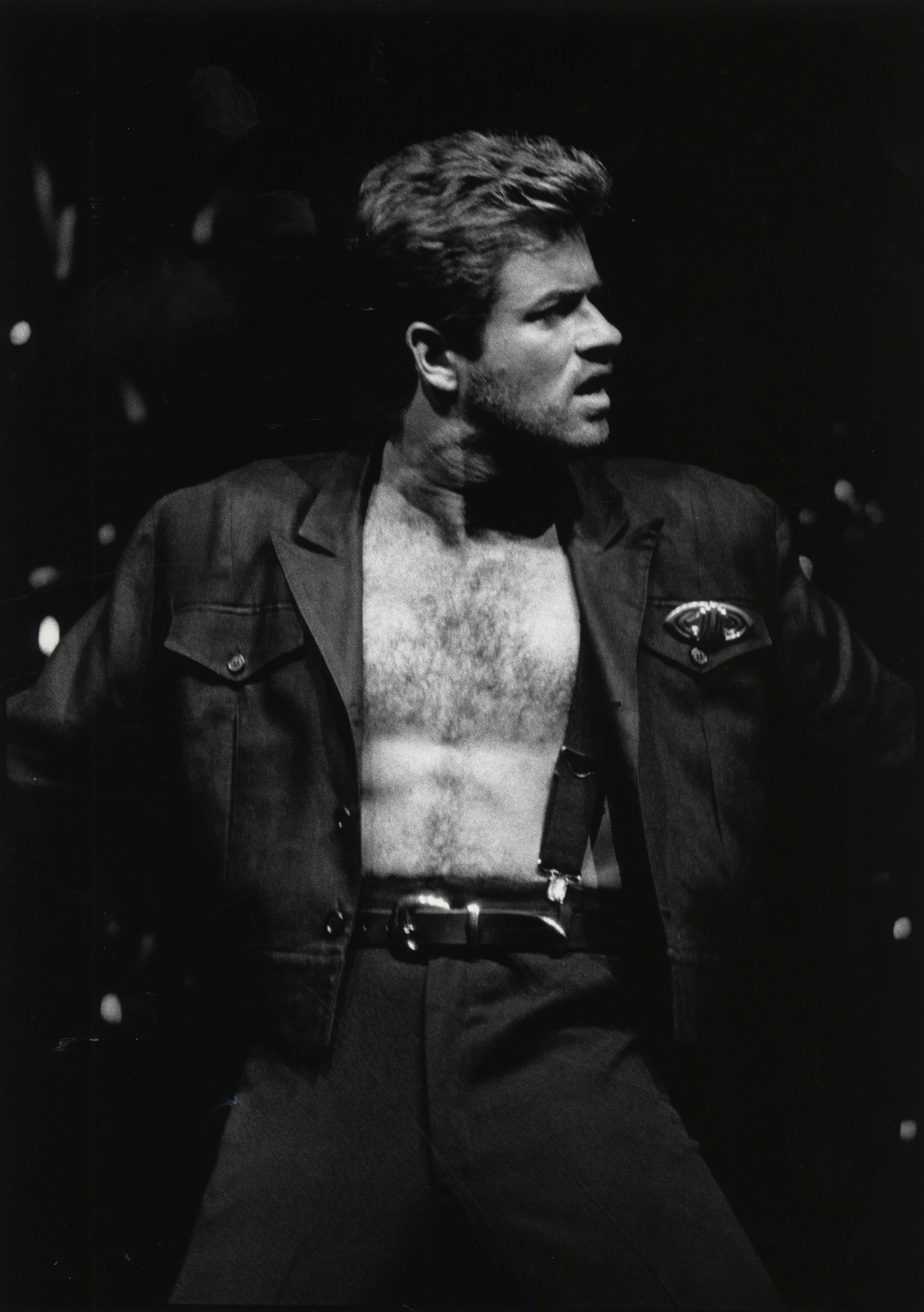
George Michael scored four different number-one singles in 1988: "Faith", "One More Try", "Monkey", "Kissing a Fool".

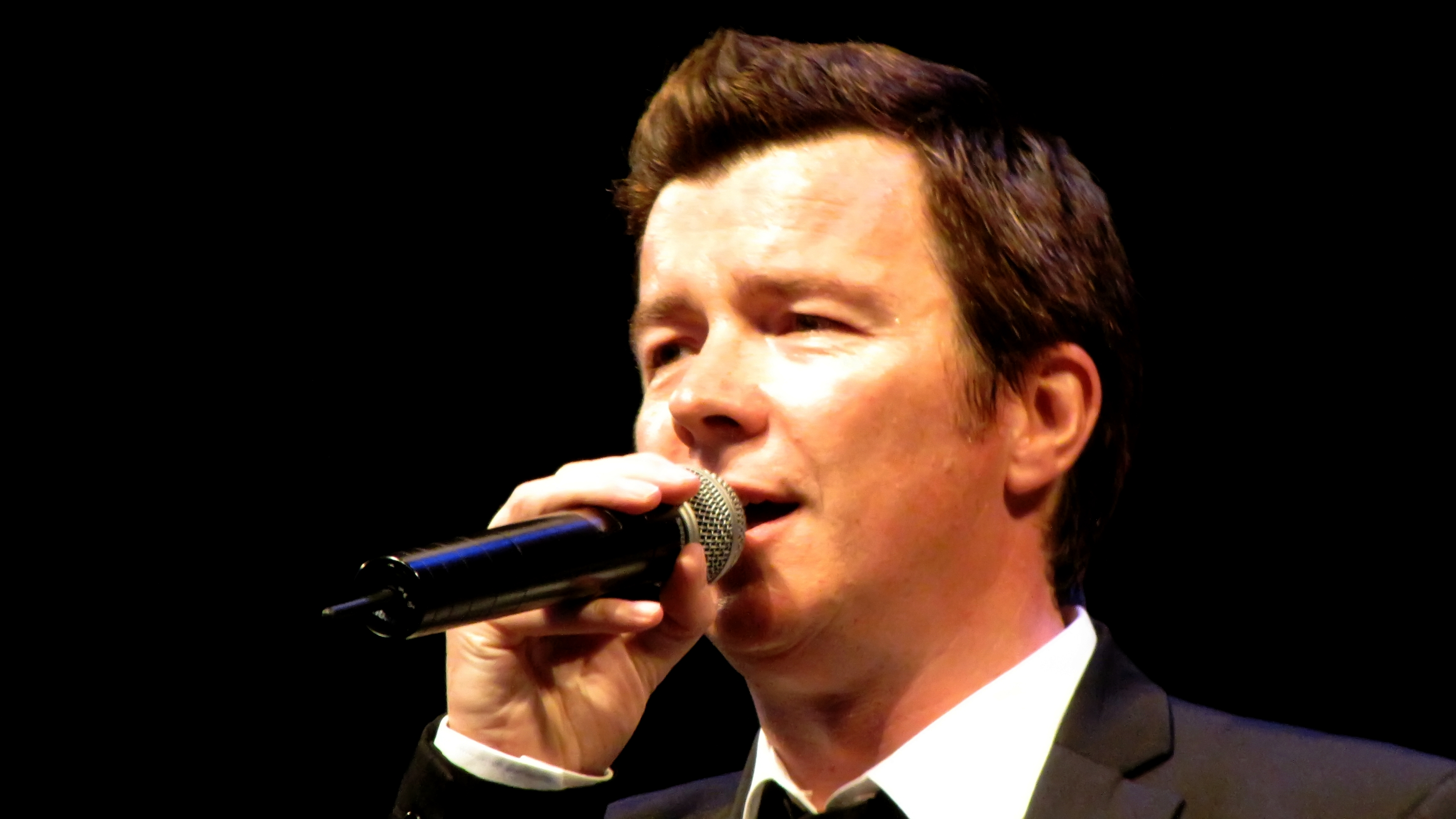
Rick Astley spent eight weeks at number one with three hits: "Never Gonna Give You Up", "Together Forever", and "It Would Take a Strong Strong Man".

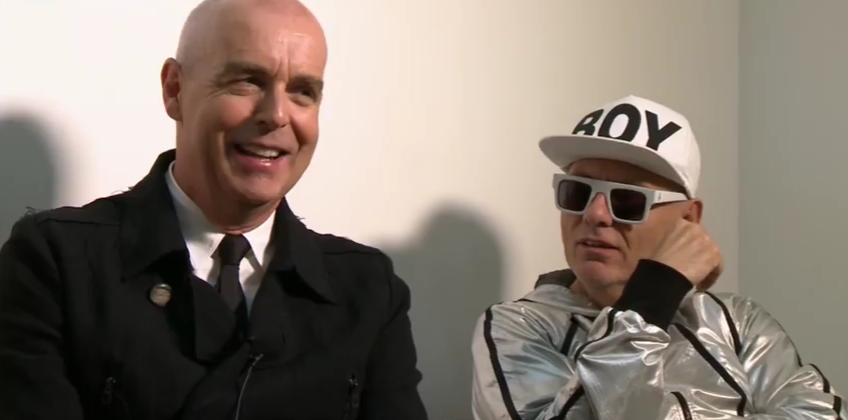
Pet Shop Boys' rendition of "Always on My Mind" spent two issues at number one in late May.

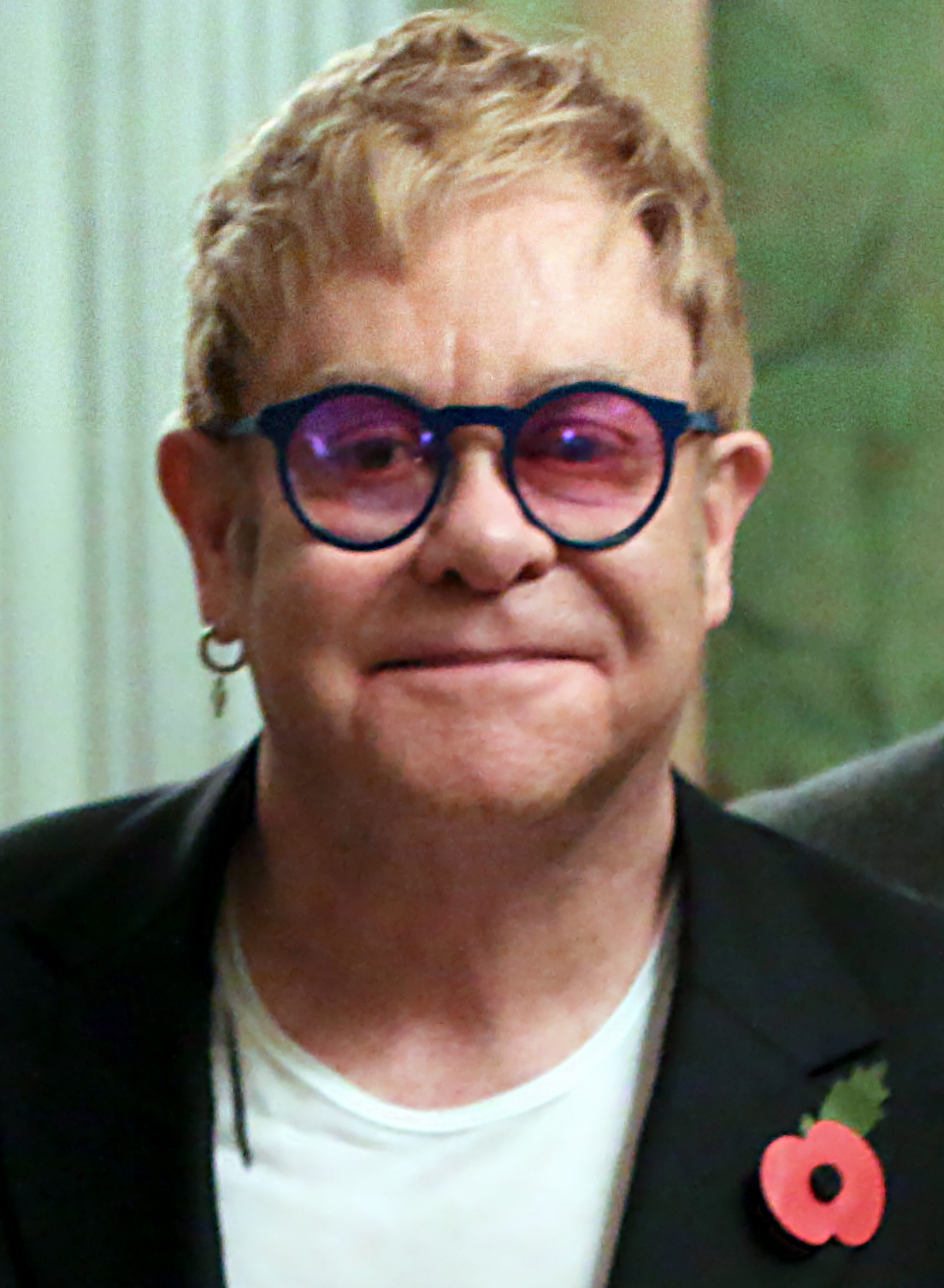
Elton John's "I Don't Wanna Go On with You Like That" gave him three weeks at number one in 1988.

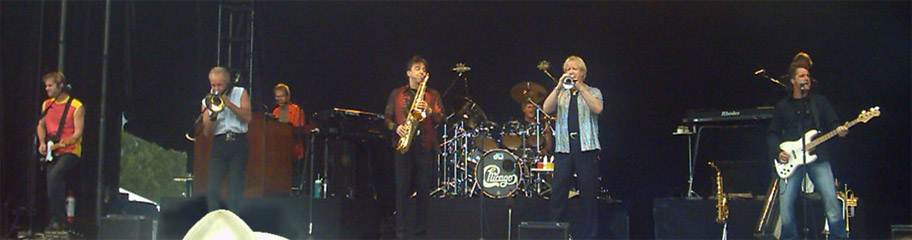
With "Look Away", American rock band Chicago were the last act to top the RPM singles chart in 1988.

Issue date	Song	Artist	Reference
2 January (Note: Due to a two-week break in publication over the 1987/1988 New Year period, the weeks of 2 January and 9 January is inferred.)	"Faith"	George Michael	
9 January	"Faith"	George Michael	
16 January	"Got My Mind Set on You"	George Harrison	
23 January	"Got My Mind Set on You"	George Harrison	
30 January	"Got My Mind Set on You"	George Harrison	
6 February	"Could've Been"	Tiffany	
13 February	"Could've Been"	Tiffany	
20 February	"Could've Been"	Tiffany	
27 February	"Pump Up the Volume"	M|A|R|R|S	
5 March	"Pump Up the Volume"	M|A|R|R|S	
12 March	"Pump Up the Volume"	M|A|R|R|S	
19 March	"Never Gonna Give You Up"	Rick Astley	
26 March	"Never Gonna Give You Up"	Rick Astley	
2 April	"Never Gonna Give You Up"	Rick Astley	
9 April	"Get Outta My Dreams, Get into My Car"†	Billy Ocean	
16 April	"Get Outta My Dreams, Get into My Car"†	Billy Ocean	
23 April	"Get Outta My Dreams, Get into My Car"†	Billy Ocean	
30 April	"Get Outta My Dreams, Get into My Car"†	Billy Ocean	
7 May	"Wishing Well"	Terence Trent D'Arby	
14 May	"Wishing Well"	Terence Trent D'Arby	
21 May	"Always on My Mind"	Pet Shop Boys	
28 May	"Always on My Mind"	Pet Shop Boys	
4 June	"Beds Are Burning"	Midnight Oil	
11 June	"One More Try"	George Michael	
18 June	"One More Try"	George Michael	
25 June	"Together Forever"	Rick Astley	
2 July	"Together Forever"	Rick Astley	
9 July	"Together Forever"	Rick Astley	
16 July	"Together Forever"	Rick Astley	
23 July	"New Sensation"	INXS	
30 July	"The Flame"	Cheap Trick	
6 August	"Roll with It"	Steve Winwood	
13 August	"I Don't Wanna Go On with You Like That"	Elton John	
20 August	"I Don't Wanna Go On with You Like That"	Elton John	
27 August	"I Don't Wanna Go On with You Like That"	Elton John	
3 September	"Fast Car"	Tracy Chapman	
10 September	"Perfect World"	Huey Lewis and the News	
17 September	"Monkey"	George Michael	
24 September	"Monkey"	George Michael	
1 October	"It Would Take a Strong Strong Man"	Rick Astley	
8 October	"One Good Woman"	Peter Cetera	
15 October	"Don't Worry, Be Happy"	Bobby McFerrin	
22 October	"Don't Worry, Be Happy"	Bobby McFerrin	
29 October	"A Groovy Kind of Love"	Phil Collins	
5 November	"A Groovy Kind of Love"	Phil Collins	
12 November	"A Groovy Kind of Love"	Phil Collins	
19 November	"Desire"	U2	
26 November	"Desire"	U2	
3 December	"Desire"	U2	
10 December	"Desire"	U2	
17 December	"Kissing a Fool"	George Michael	
24 December	"Look Away"	Chicago	
31 December (Note: Due to a two-week break in publication over the 1988/1989 Christmas/New Year period, the week of 31 December is inferred.)	"Look Away"	Chicago	

== See also ==
- 1988 in music
- List of Billboard Hot 100 number ones of 1988
