= List of number-one hits of 1988 (Flanders) =

These hits topped the Ultratop 50 in the Flanders region of Belgium in 1988.

Date	Artist	Title
January 2	George Michael	"Faith"
January 9	Rick Astley	"When I Fall in Love"
January 16	Rick Astley	"When I Fall in Love"
January 23	T'Pau	"China in Your Hand"
January 30	T'Pau	"China in Your Hand"
February 6	Bill Medley & Jennifer Warnes	"(I've Had) The Time of My Life"
February 13	Bill Medley & Jennifer Warnes	"(I've Had) The Time of My Life"
February 20	Bill Medley & Jennifer Warnes	"(I've Had) The Time of My Life"
February 27	Bill Medley & Jennifer Warnes	"(I've Had) The Time of My Life"
March 5	Bill Medley & Jennifer Warnes	"(I've Had) The Time of My Life"
March 12	Bill Medley & Jennifer Warnes	"(I've Had) The Time of My Life"
March 19	Bill Medley & Jennifer Warnes	"(I've Had) The Time of My Life"
March 26	Bill Medley & Jennifer Warnes	"(I've Had) The Time of My Life"
April 2	Billy Ocean	"Get Outta My Dreams, Get into My Car"
April 9	Billy Ocean	"Get Outta My Dreams, Get into My Car"
April 16	Eddy Grant	"Gimme Hope Jo'anna"
April 23	Eddy Grant	"Gimme Hope Jo'anna"
April 30	Eddy Grant	"Gimme Hope Jo'anna"
May 7	Eddy Grant	"Gimme Hope Jo'anna"
May 14	Eddy Grant	"Gimme Hope Jo'anna"
May 21	Eddy Grant	"Gimme Hope Jo'anna"
May 28	Mory Kante	"Yé ké yé ké"
June 4	Mory Kante	"Yé ké yé ké"
June 11	Mory Kante	"Yé ké yé ké"
June 18	Fleetwood Mac	"Everywhere"
June 25	S'Express	"Theme From S'Express"
July 2	S'Express	"Theme From S'Express"
July 9	Michael Jackson	"Dirty Diana"
July 16	Michael Jackson	"Dirty Diana"
July 23	Tracy Chapman	"Fast Car"
July 30	Tracy Chapman	"Fast Car"
August 6	Tracy Chapman	"Fast Car"
August 13	Salt-N-Pepa	"Push It"
August 20	Salt-N-Pepa	"Push It"
August 27	The Pasadenas	"Tribute (Right On)"
September 3	The Pasadenas	"Tribute (Right On)"
September 10	The Pasadenas	"Tribute (Right On)"
September 17	Sam Brown	"Stop!"
September 24	Sam Brown	"Stop!"
October 1	Sam Brown	"Stop!"
October 8	Sam Brown	"Stop!"
October 15	Yazz	"The Only Way Is Up"
October 22	Yazz	"The Only Way Is Up"
October 29	Phil Collins	"A Groovy Kind of Love"
November 5	Phil Collins	"A Groovy Kind of Love"
November 12	Womack & Womack	"Teardrops"
November 19	Womack & Womack	"Teardrops"
November 26	Womack & Womack	"Teardrops"
December 3	Wee Papa Girl Rappers	"Wee Rule"
December 10	Wee Papa Girl Rappers	"Wee Rule"
December 17	Enya	"Orinoco Flow"
December 24	Enya	"Orinoco Flow"
December 31	Enya	"Orinoco Flow"

== See also ==
- 1988 in music
