= Whenever You Need Somebody (song) =

British song written and produced by Stock Atiken Waterman

"Whenever You Need Somebody" is a song written and produced by Stock Aitken Waterman, which became successful for two of their artists, namely O'Chi Brown and Rick Astley.

== O'Chi Brown version ==
"Whenever You Need Somebody"

Single by O'Chi Brown

from the album O'Chi
- Released: November 1985
- Recorded: 1985
- Genre: Dance-pop
- Length: 3:23
- Label: Magnetic
- Songwriter: Stock Aitken Waterman
- Producer: Stock Aitken Waterman

O'Chi Brown singles chronology
"Why Can't We Be Friends" (1985)	"Whenever You Need Somebody" (1985)	"100% Pure Pain" (1986)

"Whenever You Need Somebody" was originally written for British singer O'Chi Brown, and released in November 1985 on Magnet Records. It became a minor hit for Brown in the UK Singles Chart, peaking at number 97 there. According to Brown, the popularity of the track "caught people [in the industry] by surprise", with producer Pete Waterman left "on the warpath" over the lack of support for the track.

The single was later released in 1986 in the US, where it became a number one hit on the dance charts. It failed to chart on the Billboard Hot 100, however, due to a lack of available stock in record stores. According to Brown, "They didn't have the physical disc, they'd run out of the physical discs."

The song was later included in Brown's studio album O'Chi, released in 1986. When the song was covered by Rick Astley in 1987, Magnet reissued the single in 12" format with new mixes in late 1987.

=== Charts ===
Weekly chart performance for "Whenever You Need Somebody"
Chart (1985–1986)	Peak position
UK Singles (OCC)	97
US Hot Dance Club Play (Billboard)	1
US Hot R&B/Hip-Hop Songs (Billboard)	88

== Rick Astley version ==
"Whenever You Need Somebody"

Single by Rick Astley

from the album Whenever You Need Somebody
- Released: 19 October 1987
- Recorded: 1987
- Genre: Dance-pop
- Length: 3:26 (radio edit)
- Label: RCA
- Songwriter: Stock Aitken Waterman
- Producer: Stock Aitken Waterman

Rick Astley singles chronology
"Learning to Live (Without Your Love)" (1987)	"Whenever You Need Somebody" (1987)	"When I Fall in Love" / "My Arms Keep Missing You" (1987)

Music video
- "Whenever You Need Somebody" on YouTube

In 1987, Rick Astley covered the song, as SAW rushed to gather strong follow up material in the wake of the unexpected global mega-success of "Never Gonna Give You Up". The song would become the title track and second single from Astley's multi-million selling debut album Whenever You Need Somebody, also written and produced by Stock Aitken Waterman. It was a successful European hit for Astley, reaching No. 1 in seven countries, continuing the success of his previous smash single. Though not released as a single in the U.S., it was released as the 4th single in Canada. The girl part of the music video was shot at Las Canteras beach and at the adjacent Hotel Reina Isabel in Las Palmas de Gran Canaria. In 2019, Astley recorded and released a 'Reimagined' version of the song for his album The Best of Me, which features a new piano arrangement.

=== Critical reception ===
Professional ratings
Review scores
Source	Rating
Number One	4/5 stars

Richard James and Jenny Jay of Number One praised "Whenever You Need Somebody" as being "a very good song", stating that "it's very commercial and [Astley's] voice is just brillant", and considered SAW "a right set of genuises". Jerry Smith of British magazine Music Week described the song an "uninspired, high energy dance track", but predicted its success on the charts. In a review published in Smash Hits, Robert Smith of the Cure stated he did not really like Astley's "weird" voice, unfavourably comparing him to Mel and Kim, who he said were "a million times more attractive and funny", and considered the song "incredibly bland", after having underlined the song's making process by SAW which he found "surreal". Retrospectively, in 2025, Thomas Edward of Smooth Radio ranked the song number four in his list of "Rick Astley's 10 greatest songs, ever".

Discussing Astley's success with the track she'd originated, Brown complimented the singer on his voice and praised the chart performance of his cover, but noted, "I like mine better, what can I tell you? Rick's got a great voice, but I just felt that the song suited a woman, and I felt it suited my voice. I'm not going to say mine was better, but I liked mine more."

=== Chart performance ===
Astley's version of "Whenever You Need Somebody" was a major hit on the charts, being a top five hit in almost all the countries where it was released. In the UK, it started at number 11 on 31 October 1987, then climbed to number three, a position it hold for non consecutive three weeks, and stayed on the chart for 12 weeks. It topped the charts in seven European countries, including the Walloon region of Belgium, Finland, Italy, Sweden, Switzerland, and West Germany. In the latter country, it charted for 16 weeks, with four of them spent at number one. It also peaked at number two in Belgium (Flanders), Denmark, the Netherlands, Norway and Spain, number three in Australia and Ireland, number four in Austria, number nine in New Zealand, and number seven in South Africa. It barely failed to reach the top ten in France and Iceland, where it peaked at number 11 and 17 respectively. On the overall Eurochart Hot 100 singles chart established by the Music & Media magazine, it started at number 53 on 7 November 1987, peaked at number four for three weeks, behind Astley's previous single "Never Gonna Give You Up", and spent 33 weeks on the chart. It also peaked at number two on the European Airplay Top 50 and totalled 14 weeks on the chart.

=== Track listing ===
- 7" single
1. "Whenever You Need Somebody" – 3:26
2. "Just Good Friends" – 3:45
- 7" single – picture disc
1. "Whenever You Need Somebody" – 3:26
2. "Just Good Friends" – 3:45
- 12" maxi
1. "Whenever You Need Somebody" (Lonely Hearts mix) – 7:34
2. "Whenever You Need Somebody" (instrumental) – 3:50
3. "Just Good Friends" – 3:45
- 12" / cassette single
1. "Whenever You Need Somebody" – 7:52
2. "Whenever You Need Somebody" (instrumental) – 4:38
3. "Just Good Friends" – 3:40
- 12" promo
1. "Whenever You Need Somebody" (Lonely Hearts mix) – 7:34
2. "Whenever You Need Somebody" (7" version) – 3:27
3. "Whenever You Need Somebody" (remix) – 7:57
4. "Whenever You Need Somebody" (remix dub) – 4:39

=== Charts ===
==== Weekly charts ====
Weekly chart performance for "Whenever You Need Somebody"
Chart (1987–1988)	Peak position
Australia (Kent Music Report)	3
Austria (Ö3 Austria Top 40)	4
Belgium (Ultratop 50 Flanders)	2
Belgium (Ultratop 40 Wallonia)	1
Denmark (IFPI)	2
Europe (Eurochart Hot 100)	4
Europe (European Airplay Top 50)	2
Finland (Suomen virallinen lista)	1
France (SNEP)	11
Iceland (RÚV)	17
Ireland (IRMA)	3
Italy (Musica e dischi)	1
Italy Airplay (Music & Media)	6
Luxembourg (Radio Luxembourg)	3
Netherlands (Dutch Top 40)	2
Netherlands (Single Top 100)	2
New Zealand (Recorded Music NZ)	9
Norway (VG-lista)	2
Quebec (ADISQ)	37
South Africa (Springbok Radio)	7
Spain (AFYVE)	2
Sweden (Sverigetopplistan)	1
Switzerland (Schweizer Hitparade)	1
UK Singles (OCC)	3
UK Dance (Music Week)	1
West Germany (GfK)	1

==== Year-end charts ====
1987 year-end chart performance for "Whenever You Need Somebody"
Chart (1987)	Position
Netherlands (Dutch Top 40)	46
UK Singles (OCC)	26

1988 year-end chart performance for "Whenever You Need Somebody"
Chart (1988)	Position
Australia (ARIA)	12
Europe (European Hot 100 Singles)	69
West Germany (Media Control)	28

1985–1989 chart performance for "Whenever You Need Somebody"
Chart (1985–1989)	Position
Europe (European Hot 100 Singles)	95
