= So Emotional =

1987 single by Whitney Houston

Single by Whitney Houston

from the album Whitney
- B-side: "For the Love of You"
- Released: October 12, 1987
- Recorded: March 1, 1987
- Studio: Right Track Recording
- Genre: Dance-pop; rock; pop rock; synth-funk
- Length: 4:36
- Label: Arista
- Songwriters: Billy Steinberg; Tom Kelly
- Producer: Narada Michael Walden

Whitney Houston singles chronology
"Didn't We Almost Have It All" (1987)	"So Emotional" (1987)	"Where Do Broken Hearts Go" (1988)

Music video
- "So Emotional" on YouTube

"So Emotional" is a song recorded by American singer Whitney Houston. It was released on October 12, 1987, by Arista Records, as the third single from her second studio album Whitney (1987). The song was written by Billy Steinberg and Tom Kelly and produced by Narada Michael Walden. The song's musical composition was inspired by the Minneapolis sound productions of Prince.

Upon its release, the song received mixed reviews from music critics. Commercially, however, it was successful, peaking at number one on the Billboard Hot 100, where it became her sixth consecutive number one, breaking a record originally set by Elvis Presley two decades earlier as the solo artist with the most consecutive number-one singles in Billboard Hot 100 history and tying her with the Beatles and the Bee Gees for the most consecutive number one singles on the Hot 100 at the time.

A remixed version by Junior Vasquez and Shep Pettibone later sent the song to number one on the magazine's Dance Club Play chart, giving Houston her second number one dance hit. It was also successful on its R&B and adult contemporary charts, reaching the top ten in both. In doing so, it became Houston's third single to reach the top ten in four successive Billboard charts after "How Will I Know" and "I Wanna Dance with Somebody (Who Loves Me)".

It was the sixth best-charting song of 1988, and the fourth best-charting song on the club charts according to Billboard; it is her sixth biggest all-time hit on the Hot 100 chart.

It was also successful outside North America. In the UK, the song became Houston's fifth top ten hit, peaking at number 5. It would also reach the top ten in Canada, Finland and Ireland and would top the charts in Luxembourg while reaching the top 20 in Belgium, Spain, the Netherlands and South Africa and the top 40 in other countries such as Australia, Germany and France.

Considered one of her signature songs, it later received retrospective accolades by magazines such as Slant and Entertainment Weekly as well as the website About.com and the channels MTV and BET, all of whom ranked the song as one of Houston's best songs in her catalog.

== Composition and recording ==
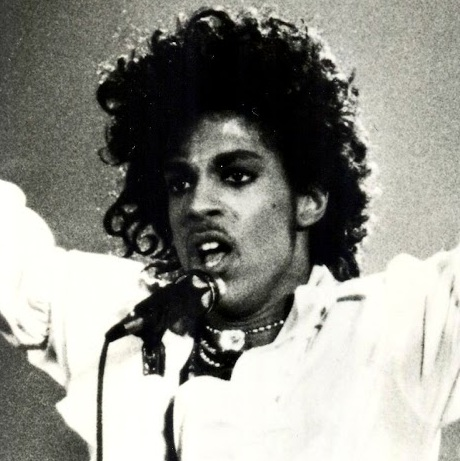
Prince (pictured in 1984) was the inspiration behind the composition of "So Emotional".

"So Emotional" was written by rock songwriters Billy Steinberg and Tom Kelly. Prior to composing the song, the team of Steinberg and Kelly had composed the number one hits, "Like a Virgin" and "True Colors" by Madonna and Cyndi Lauper respectively, which led to Arista head Clive Davis contacting the duo to compose an uptempo song for Houston. Up until then, Davis had assembled ten songs for Houston's upcoming second album, Whitney, but told the duo he needed one more uptempo song.

Steinberg explained to Songfacts: "A lot of songwriters get together and the first question they ask each other is, 'Who do you want to write for?' Tom and I had never done that because I find it restricting and we both like to write a song for the song's sake and not try to aim at a particular recording artist. In the case of 'So Emotional,' Tom and I had a regular dialogue with Clive Davis and he advised us that he was looking for an uptempo song for Whitney Houston, so we really tried to write for that."

Steinberg and Kelly recorded a demo of the song with musician Prince in mind as they were huge fans of his, with Kelly singing in falsetto. The production Steinberg and Kelly gave in the demo sounded like most of Prince's Minneapolis sound productions at the time. The song centers on a woman who falls in love with one of her "old flames" despite the fact that she has another man, and admits "get[ting] so emotional" thinking of him. The recording was overseen by producer Narada Michael Walden at Manhattan's Right Track Studios in March 1987. According to Steinberg, the synthesized funk rock production by Walden differed from their demo.

The day of the recording, Houston was scheduled to make minor changes to existing tracks for the album. Upon arrival, Walden advised Houston to record "So Emotional" first, before she had warmed up, resulting in a fresh, edgy sound. During its recording, rock singer and Rolling Stones front man Mick Jagger entered the studio upon hearing the song and danced along to Walden and Houston's delight. The song was Houston's first venture into rock music. It would also be one of her first songs where she recorded all the background vocals herself. Houston was credited with vocal arrangement on the song as she would for all of the songs featured on her sophomore album.

Although the recording became a number-one hit, the production was bittersweet for the songwriters. As Steinberg explained in an interview, "If you fall in love with (your) version of the song, and you're used to hearing it the way you conceived it ... it's always hard to get used to." Still, the songwriters were proud of the song and of Houston's recording of it, with Steinberg stating that while it wasn't "as revolutionary a song as "Like a Virgin" or as meaningful a song as "True Colors", it is still a strong pop song."

Considered a dance-pop and rock song with R&B, synth-pop and funk influences, "So Emotional" has a time signature of 4/4 common time and a dance-rock tempo of 120 beats per minute according to Musicnotes.com under Sony Music Publishing, the song is mostly played to the key of Em_{7}, with Houston's vocal range going from B_{3} to F♯_{5}.

== Critical reception ==
AllMusic editor Ron Wynn highlighted this track.

In their "Feature Picks" section on its October 31, 1987 issue, Cashbox called the song "a playful dance/pop tune will undoubtedly follow in Houston's radio and chart success. Headed straight for the top."

Vince Aletti of Rolling Stone wrote: "Walden covers all these bases, out-hopping Kashif (but not Jellybean) with "So Emotional."

In their St. Petersburg Times review of the album, Eric Snider and Annelise Wamsley wrote of the song: "So Emotional," the record's token rock offering, is hollow and contrived, as if the trumped-up power guitars are supposed to give the song some guts."

Zodiac Mindwarp of Smash Hits considered "So Emotional" "a good record" that he liked and which was likely to "put [him] in a good mood for the day".

== Chart performance ==
"So Emotional" broke a 27-year chart record set by Elvis Presley for the most consecutive number one singles by a solo artist on the Billboard Hot 100.

"So Emotional" made its debut at number 47 as the Hot Shot Debut on the Billboard Hot 100 for the week of October 31, 1987. Six weeks later, on the December 5 issue, it entered the top ten at number 8, becoming her third top ten single to be released in the same year, the first time Houston had accomplished such a feat. Five weeks later, it became the first new number-one single of 1988, reaching the pole position on January 9, replacing George Michael's "Faith" where it stayed for a week, eventually receiving gold certification in the US seven years later in 1995. In January 2023, nearly 28 years after its last certification, the song was certified platinum for sales of one million copies in the US alone. It became Steinberg and Kelly's fourth composition to top the Billboard Hot 100 after "Like a Virgin", "True Colors" and "Alone" by the rock band Heart. "So Emotional" spent eight weeks inside the top ten of the Billboard Hot 100 while spending fourteen weeks inside the top 40 and spent a cumulative total of nineteen weeks on the chart altogether.

Houston broke a 27-year chart record held by Elvis Presley for the most consecutive number-one singles by a solo artist; Presley had held the record with five major singles — "A Big Hunk O' Love", "Stuck On You", "It's Now or Never", "Are You Lonesome Tonight?" and "Surrender" — each topping the charts between 1959 and 1961. With six consecutive number one singles at the time, it put her in a three-way tie with the Beatles and the Bee Gees for most consecutive number one singles, a record she'd later break with the ballad, "Where Do Broken Hearts Go", on April 23 of the same year. It also put her in another three-way tie with artists Michael Jackson and Madonna for the most number one singles of the 1980s. The single also reached number one on Billboard's Hot Dance Club Play chart as well as the Crossover Top 30 chart.

Due to Houston's crossover appeal, the dance-rock track reached number eight on the adult contemporary chart and number five on the Hot Black Singles chart, with the latter position marking the first time since "Thinking About You" (1985) where Houston had a song peak below the top three of the R&B charts but was still her ninth consecutive top ten record on the chart. It was also her first single since 1984 to peak below the top five of the Adult Contemporary chart and broke Houston's streak of five consecutive number one hits on that chart. It was Houston's third single to reach the top ten on four major Billboard charts after "How Will I Know" and "I Wanna Dance with Somebody (Who Loves Me)". It is Houston's sixth best charting song of all time on the Billboard Hot 100.

In the United Kingdom and France the song was remixed by Shep Pettibone when released as a single and peaked at number five on the UK Singles Chart in November 1987, remaining on the chart for 11 weeks. In Canada, the song peaked at number nine, giving Houston her seventh consecutive top ten hit in the country. Elsewhere, the single performed moderately well, peaking inside the top ten in Finland and Ireland where it peaked at number three. It topped the charts in Luxembourg. It also reached the top 20 in Belgium, Spain, the Netherlands and South Africa, number 21 in France, 26 in Australia and 30 in Switzerland. It reached number 20 on the Eurochart Hot 100. Since its release, the song has sold more than 1.7 million copies worldwide.

== Music video ==
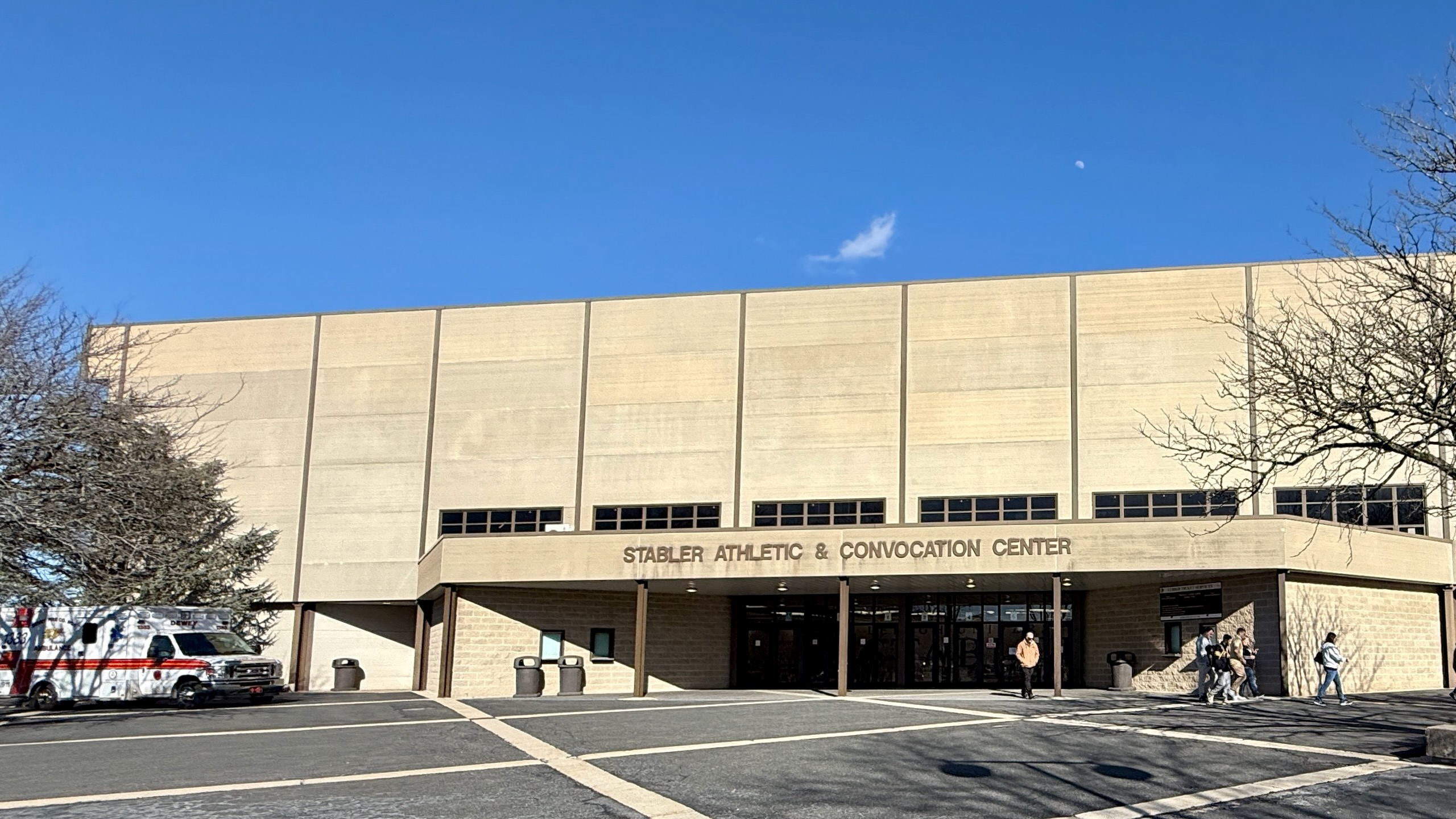
The music video was recorded at Stabler Arena in Bethlehem, Pennsylvania.

The music video for "So Emotional" was directed by Wayne Isham during a brief break in Houston's Moment of Truth World Tour. According to an article by the Morning Call, 2,500 fans of the singer were admitted by free tickets given away at area record stores in the days leading up to the shoot. The singer reportedly rehearsed for 17 days in preparation for the video.

Prior to directing the video, Isham had been known for producing hard rock and heavy metal videos for the likes of Mötley Crüe ("Home Sweet Home", "Girls, Girls, Girls"), Bon Jovi ("You Give Love a Bad Name", "Livin' on a Prayer") and Judas Priest ("Turbo Lover"). Houston became one of the first female solo artists to work on a video with Isham. Like most of Isham's music videos at the time, Houston recorded a live "in concert" performance music video at Lehigh University's Stabler Arena in Bethlehem, Pennsylvania where Houston is seen first rehearsing the song with her band and later performing it in front of a live audience. It was reportedly the first music video filmed at the arena.

Houston came with her own wardrobe, which consisted of a black leather jacket, white tank top, blue denim jeans and boots in the rehearsal portion and a gray metallic blazer and black miniskirt ensemble during the live performance; the look and the video itself differed from Houston's more glamorous and colorful music videos such as "I Wanna Dance with Somebody (Who Loves Me)" and "How Will I Know". The song's producer Narada Michael Walden participated in the video playing drums.

The video had its world premiere on MTV in November 1987 and quickly attained heavy rotation a couple weeks later, achieving similar success on both BET and Night Tracks via a remixed version by Junior Vasquez and Shep Pettibone on the latter channels due to its house sound. The video was uploaded on Houston's official YouTube channel in October 2009 and has since accumulated more than 30 million views on the platform.

== Live performances ==
Houston performed the song in three of her world tours and three of her territorial tours.

The song was not performed on the 1987 North American leg of her Moment of Truth World Tour but was performed throughout the global legs of the tour throughout its 1988 itinerary. During the performances of the song on the tour, Houston often performed it with a higher pitch and faster hard rock tempo, with Houston performing it while backed by dancers performing choreography. The song would be the fourth song performed on the setlist after "Didn't We Almost Have It All", "Love Will Save the Day" and "You Give Good Love".

For the Feels So Right Japan tour (1990) and I'm Your Baby Tonight World Tour (1991), the song was performed in its original pitch but under a slower hip-hop arrangement with Houston and her male dancers doing more elaborate choreography with Houston wearing a catsuit and headpiece. This time, the song was performed after "I Wanna Dance with Somebody (Who Loves Me)".

For the second North American and South African legs of The Bodyguard World Tour in 1994, the song was given a funk rock arrangement including horns with Houston avoiding the choreography but still surrounded by female dancers. This arrangement would be performed for the Pacific Rim Tour (1997) and the European Tour (1998).

Houston performed the song live on television as well. Houston gave a performance of the song alongside "Didn't We Almost Have It All" on Power Hits 1987. For the Nelson Mandela 70th Birthday Tribute on June 11, 1988, she performed the song live in an eight-song set. For her 1990 and 1991 Yokohama Arena concerts that were broadcast on Japanese television, she performed the song live. It was also performed live in Spain for her ABC-TV special, This Is My Life in 1992 and the Whitney: The Concert for a New South Africa HBO-TV concert special in November 1994. It was also performed live at the Whitney: Brunei The Royal Wedding Celebration concert in 1996.

== Legacy ==
=== Awards and accolades ===
At the Garden State Music Awards in 1988 held at Atlantic City, New Jersey, the song won two trophies in the rock/pop and R&B/dance categories.

The song was ranked sixth on the Billboard Hot 100 year-end charts as well as the fourth best-selling song on the Billboard Hot Dance Club Play year-end charts (1988). It was ranked 46th place in the Hot Black Singles year-end list that same year.

=== Polls and rankings ===
Since its release, the song has made several of best-of songs lists in relation to Houston.

Bill Lamb of About.com ranked it as the 10th best Houston song. In another Houston-related list, Steve Peake of the same site called the song a "genuine pop classic". In another Peake list of the "Top 10 Songs of the 1980s", "So Emotional" was ranked 7th place with Peake writing that the song "represents her best blend of danceable beats and an irrepressible chorus", adding that it "is a celebration of an '80s pluckiness we're not likely to see again, and it's so infectious that even a lot of rock fans found themselves subject to its seduction."

Slant ranked it as the tenth best Houston song on their list, writing that the song was "animated not by its scorched-cheese electric guitars, but by Whitney’s elated performance" and that the song's catchphrase, "I get so emotional, baby", was "so nebulous as to say absolutely nothing at all. Passion transcends words, of course, and Whitney’s ecstasy practically verges on religious."

Entertainment Weekly ranked it sixth in their best Houston songs list, saying the song "illuminated a naughtier, more rollicking side of the sweet-faced starlet."

BET ranked the rocker the tenth best song among 40 of Houston's songs, comparing it to Michael Jackson's "rock-soul mashups".

The A.V. Club ranked it as the "sixth most essential" Houston song (that wasn't "I Will Always Love You"), comparing the "lovelorn" track to similar songs by Robyn and FKA Twigs, writing that the song was like many of Houston's songs that was "rooted in themes of overpowering love and breathless excitement". It further stated that her look in the music video of her belting while "spinning in a leather jacket" was comparable to Gene Kelly "elucidat[ing] that 'glorious feeling' of singin’ in the rain."

American Songwriter included the song as one of the top ten best Whitney Houston songs.

MTV included the song among Houston's ten best songs ever.

The site TV80s wrote that the song "showcased her unmatched ability to channel raw feeling into radio-ready perfection."

=== Uses in popular culture and covers ===
In the music video for Childish Gambino's 2018 promo single "Feels Like Summer", Houston is depicted in animated form, appearing along with several other famous and iconic figures/people. Her look is based on the cover for the 1987 single.

In season 9 of RuPaul's Drag Race, Sasha Velour gave a memorable performance of the song during the show's lip sync battle between her and Shea Coulee in which she removed her wig to reveal a series of rose petals falling out of her head, resulting in her winning the competition. Allison Shoemaker of The A.V. Club named Velour's lipsync to "So Emotional" as the best TV performance of 2017.

In a 2022 CNN article on Houston's influence on gay culture, Velour explained that her performance of the song was her way of [capturing] the feeling of isolation, among other things, telling them "I saw the rose petals as a kind of iconography or metaphor... Loneliness, heartache, love, loss, grieving – I can hear different colors of all of that in 'So Emotional.' I wanted to take something broad like that, and just show how it builds and builds as her (Houston’s) performance gets more intense."

Following Velour's performance of the song, streams of "So Emotional" on Spotify increased by 650%.

In S1 E2-E3 of the 2020 Netflix show Julie and the Phantoms, the character Alex Mercer (Owen Joyner) wears a "So Emotional" t-shirt. This is a play on his character being the emotional, sensitive one of the group. They were not allowed to use Whitney Houston's image.

The poster for the 2022 biopic Whitney Houston: I Wanna Dance with Somebody, was revealed with actress Naomi Ackie depicted as Houston in her “So Emotional” look. Much like the single cover/video Ackie is donning a leather jacket, tank top, jeans & boots with socks.

The song has also been covered and sampled numerous times according to WhoSampled, most notably in songs such as "Daddy" by Beyoncé on her 2003 solo debut album, Dangerously in Love.

For the Glee Houston tribute episode, "Dance with Somebody" in 2012, the song was covered by Naya Rivera and Lea Michele.

Pop-rock musician Jon McLaughlin recorded a ballad version of the song and released it as a single in 2019.

In 2023, singer Claire Richards covered the song in a dance and house-styled production for the album, Euphoria.

== Track listings and formats ==
- US, 7" vinyl single
1. "So Emotional" – 4:36
2. "For the Love of You" – 4:29
- UK, 7" vinyl single
1. "So Emotional" (Edited remix) – 4:20
2. "For the Love of You" – 4:32
- UK, CD maxi-single
1. "So Emotional" (Extended remix) – 7:51
2. "Didn't We Almost Have It All" (Live) – 6:28
3. "For the Love of You" – 4:32

== Personnel ==
- Narada Michael Walden – drums
- Walter "Baby Love" Afanasieff – keyboards and synth bass
- Corrado Rustici – guitar synth
- Robert "Bongo Bob" Smith – drum sampling and percussion programming
- Background vocals – Whitney Houston
- Produced and arranged by Narada Michael Walden
- Recorded and mixed by David Frazer
- Assistant engineer – Dana Jon Chappelle
- Additional engineers – Lincoln Clapp, Gordon Lyon, Jay Rifkin, Ken Kessie, Maureen Droney
- Additional assistant engineers – Gordon Lyon, Stuart Hirotsu, Paul "Goatee" Hamingson, Noah Baron, Bill "Sweet William" Miranda, Ross Williams, Rob Beaton

== Charts and certifications ==
=== Weekly charts ===
Chart (1987–1988)	Peak position
Australia (Kent Music Report)	26
Belgium (Ultratop 50 Flanders)	18
Canada Top Singles (RPM)	9
Canada Retail Singles (The Record)	12
European Hot 100 Singles (Music & Media)	20
Finland (Suomen virallinen lista)	9
France (SNEP)	21
Ireland (IRMA)	3
Luxembourg (Radio Luxembourg)	1
Netherlands (Dutch Top 40)	23
Netherlands (Single Top 100)	18
New Zealand (Recorded Music NZ)	47
Quebec (ADISQ)	7
South Africa (Springbok)	20
Spain (AFYVE)	15
Switzerland (Schweizer Hitparade)	30
UK Singles (Official Charts)	5
US Billboard Hot 100	1
US Hot R&B/Hip-Hop Songs (Billboard)	5
US Billboard Crossover Top 30	1
US Adult Contemporary (Billboard)	8
US Dance Club Songs (Billboard) Remix	1
US Cashbox Top 100	4
US Cashbox Black Contemporary Singles	6

=== Year-end charts ===
Chart (1988)	Position
US Top Pop Singles (Billboard)	6
US Top Black Singles (Billboard)	46
US Top Dance Club Play Singles (Billboard) Remix	4
US Top Hot Crossover Singles (Billboard)	12

=== Certifications ===
Region	Certification	Certified units/sales
United States (RIAA)	Platinum	1,000,000^{‡}
^{‡} Sales+streaming figures based on certification alone.

== See also ==
- List of Hot 100 number-one singles of 1988 (U.S.)
- List of number-one dance singles of 1987 (U.S.)
- List of number-one dance singles of 1988 (U.S.)
- Billboard Year-End Hot 100 singles of 1988
