= Dirty Diana =

Single by Michael Jackson

from the album Bad
- B-side: "Bad" (extended dance mix)
- Released: April 18, 1988
- Recorded: 1986–1987
- Studio: Westlake (studio D), Los Angeles
- Genre: Pop rock; hard rock; glam metal
- Length: 4:52 (album version); 4:40 (single edit)
- Label: Epic
- Songwriter: Michael Jackson
- Producers: Quincy Jones; Michael Jackson (co.)

Michael Jackson singles chronology
"Man in the Mirror" (1988)	"Dirty Diana" (1988)	"Get It" (1988)

Music video
- "Dirty Diana" on YouTube

Audio sample
- "Dirty Diana": file; help

"Dirty Diana" is a song by American singer-songwriter Michael Jackson. It is the ninth track on Jackson's seventh studio album, Bad (1987). The song was released by Epic Records on April 18, 1988, as the fifth single from the album. It presents a harder rock sound similar to "Beat It" from Thriller (1982) and a guitar solo played by Steve Stevens. "Dirty Diana" was written and co-produced by Jackson, and produced by Quincy Jones. The song's lyrics pertain to groupies.

"Dirty Diana" received mixed reviews from contemporary music critics, but was a commercial success worldwide in 1988, charting at No. 1 on the United States Billboard Hot 100. The song also charted within the top ten in multiple countries, including the United Kingdom, France, Italy, and New Zealand. In 2009, after Jackson's death in June, the song re-entered charts, mainly due to digital download sales. A music video for "Dirty Diana" was filmed in front of a live audience and released in 1988.

== Background ==
"Dirty Diana" was written by Michael Jackson, and produced by Jackson and Quincy Jones. It appeared on Jackson's seventh studio album, Bad. The song was released by Epic Records on April 18, 1988, as the fifth single from Bad. After "Beat It", "Dirty Diana" was the second hard rock song of his solo career with lyrics about a persistent groupie. Jackson hired Billy Idol's guitarist Steve Stevens to back him on the track.

Initial reports at the time suggested the song was a poke at his close friend Diana Ross, but this was later denied. In fact, Ross started using the song as an overture at her concerts shortly before appearing on stage. In an interview from the special edition of Bad, Jones later confirmed that the song's lyrics were about groupies. Jackson also confirmed the same during an interview with Barbara Walters, adding that it was not about Diana, Princess of Wales, though he was told personally by the Princess that it was her favorite from amongst his songs.

== Composition ==
"Dirty Diana" has been described as a pop rock, hard rock and glam metal song similar to "Beat It", with elements of heavy metal. TriniTrent of The Lava Lizard, when talking about Michael and Janet Jackson's duet "Scream", mentions "Dirty Diana" as exemplifying the "pop/rock musical direction" that he has previously experimented with. John Tatlock of The Quietus regards the song as an attempt to recreate "the pop-rock alchemy of 'Beat It'." In his Bad review, Richard Cromelin of Los Angeles Times wrote that "'Dirty Diana' is trying to be this year's 'Beat It' — a hard-rock song about a tenacious groupie that's sent into orbit by a Steve Stevens guitar solo," while Tom Breihan of Stereogum's called it a "grimy hair-metal ire not that far removed from Appetite For Destruction."

Jon Pareles, a writer for The New York Times, viewed "Dirty Diana" as a song about a "groupie who latches onto the narrator, mixes the sexual fears of 'Billie Jean' with the hard-rock lead guitar of 'Beat It'." In his Bad review, Thom Duffy, music critic for the Orlando Sentinel, wrote that "Dirty Diana, a tale of a maliciously seductive fan, finds Jackson doing credible heavy-metal rock wailing," which, the critic said, was "accompanied by a solo from Steve Stevens, the guitarist from Billy Idol's band." Jonathan Takiff of The Philadelphia Inquirer also noted elements of heavy metal in "Dirty Diana", writing, "Plus, to tap the rock crowd (in the style of the 'Thriller' crossover smash 'Beat It' with Eddie Van Halen), Michael cut a heavy metal-tinged 'Dirty Diana' featuring Billy Idol's guitar sizzler Stevie [sic] Stevens." "Dirty Diana" is written in common time and moves at a moderate tempo of 131 beats per minute. Jackson's vocals are sung on a range of B♭_{3} to G_{5}. The instrumentation consists of guitar and piano and is played in the key of G minor.

== Reception ==
=== Critical response ===
"Dirty Diana" received mixed reviews from contemporary music critics. Stephen Thomas Erlewine felt that "Dirty Diana" and "Man in the Mirror" were "showcasing Jackson at his worst" on Bad. Music critic Robert Christgau viewed "Dirty Diana" as "misogynistic as any piece of metal suck-my-cock." Jon Pareles described "Dirty Diana" as 'reducing' Jackson to a "terrified whimper," while John Tatlock considered "Dirty Diana" as a "confused lumbering slog of a song," thinking that "Jackson was never convincing in this kind of role, a boy-child trying to write a song about the kind of woman he never meets in the kind of places he's certainly never been to." Davitt Sigerson of Rolling Stone gave the song a more positive review; though calling it a "filler," she still commented that the song, along with "Speed Demon", is what makes Bad "richer, sexier, better than Thriller's forgettables." Sigerson noted that "Dirty Diana" was a "substantial recording" because of its "insubstantial melody." Jennifer Clay of Yahoo! Music commented that while Jackson's edgier image was a "little hard to swallow," the image, musically, worked on the songs "Bad", "Man in the Mirror", and "Dirty Diana", but was not "to the degree of Thriller."

=== Chart performance ===
"Dirty Diana", similar to Bad's previous singles, charted within the top 20 and top 10 worldwide. It peaked at No. 1 on the United States Billboard Hot 100 on July 2, 1988, after nine weeks on the chart, and exited the chart after its 14th week. The song reached the number-one position on the Billboard Hot 100 on July 2, 1988. The song became Jackson's tenth number-one single on the Billboard Hot 100 chart, and his fifth consecutive number-one single. Jackson became the first male and artist in history of Billboard to take five singles from the same album to number one on the Billboard Hot 100, the record tied by Katy Perry in August 2011. Internationally, "Dirty Diana" charted within the top 30 positions on several music charts. It charted within the top five in the Netherlands, West Germany, and New Zealand, peaking at Nos. 2, 3 and 5, respectively. It entered the United Kingdom charts on July 16, 1988, at No. 14 and the following week went to No. 4, where it stayed for two weeks.

"Dirty Diana" peaked at No. 3 in Ireland, No. 7 in Austria and No. 9 in France. It peaked at No. 30 in Australia. Following Jackson's death in June 2009, his music experienced a surge in popularity. In July 2009, "Dirty Diana" saw a strong chart surge, mainly due to digital download sales. The song charted at No. 18 on the French Digital Singles Chart on July 4, 2009. On July 12, the song peaked at No. 13 on the Swiss Singles Chart. "Dirty Diana" re-entered the United Kingdom charts on July 4, 2009, at No. 50 and the following week peaked at No. 26.

== Music video ==
The five-minute music video for the song was directed by Joe Pytka and produced by Angela Jones. The music video was filmed in March 1988 in Long Beach, California. It won the "Number-One Video in the World" at the first World Music Awards held on April 14, 1989. It is featured on the DVD albums Number Ones, Michael Jackson's Vision, and the Target version DVD of Bad 25.

The woman who appears in the video is model Lisa Dean (1959–2009), chosen over hundreds of girls who auditioned for the role.

=== Live performance video ===
A second seven-minute long accompanying video of a live performance was filmed in early 1988 in front of a live audience during Jackson's show in Madison Square Garden (Steve Stevens playing guitar). The video starts with the screen saying "Pepsi Presents Michael Jackson Tour 1988" in front of a white background for forty seconds. After showing a black screen, Jackson can be seen from a distance performing in front of an audience with the only source of light being blue lights. During Jackson's performance he is dressed in a white button down shirt, black pants and has metal and leather belts on his pants while singing and dancing. In between Jackson's performance from a distance, there are clips of him performing up-close while singing into a microphone, as well as clips of his guitarist Jennifer Batten performing behind him. Jackson then begins dancing and singing to the woman before walking down a cat-walk and dancing near guitarist Steve Stevens. Jackson's performance is then shown from a distance again and the video ends with Jackson finishing his performance and the lights turning blue.

== Live performances ==
"Dirty Diana" was performed during Jackson's Bad World Tour concert series from 1987 to 1989, but only in the second leg, as the 10th song in the setlist. According to Jackson in an interview with Barbara Walters, "Dirty Diana" was scheduled for a live 1988 performance at Wembley Stadium during the Bad World Tour; however, Jackson felt the song would be an insult to Diana, Princess of Wales, who was in attendance, so he had it removed. After Diana informed him the song was actually one of her personal favorites, Jackson re-added the song to the set list. This performance can be seen on the DVD Michael Jackson: Live at Wembley July 16, 1988. This Is It concert series choreographer, Kenny Ortega, stated in an interview that "Dirty Diana" was going to be performed by Jackson for the concerts from 2009 to 2010. Ortega said that Jackson had planned to rehearse the song before he passed. The set up for the song would include an expert pole dancer who would lure Jackson onto a giant steel bed on which she performed acrobatic feats.

== Track listing ==
- 7-inch single, 12-inch maxi
1. "Dirty Diana" – 4:42
2. "Dirty Diana" (instrumental) – 4:42
- 3-inch CD single
1. "Dirty Diana" (single edit) – 4:42
2. "Dirty Diana" (record version) 4:42
3. "Dirty Diana" (album version) – 4:52
- CD-maxi single
1. "Dirty Diana" – 4:42
2. "Dirty Diana" (instrumental) – 4:42
3. "Bad" (dance extended mix includes false fade) – 8:24
- CD side
1. "Dirty Diana" – 4:40
2. "Dirty Diana" (instrumental) – 4:40
- DVD side
1. "Dirty Diana" (music video) – 5:08

== Credits and personnel ==
- Written and composed by Michael Jackson
- Produced by Quincy Jones
- Co-produced by Michael Jackson
- Rhythm arrangement by Michael Jackson, John Barnes and Jerry Hey
- Synthesizer arrangements by Michael Jackson, Quincy Jones and John Barnes
- String arrangement by John Barnes
- Vocal arrangement by Michael Jackson
- Michael Jackson – solo and background vocals, Clave' clapstick
- Steve Stevens – guitar solo
- Paul Jackson, Jr. - lead guitar
- David Williams – rhythm guitar
- Christopher Currell – Synclavier
- Denny Jaeger – Synclavier synthesis
- John Barnes, Michael Boddicker and Randy Waldman – synthesizers
- John Robinson – drums
- Douglas Getschal – drum programming

== Charts ==
=== Weekly charts ===
1988 weekly chart performance for "Dirty Diana"
Chart (1988–1989)	Peak position
Australia (ARIA)	30
Austria (Ö3 Austria Top 40)	7
Belgium (Ultratop 50 Flanders)	1
Canada Adult Contemporary (RPM)	14
Canada Top Singles (RPM)	5
Europe (Eurochart Hot 100)	1
Finland (Suomen virallinen singlelista)	15
France (SNEP)	9
Ireland (IRMA)	3
Italy (Musica e Dischi)	18
Italy Airplay (Music & Media)	16
Netherlands (Dutch Top 40)	2
Netherlands (Single Top 100)	2
New Zealand (Recorded Music NZ)	5
Switzerland (Schweizer Hitparade)	3
UK Singles (Official Charts)	4
US Billboard Hot 100	1
US Hot Black Singles (Billboard)	8
US Cash Box Top 100	1
West Germany (GfK)	3

2006 weekly chart performance for "Dirty Diana"
Chart (2006)	Peak position
Australia (Kent Music Report)	60
France (SNEP)	62
Ireland (IRMA)	20
Italy (FIMI)	6
Netherlands (Single Top 100)	22
Spain (Promusicae)	1
UK Singles (Official Charts)	17
UK Hip Hop/R&B (Official Charts)	4

2009 weekly chart performance for "Dirty Diana"
Chart (2009)	Peak position
Austria (Ö3 Austria Top 40)	22
Belgium (Back Catalogue Singles Flanders)	6
Canada (Hot Canadian Digital Singles)	60
Denmark (Tracklisten)	5
France Download (SNEP)	18
Netherlands (Single Top 100)	23
Norway (VG-lista)	17
Sweden (Sverigetopplistan)	29
Switzerland (Schweizer Hitparade)	13
UK Singles (Official Charts)	26
US Hot Digital Songs (Billboard)	32

2026 weekly chart performance for "Dirty Diana"
Chart (2026)	Peak position
France (SNEP)	62
Global 200 (Billboard)	34
Greece International (IFPI)	12
Romania (Billboard)	21
Russia Streaming (TopHit)	90
UK Hip Hop/R&B (Official Charts)	3

=== Year-end charts ===
Year-end chart performance for "Dirty Diana"
Chart (1988)	Position
Austria (Ö3 Austria Top 40)	9
Belgium (Ultratop 50 Flanders)	9
France (SNEP)	52
Netherlands (Dutch Top 40)	33
Netherlands (Single Top 100)	31
Switzerland (Schweizer Hitparade)	6
US Billboard Hot 100	61
US Hot Black Singles (Billboard)	98
US Cash Box Top 100	18
West Germany (Media Control)	15

== Certifications ==
Certifications and sales for "Dirty Diana"
Region	Certification	Certified units/sales
Canada (Music Canada)	Platinum	80,000^{‡}
Denmark (IFPI Danmark)	Platinum	90,000^{‡}
Germany (BVMI)	Gold	300,000^{‡}
Mexico (AMPROFON)	2× Platinum	120,000^{‡}
New Zealand (RMNZ)	Platinum	30,000^{‡}
United Kingdom (BPI)	2× Platinum	1,200,000^{‡}
United States (RIAA)	Platinum	1,000,000^{‡}
Streaming
Greece (IFPI Greece)	Gold	1,000,000^{†}
^{‡} Sales+streaming figures based on certification alone.^{†} Streaming-only figures based on certification alone.

== Other versions ==
For the mixtape Echoes of Silence, Canadian singer-songwriter the Weeknd released in 2011 an Illangelo-produced cover version of the song, simply initialized as "D.D.". In 2019, American rapper YoungBoy Never Broke Again released the song "Dirty Iyanna", which is a re-work of the original "Dirty Diana" but with altered lyrics and a typical trap beat, as well as serving as a diss track aimed at Floyd Mayweather, Jr.'s daughter, Iyanna Mayweather, YoungBoy's ex-girlfriend at the time of its release.

== See also ==
- List of Billboard Hot 100 number-one singles of 1988
- List of Cash Box Top 100 number-one singles of 1988
- List of European number-one hits of 1988
- List of number-one hits of 1988 (Flanders)
- List of number-one singles of 2006 (Spain)

== Bibliography ==
- Halstead, Craig; Cadman, Chris (2003). Michael Jackson the Solo Years. Authors OnLine. ISBN 978-0-7552-0091-7.
- Halstead, Craig; Cadman, Chris (2007). Michael Jackson: For the Record. Authors OnLine. ISBN 978-0-7552-0267-6.
- Jones, Jel D. Lewis (2005). Michael Jackson, The King of Pop: The Big Picture : The Music! The Man! The Legend! The Interviews : An Anthology. Amber Books Publishing. ISBN 978-0-9749779-0-4.
