= Learning to Live (Without Your Love) =

Single by O'Chi Brown and Rick Astley

from the album O'Chi
- B-side: "Another Broken Heart"
- Released: October 1987
- Recorded: 1986
- Genre: Dance-pop
- Length: 3:29
- Label: Magnet Records
- Songwriters: Stock Aitken Waterman; O'Chi Brown
- Producers: Stock Aitken Waterman; Tony Moore; Mel Simpson

Rick Astley singles chronology
| "Never Gonna Give You Up" (1987) | "Learning to Live (Without Your Love)" (1987) | "Whenever You Need Somebody" (1987) |

"Learning to Live (Without Your Love)" is a song by English singers Rick Astley and O'Chi Brown. The song was originally released in 1986 as an album track on Brown's album O'Chi. Astley was uncredited on the album and received no royalties. When Rick Astley achieved worldwide success with his 1987 debut single "Never Gonna Give You Up", Magnetic Records released the song as a single in October 1987 to cash-in on his success. The song however failed to chart in the UK Singles Chart. The two singers never met, and Brown first heard Astley's vocal when she was given a copy of her album.

== Official versions ==
"Learning to Live (Without Your Love)"

- 7″ – 3:29
- 12″ – 4:50

"Another Broken Heart"

- 7″ – 3:36
- Remix – 6:05
- Album Version – 5:46
