= Tear Down These Walls =

1988 studio album by Billy Ocean

Studio album by Billy Ocean
- Released: 7 March 1988
- Recorded: 1987
- Studios: Battery Studios (London, UK); East Bay Studios (Tarrytown, New York); Sigma Sound Studios, Soundtrack Studios and Mediasound Studios (New York City, New York)
- Genres: R&B; pop; dance-pop; soul; electronic
- Length: 46:57
- Label: Jive
- Producers: Barry Eastmond; Wayne Brathwaite; Robert John "Mutt" Lange

Billy Ocean chronology
Love Zone (1986)	Tear Down These Walls (1988)	Greatest Hits (1989)

Singles from Tear Down These Walls
- 1. "Get Outta My Dreams, Get into My Car" Released: January 1988; 2. "Calypso Crazy" Released: April 1988; 3. "The Colour of Love" Released: May 1988; 4. "Tear Down These Walls" Released: August 1988; 5. "Stand and Deliver" Released: October 1988

Professional ratings
Review scores
Source	Rating
AllMusic	3/5 stars
Record Mirror	3/5 stars

Tear Down These Walls is the seventh studio album by the British singer Billy Ocean, released in March 1988 by Jive Records as the follow-up to Ocean's critically and commercially successful 1986 album Love Zone.

== Background ==
The album's title is a reference to then-President Ronald Reagan's "tear down this wall!" speech. It features guest backing vocals from artists including the Manhattans, Will Downing, Carroll Thompson, and Mary Cassidy, and is generally regarded as the culmination of the smoother, more adult-oriented sound of Ocean's later work.

One of Ocean's most commercially successful studio albums, it went on to peak at number 3 on the UK Albums Chart and reached number 18 on the US Billboard 200. The album launched four charting singles in the UK: "Get Outta My Dreams, Get into My Car" peaked at number 3 on the UK Singles Chart; "Calypso Crazy" peaked at 35; "The Colour of Love" at 65 and "Stand and Deliver" at 97.

"Get Outta My Dreams, Get into My Car" was Ocean's third and final number-one hit on the Billboard Hot 100 chart, and his fourth and final number-one R&B hit in that country. The song topped pop charts in several other countries, including Australia, Belgium, Canada, Ireland, the Netherlands, and Norway. "The Colour of Love" was a top 20 pop hit in the US and Canada, and Ocean's tenth and final top-10 hit on the US R&B chart.

Tear Down These Walls was released in 39 versions, including a unique Mini CD version (three 3" CDs) for the UK.

The album was re-released on 16 June 2014 on Cherry Pop featuring rare bonus content. The reissue is a two-CD set with the original album digitally remastered from the original 1/2″ mix tapes; the bonus content consists of associated 7″ and 12″ mixes.

== Critical reception ==
On release, the album received generally favourable reviews by music critics. In a retrospective review for AllMusic, critic Ron Wynn gave the album three out of five stars and wrote that "While he was still a successful attraction, this album wouldn't reach the multi-platinum levels of its predecessors." also noting that "Ocean's voice also lacked the resonance and authority it had on earlier dance tunes and wasn't as convincing or confident on ballads."

== Track listing ==
All tracks are written by Wayne Braithwaite, Barry Eastmond, Billy Ocean and Jolyon Skinner, except where noted.

Side one
No.	Title	Writer(s)	Length
1.	"Tear Down These Walls"	Robert Lange; Billy Ocean; Teddy Riley	3:41
2.	"Gun for Hire"		4:59
3.	"Stand and Deliver"		5:02
4.	"The Colour of Love"		4:26
5.	"Calypso Crazy"	Lange; Ocean	4:55

Side two
No.	Title	Writer(s)	Length
6.	"Get Outta My Dreams, Get into My Car"	Lange; Ocean	5:37
7.	"Soon as You're Ready"		4:38
8.	"Pleasure"		4:55
9.	"Because of You"		4:53
10.	"Here's to You"		4:14
Total length:			46:57

Bonus tracks on 2014 reissue
No.	Title	Writer(s)	Length
11.	"Get Outta My Dreams, Get into My Car" (extended version)	Lange; Ocean	9:01
12.	"Showdown"		5:00
13.	"Calypso Crazy" (extended version)	Lange; Ocean	5:53
14.	"Let's Get Back Together"		4:42
15.	"Stand & Deliver" (extended version)		6:57

== Personnel ==
Credits are adapted from the album's liner notes.

Musicians

- Billy Ocean – vocals
- David Collard, Barry Eastmond, Mitchel Forman, Rob Lord, Phil Nicholas, Eric Rehl, Teddy Riley and V. Jeffrey Smith – keyboards, synthesizers
- Pete Q. Harris and Phil Nicholas – Fairlight programming
- Jonathan Butler, Steve Byrd, Mike Campbell, Vic Linton and Ira Siegel – guitars
- Wayne Braithwaite, Paul Bruce and Jolyon Skinner – bass
- Richard Bailey, Terry Silverlight and Buddy Williams – drums
- Bashiri Johnson and Tony Maronie – percussion
- Charles Dougherty, Wesley Magoogan, Lenny Pickett and V. Jeffrey Smith – saxophones
- Clifton Anderson – trombone
- Mac Gollehon and Ron Tooley – trumpet
- Richard Hendrickson and Edith Wint – cello

Background vocals

- The Manhattans – backing vocals (1)
- Phillip Ballou, Ethel Beatty, Mary Cassidy, Will Downing, Lani Groves, Yolanda Lee Lewis, Cindy Mizelle, B.J. Nelson, Vaneese Thomas, Carroll Thompson, Bernita Turner and Andrey Wheeler – backing vocals

=== Production ===
- Robert John "Mutt" Lange – producer (1, 5, 6), arrangements (1)
- Teddy Riley – arrangements (1)
- Barry J. Eastmond – producer (2–4, 7–10)
- Wayne Braithwaite – producer (2–4, 7–10)
- Jerry Peal – engineer
- Carl Beatty – additional engineer
- Steve Power – additional engineer
- Bruce Robbins – assistant engineer
- Chris Trevitt – assistant engineer
- Nigel Green – mixing (1–7, 10)
- Bryan "Chuck" New – mixing (8, 9)
- Zombart (Jonathan Elliot and Ben Wilson) – sleeve design
- Iain McKell – photography
- Ben at Mr. Alex – hair stylist
- Laurie Jay with LJE Ltd. – management
- Jim Phelan – additional design, layout (2014 remastered release)
- Michael Silvester – liner notes (2014 remastered release)

== Charts ==
=== Weekly charts ===
Weekly chart performance for Tear Down These Walls
Chart (1988)	Peak position
Australian Albums (Australian Music Report)	13
Austrian Albums (Ö3 Austria)	28
Canada Top Albums/CDs (RPM)	8
Dutch Albums (Album Top 100)	18
European Albums (Music & Media)	13
Finnish Albums (Suomen virallinen lista)	20
German Albums (Offizielle Top 100)	17
New Zealand Albums (RMNZ)	7
Norwegian Albums (VG-lista)	3
Swedish Albums (Sverigetopplistan)	14
Swiss Albums (Schweizer Hitparade)	10
UK Albums (Official Charts)	3
US Billboard 200	18
US Top R&B/Hip-Hop Albums (Billboard)	7

=== Year-end chart ===
Year-end chart performance for Tear Down These Walls
Chart (1988)	Position
Canada Top Albums/CDs (RPM)	32
European Albums (Music & Media)	88
US Billboard 200	63
US Top R&B/Hip-Hop Albums (Billboard)	30

== Certifications and sales ==
Certifications and sales for Tear Down These Walls
Region	Certification	Certified units/sales
Australia (ARIA)	Gold	35,000^{^}
Canada (Music Canada)	Platinum	100,000^{^}
United Kingdom (BPI)	Gold	100,000^{^}
United States (RIAA)	Platinum	700,000
^{^} Shipments figures based on certification alone.
