= Calypso Crazy =

Single by Billy Ocean

from the album Tear Down These Walls
- B-side: "Let's Get Back Together"
- Released: 25 April 1988
- Studio: Battery Studios (London)
- Length: 4:55
- Label: Jive
- Songwriters: Billy Ocean; Robert John "Mutt" Lange
- Producer: Robert John "Mutt" Lange

Billy Ocean singles chronology
"Get Outta My Dreams, Get into My Car" (1988)	"Calypso Crazy" (1988)	"The Colour of Love" (1988)

Music video
- "Calypso Crazy" on YouTube

"Calypso Crazy" is a single by the British singer Billy Ocean. It is the second single from the singer's seventh studio album, Tear Down These Walls (1988). Following the successful chart performances of the Tear Down These Walls single "Get Outta My Dreams, Get into My Car", "Calypso Crazy" was released as the album's second single. It became his twelfth and final UK Top 40 hit to date.

The single was not released in the US, where "The Colour of Love" was released instead, peaking at #17. This would later be the album's third single in the UK, reaching #65.

== Track listing ==
- 12" single (BOS T 2)
1. "Calypso Crazy (Extended Version)"
2. "Calypso Crazy (7" Version)"
3. "Calypso Crazy (Instrumental Version)"
4. "Let's Get Back Together"
- 7" single (BOS 2)
1. "Calypso Crazy" - 4:26
2. "Let's Get Back Together" - 4:42

== Chart performance ==
Chart (1988)	Peak position
Belgium (Ultratop 50 Flanders)	18
Netherlands (Dutch Top 40)	38
New Zealand (Recorded Music NZ)	36
UK Singles (The Official Charts Company)	35
