= List of Billboard Hot 100 number ones of 1988 =

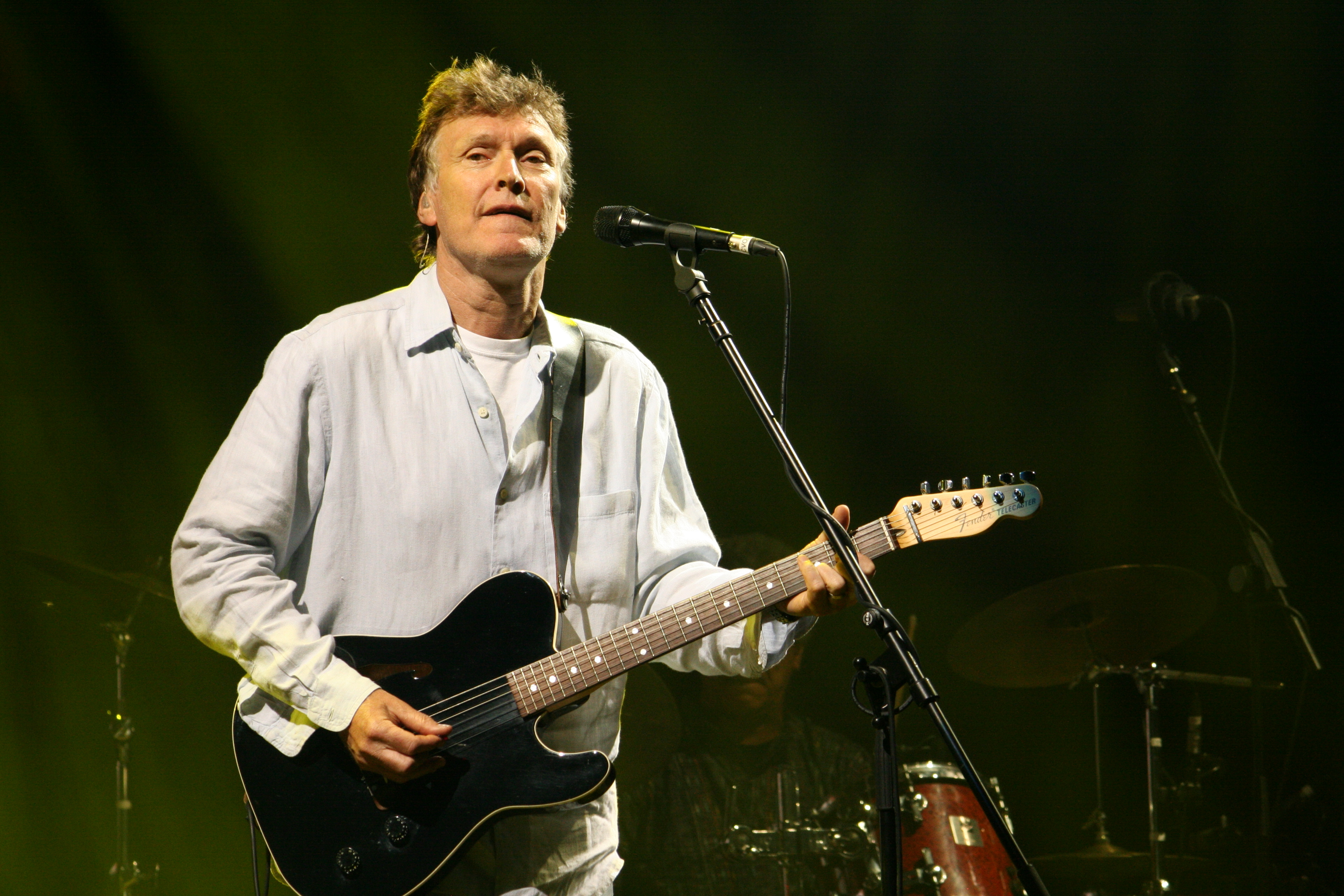
Steve Winwood (pictured) earned his second Hot 100 number-one single with "Roll With It", which stayed at the top position for four straight weeks.

These are the Billboard magazine Hot 100 number one hits of 1988. The Billboard Hot 100 is a chart that ranks the best-performing singles of the United States. Published by Billboard magazine, the data are based collectively on each single's weekly physical sales, and airplay. R&B/pop megastar Whitney Houston's two singles released from her second studio album Whitney, "So Emotional" and "Where Do Broken Hearts Go", both peaked at number one, which gave her a total of seven consecutive number one hits, breaking the record of six previously shared by The Beatles and The Bee Gees. The longest running number-one single of 1988 was "Roll With It" by Steve Winwood, which obtained four weeks at the top of the chart. When "Dirty Diana" reached number-one on the chart, it became Michael Jackson's fifth single from the album Bad to reach number-one. Jackson became the first artist to have five singles from one album reach number-one on the Billboard Hot 100 and is the only male to do so. George Michael's "Faith" was the best selling single of 1988 in the United States, despite most of its weeks at number one occurring in December 1987. (It carried over into 1988 at number one as the result of a frozen chart.) 1988 is tied with 1989 for the second most #1 hits with 32 songs going to number one.

That year, 17 acts earned their first number one song, such as INXS, Exposé, Rick Astley, Terence Trent D'Arby, Gloria Estefan, Miami Sound Machine, Debbie Gibson, Cheap Trick, Richard Marx, Guns N' Roses, Bobby McFerrin, Def Leppard, UB40, The Escape Club, Will to Power, Chicago and Poison. George Michael, Whitney Houston, Michael Jackson, and Rick Astley were the only acts to hit number one more than once, with George Michael having the most with four, Michael Jackson with three, and Whitney Houston and Rick Astley with two.

== Chart history ==
Key
The yellow background indicates the #1 song on Billboard's 1988 Year-End Chart of Pop Singles.

No.	Issue date	Song	Artist(s)	Ref.
646	January 2 (Note: This was an unpublished week, due to a special double issue that Billboard published in print the previous week, for the year-end charts, and covered two weeks; all Billboard weekly charts were "frozen" during the break.)	"Faith"	George Michael	
647	January 9	"So Emotional"	Whitney Houston	
648	January 16	"Got My Mind Set on You"	George Harrison	
649	January 23	"The Way You Make Me Feel"	Michael Jackson	
650	January 30	"Need You Tonight"	INXS	
651	February 6	"Could've Been"	Tiffany	
651	February 13	"Could've Been"	Tiffany	
652	February 20	"Seasons Change"	Exposé	
653	February 27	"Father Figure"	George Michael	
653	March 5	"Father Figure"	George Michael	
654	March 12	"Never Gonna Give You Up"	Rick Astley	
654	March 19	"Never Gonna Give You Up"	Rick Astley	
655	March 26	"Man in the Mirror"	Michael Jackson	
655	April 2	"Man in the Mirror"	Michael Jackson	
656	April 9	"Get Outta My Dreams, Get into My Car"	Billy Ocean	
656	April 16	"Get Outta My Dreams, Get into My Car"	Billy Ocean	
657	April 23	"Where Do Broken Hearts Go"	Whitney Houston	
657	April 30	"Where Do Broken Hearts Go"	Whitney Houston	
658	May 7	"Wishing Well"	Terence Trent D'Arby	
659	May 14	"Anything for You"	Gloria Estefan and Miami Sound Machine	
659	May 21	"Anything for You"	Gloria Estefan and Miami Sound Machine	
660	May 28	"One More Try"	George Michael	
660	June 4	"One More Try"	George Michael	
660	June 11	"One More Try"	George Michael	
661	June 18	"Together Forever"	Rick Astley	
662	June 25	"Foolish Beat"	Debbie Gibson	
663	July 2	"Dirty Diana"	Michael Jackson	
664	July 9	"The Flame"	Cheap Trick	
664	July 16	"The Flame"	Cheap Trick	
665	July 23	"Hold On to the Nights"	Richard Marx	
666	July 30	"Roll With It"	Steve Winwood	
666	August 6	"Roll With It"	Steve Winwood	
666	August 13	"Roll With It"	Steve Winwood	
666	August 20	"Roll With It"	Steve Winwood	
667	August 27	"Monkey"	George Michael	
667	September 3	"Monkey"	George Michael	
668	September 10	"Sweet Child o' Mine"	Guns N' Roses	
668	September 17	"Sweet Child o' Mine"	Guns N' Roses	
669	September 24	"Don't Worry, Be Happy"	Bobby McFerrin	
669	October 1	"Don't Worry, Be Happy"	Bobby McFerrin	
670	October 8	"Love Bites"	Def Leppard	
671	October 15	"Red Red Wine"	UB40	
672	October 22	"A Groovy Kind of Love"	Phil Collins	
672	October 29	"A Groovy Kind of Love"	Phil Collins	
673	November 5	"Kokomo"	The Beach Boys	
674	November 12	"Wild, Wild West"	The Escape Club	
675	November 19	"Bad Medicine"	Bon Jovi	
675	November 26	"Bad Medicine"	Bon Jovi	
676	December 3	"Baby, I Love Your Way/Freebird Medley"	Will to Power	
677	December 10	"Look Away"	Chicago	
677	December 17	"Look Away"	Chicago	
678	December 24	"Every Rose Has Its Thorn"	Poison	
678	December 31	"Every Rose Has Its Thorn"	Poison	

== Number-one artists ==
List of number-one artists by total weeks at number one
Position	Artist	Weeks at No. 1
1	George Michael	8
2	Michael Jackson	4
2	Steve Winwood	4
4	Whitney Houston	3
4	Rick Astley	3
6	Tiffany	2
6	Billy Ocean	2
6	Gloria Estefan and Miami Sound Machine	2
6	Cheap Trick	2
6	Guns N' Roses	2
6	Bobby McFerrin	2
6	Phil Collins	2
6	Bon Jovi	2
6	Chicago	2
6	Poison	2
16	George Harrison	1
16	INXS	1
16	Exposé	1
16	Terence Trent D'Arby	1
16	Debbie Gibson	1
16	Richard Marx	1
16	Def Leppard	1
16	UB40	1
16	The Beach Boys	1
16	The Escape Club	1
16	Will to Power	1

== See also ==
- 1988 in music
- List of Billboard number-one singles
- List of Billboard Hot 100 number-one singles of the 1980s

== Additional sources ==
- Fred Bronson's Billboard Book of Number 1 Hits, 5th Edition (ISBN 0-8230-7677-6)
- Joel Whitburn's Top Pop Singles 1955-2008, 12 Edition (ISBN 0-89820-180-2)
- Joel Whitburn Presents the Billboard Hot 100 Charts: The Eighties (ISBN 0-89820-079-2)
- Additional information obtained can be verified within Billboard's online archive services and print editions of the magazine.
