= Never Gonna Give You Up =

1987 single by Rick Astley

Single by Rick Astley

from the album Whenever You Need Somebody
- B-side: "Never Gonna Give You Up" (instrumental)
- Released: 27 July 1987
- Recorded: October 1986
- Genre: Dance-pop; synth-pop; blue-eyed soul; disco
- Length: 3:35 (album version); 3:32 (7" vocal mix); 3:30 (instrumental version)
- Label: RCA; PWL; BMG
- Songwriter: Stock Aitken Waterman
- Producer: Stock Aitken Waterman

Rick Astley singles chronology
"When You Gonna" (1987)	"Never Gonna Give You Up" (1987)	"Learning to Live (Without Your Love)" (1987)

Audio sample
- "Never Gonna Give You Up": file; help

Music video
- "Never Gonna Give You Up" on YouTube

"Never Gonna Give You Up" is a song by English singer Rick Astley, released on 27 July 1987. The song is widely regarded as Astley's most popular, as well as his signature song, and it is often played at the end of his live concerts. Written and produced by Stock Aitken Waterman, it was released by RCA Records as the first single from Astley's debut studio album, Whenever You Need Somebody (1987), with a music video directed by Simon West.

The song became a worldwide hit, initially in the United Kingdom in 1987, where it stayed at the top of the chart for five weeks and was the best-selling single of that year. It eventually topped charts in 25 different countries, including the US and West Germany, and winning Best British Single at the 1988 Brit Awards.

The video resurged in popularity in 2007 due to the bait-and-switch "Rickroll" internet meme. In 2008, Astley won the MTV Europe Music Award for Best Act Ever with the song, as a result of a collective campaign by thousands of people on the Internet. In 2019, Astley recorded and released a new "Pianoforte" arrangement of the song for his album The Best of Me. In 2023, Billboard magazine ranked "Never Gonna Give You Up" among the 500 best pop songs of all time.

== Production ==
"Never Gonna Give You Up" was recorded at PWL Studios in South London, England. The song's basslines were produced using a Yamaha DX7 digital synthesizer, while a Linn 9000 was used for the drums and sequencing. Other equipment used included a Roland Juno 106 analogue synthesiser, and Yamaha Rev5 and Rev7 reverberators.

Mike Stock stated that the Colonel Abrams hit "Trapped" (1985) was a big influence on "Never Gonna Give You Up", saying: "For Rick Astley's song I didn't want it to sound like Kylie or Bananarama so I looked at the Colonel Abrams track 'Trapped' and recreated that syncopated bassline in a way that suited our song."

The title and concept for the song were suggested by Pete Waterman after Astley spoke to him of his devotion to his then girlfriend, with the song's tune, chords and lyrics then composed by Mike Stock and Matt Aitken. Initial mixing was done by Phil Harding, with the song's distinctive synthetic string and brass lines later added by Fairlight operator Ian Curnow. The final mix was provided by PWL remixer Pete Hammond, who made the vocals more prominent. His completed extended mix was edited down by Stock and Aitken to become the radio version.

== Music video ==
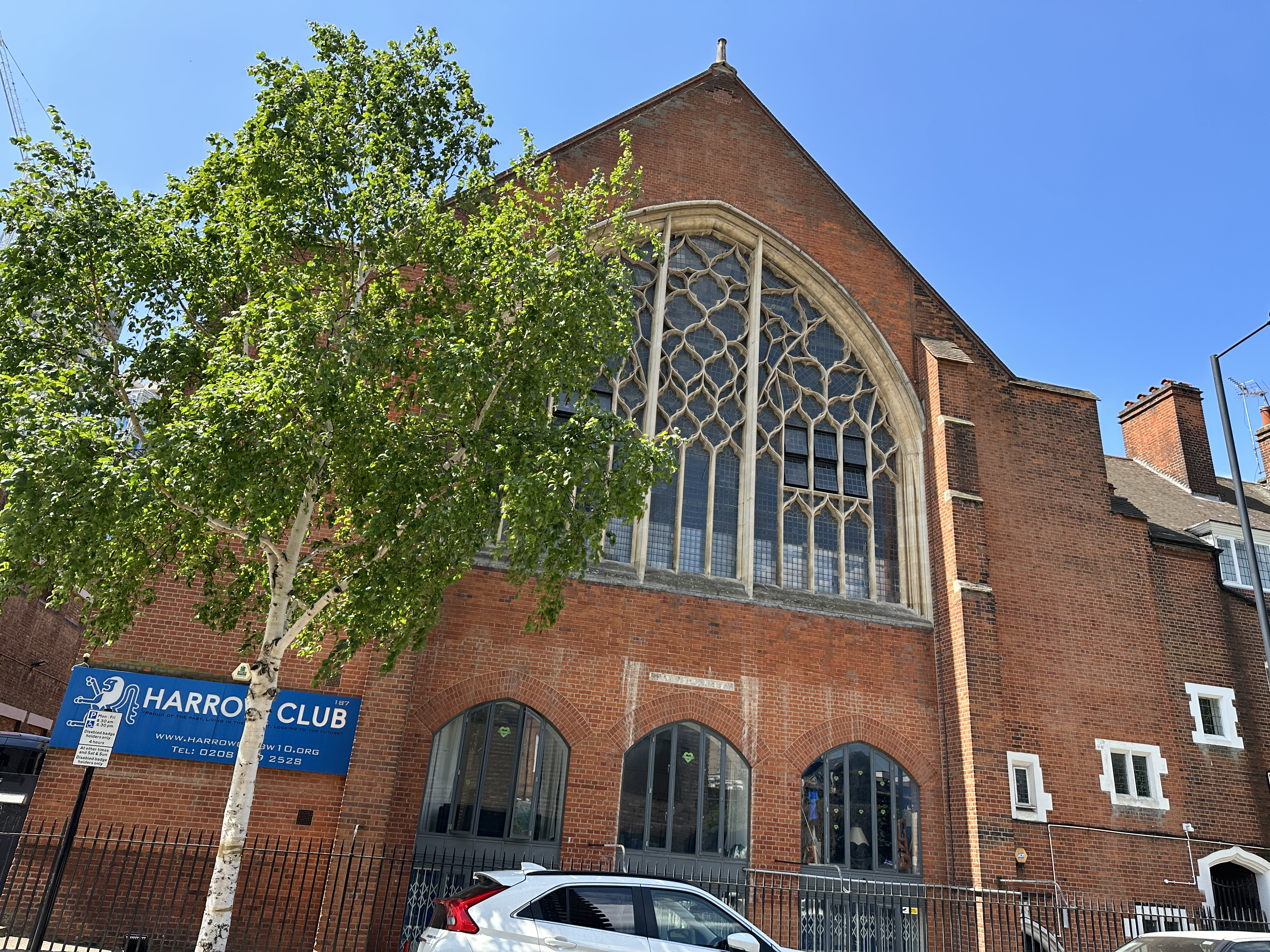
The Harrow Club served as a filming location

The music video for "Never Gonna Give You Up" was directed by Simon West. It was filmed in London, in the Harrow Club and on Freston Road in the London Borough of Kensington and Chelsea. Since being uploaded to YouTube on 25 October 2009, the video has received over 1.7 billion views and 18 million likes; it surpassed the 1 billion views milestone on 28 July 2021.

== Critical reception ==
A review in Pan-European magazine Music & Media presented "Never Gonna Give You Up" as a "carefree and cheerful pop ditty, sung with that youthful, muscular voice".

== Chart performance ==
For the week ending 12 March 1988, "Never Gonna Give You Up" reached number one on the American Billboard Hot 100 chart after having been played by resident DJ, Larry Levan, at the Paradise Garage in 1987. The single topped the charts in 25 countries worldwide. The single also reached the number 1 spot on the year-end singles charts in the UK and South Africa. With over one million sales in the UK, in 2023 it was included on the Official Charts Company's list of the UK's best-selling singles of all time at number 164.

== Legacy ==
The track was production trio Stock Aitken Waterman's biggest and most enduring hit. Composer Mike Stock confessed he struggled to completely understand why the song had struck such a chord, but suggested its massive success was down to a combination of the song, the singer, and the international clout of record label RCA.

The song was reportedly played as part of Operation Nifty Package, a psychological warfare campaign to convince Panamanian dictator Manuel Noriega to surrender during the United States invasion of Panama in 1989, along with other songs such as the Clash's cover of "I Fought the Law" and "Panama" by Van Halen. The Emmy Award-winning sitcom Ted Lasso featured the song prominently in the season two episode "No Weddings and a Funeral", including a scene where Rebecca Welton (played by Hannah Waddingham) begins to sing it in the middle of her father's funeral. Astley himself commented of the episode, "Waddingham...did an amazing, incredible job. It was so emotional, so moving, so incredible. People have said they even cried (during) the church scene."

Sometime after he resumed his career in 2016, Astley and the Foo Fighters both performed at the Summer Sonic Festival in Japan. The band invited Astley to join them as they performed the song in the style of "Smells Like Teen Spirit".

In August 2022, the CSAA Insurance Group, an insurer for the American Automobile Association, released a commercial featuring Rick Astley, with scenes recreated from the original "Never Gonna Give You Up" music video. Yung Gravy's 2022 song "Betty (Get Money)" prominently interpolates "Never Gonna Give You Up"'s synthesiser riff and chorus, with Stock Aitken Waterman credited as songwriters. Although Astley agreed to license the music and lyrics, he never authorised Gravy to directly copy his voice. On 26 January 2023, Astley filed a lawsuit in a Los Angeles court, objecting to Gravy's use of an impersonator to mimic Astley's voice. The case was settled in September 2023.

In 2014, Matt Dunn of WhatCulture ranked the song at number one in his "15 unforgettable Stock Aitken Waterman singles" list. Time Out listed "Never Gonna Give You Up" at number 33 in their "The 50 Best '80s Songs" list in 2018, adding, "Those synthesized strings, that thumping boots-and-pants beat, Astley's weirdly robust croon and his romantic-wooing-as-used-car-salesman pitch ('You wouldn't get this from any other guy')… It all adds up to three-and-a-half of the most effervescent minutes in the '80s canon." In April 2020, The Guardian ranked it at number 44 in their list of "The 100 Greatest UK No 1s". Classic Pop ranked the song number four in their list of "Top 40 Stock Aitken Waterman Songs" in 2021. In October 2023, Billboard magazine ranked "Never Gonna Give You Up" number 244 in their list of "500 Best Pop Songs of All Time". In 2023, Alexis Petridis of The Guardian listed the song at number two in his "Stock Aitken Waterman's 20 greatest songs – ranked!", describing it "a brilliantly written song". In 2025, Thomas Edward of Smooth Radio ranked the song number two in his list of "Stock Aitken Waterman's 15 greatest songs, ranked", and number one in his list of "Rick Astley's 10 greatest songs, ever".

=== Rickrolling ===
A screenshot of the music video for the song on YouTube in 2009. People use the music video to Rickroll others.

"Never Gonna Give You Up" is the subject of an Internet meme known as "rickrolling" involving misleading links (commonly shortened URLs) redirecting to the song's music video. Started by users on 4chan, the practice had by May 2007 achieved notoriety on the Internet. It increased in popularity after its use as a 2008 April Fools' Day joke by various media companies and websites—including YouTube, which rickrolled all of its featured videos on that day—allowing people to easily rickroll their friends' devices. "I think it's just one of those odd things where something gets picked up and people run with it", Astley told the Los Angeles Times in late March 2008. "That's what's brilliant about the Internet."

Astley appeared in the 2008 Macy's Thanksgiving Day Parade, interrupting a song performed by those on a float promoting the Cartoon Network programme Foster's Home for Imaginary Friends with a lipsynched performance of "Never Gonna Give You Up". There were reports that despite the video garnering millions of hits on YouTube, Astley earned almost no money from the online phenomenon, receiving only $12 in royalties from YouTube for his performance share as of August 2010. In 2016, Astley said he never bothered to figure out how much money he earned from YouTube and said that he had also been paid "a chunk of money" by Virgin to appear in a commercial and for his appearance at the Macy's Thanksgiving Parade.

== Track listings ==
7" single

1. "Never Gonna Give You Up" (7" vocal mix) – 3:32
2. "Never Gonna Give You Up" (instrumental) – 3:30

12" maxi

1. "Never Gonna Give You Up" (Cake mix) – 5:46
2. "Never Gonna Give You Up" (instrumental) – 6:19
3. "Never Gonna Give You Up" – 3:32
4. "Never Gonna Give You Up" (Escape to New York mix) – 7:01
5. "Never Gonna Give You Up" (Escape from Newton mix) – 6:23

12" maxi

1. "Never Gonna Give You Up" (Cake mix) – 5:48
2. "Never Gonna Give You Up" (instrumental) – 6:21
3. "Never Gonna Give You Up" – 3:32

12" single

1. "Never Gonna Give You Up" (Escape from Newton mix) – 6:30
2. "Never Gonna Give You Up" (Escape to New York mix) – 7:00

On 29 July 2021, to celebrate 1 billion views on YouTube, Rick Astley released a limited and numbered 7" blue vinyl. Only 2,500 were signed and sold.

1. "Never Gonna Give You Up" (7" vocal mix) – 3:32
2. "Never Gonna Give You Up" (Pianoforte) – 3:30

== Charts ==
=== Weekly charts ===
Weekly chart performance for "Never Gonna Give You Up"
Chart (1987–1988)	Peak position
Australia (ARIA)	1
Austria (Ö3 Austria Top 40)	4
Belgium (Ultratop 50 Flanders)	1
Canada Retail Singles (The Record)	1
Canada Adult Contemporary (RPM)	1
Canada Top Singles (RPM)	1
Denmark (IFPI)	1
Europe (Eurochart Hot 100)	2
Europe (European Airplay Top 50)	2
Finland (Suomen virallinen lista)	1
France (SNEP)	6
Greece (IFPI)	1
Iceland (Íslenski Listinn Topp 10)	2
Iceland (RÚV)	5
Ireland (IRMA)	2
Italy (Musica e dischi)	1
Italy Airplay (Music & Media)	18
Luxembourg (Radio Luxembourg)	2
Netherlands (Dutch Top 40)	1
Netherlands (Single Top 100)	1
New Zealand (Recorded Music NZ)	1
Norway (VG-lista)	1
Quebec (ADISQ)	1
South Africa (Springbok Radio)	1
Spain (AFYVE)	1
Sweden (Sverigetopplistan)	1
Switzerland (Schweizer Hitparade)	2
UK Singles (Official Charts)	1
UK Dance (Music Week)	1
US Billboard Hot 100	1
US Adult Contemporary (Billboard)	1
US Dance Club Songs (Billboard)	1
US Dance Singles Sales (Billboard)	1
US Cash Box Top 100	1
West Germany (GfK)	1
Zimbabwe (ZIMA)	1

2008 weekly chart performance for "Never Gonna Give You Up"
Chart (2008)	Peak position
UK Singles (Official Charts)	73

2025–2026 weekly chart performance for "Never Gonna Give You Up"
Chart (2025–2026)	Peak position
Israel International Airplay (Media Forest)	19
Poland (Polish Airplay Top 100)	97

=== Year-end charts ===
1987 year-end chart performance for "Never Gonna Give You Up"
Chart (1987)	Position
Australia (Australian Music Report)	36
Belgium (Ultratop 50 Flanders)	7
Belgium (Ultratop 50 Wallonia)	5
Denmark (IFPI)	10
Europe (European Hot 100 Singles)	14
Netherlands (Dutch Top 40)	6
Netherlands (Single Top 100)	5
Switzerland (Schweizer Hitparade)	20
UK Singles (OCC)	1
West Germany (Media Control)	14

1988 year-end chart performance for "Never Gonna Give You Up"
Chart (1988)	Position
Australia (ARIA)	8
New Zealand (RIANZ)	15
South Africa (Springbok Radio)	1
US Billboard Hot 100	4
US Adult Contemporary (Billboard)	8
US Cash Box Top 100	2

=== All-time charts ===
All-time chart performance for "Never Gonna Give You Up"
Chart	Position
UK Singles (OCC)	169

== Certifications and sales ==
Certifications for "Never Gonna Give You Up"
Region	Certification	Certified units/sales
Australia (ARIA)	Gold	35,000^{^}
Canada (Music Canada)	Gold	50,000^{^}
Denmark (IFPI Danmark)	Platinum	90,000^{‡}
France (SNEP)	Silver	250,000^{*}
Germany (BVMI)	Gold	500,000^{^}
Italy (FIMI)	Gold	35,000^{‡}
Netherlands (NVPI)	Platinum	100,000^{^}
New Zealand (RMNZ)	3× Platinum	90,000^{‡}
Sweden (GLF)	Gold	25,000^{^}
United Kingdom (BPI) Physical release	Gold	766,000
United Kingdom (BPI) Digital release	2× Platinum	1,200,000^{‡}
United States (RIAA)	5× Platinum	5,000,000^{‡}
^{*} Sales figures based on certification alone.^{^} Shipments figures based on certification alone.^{‡} Sales+streaming figures based on certification alone.

== Cover versions ==
- In 1997, French boy band 2Be3 covered the song under the name "Toujours là pour toi", which peaked at No. 4 in France and No. 12 in Belgium (Wallonia).
- A group of London dance producers called the Rickrollerz made a house music cover version of "Never Gonna Give You Up". In May 2008, the track entered the UK Club Charts at no. 22.
- In 2022, American pop rock band Smash Mouth along with their new singer, Zach Goode covered the song, following the retirement of former lead singer, Steve Harwell.
- In 2023, Astley said on This Morning that he re-recorded the song "with misheard lyrics" saying this intention was to "break the stigma" of hearing loss, which he is experiencing.

== See also ==
- List of best-selling singles by year in the United Kingdom
- List of Billboard Hot 100 number-one singles of 1988
- List of Cash Box Top 100 number-one singles of 1988
- List of Dutch Top 40 number-one singles of 1987
- List of number-one adult contemporary singles of 1988 (U.S.)
- List of number-one dance singles of 1988 (U.S.)
- List of number-one singles in Australia during the 1980s
- List of number-one singles from the 1980s (New Zealand)
- List of number-one singles of 1988 (Canada)
- List of number-one hits of 1987 (Germany)
- List of number-one songs in Norway
- List of number-one singles and albums in Sweden
- List of number-one singles of 1987 (Spain)
- List of UK Singles Chart number ones of the 1980s
- VG-lista 1964 to 1994
- Rickrolling
