= Get Outta My Dreams, Get into My Car =

1988 single by Billy Ocean

- Standard artwork

Single by Billy Ocean

from the album Tear Down These Walls
- B-side: "Showdown"
- Released: 18 January 1988
- Genre: Dance-pop; R&B
- Length: 5:36 (album version); 4:43 (single version)
- Label: Jive
- Songwriters: Billy Ocean; Robert John "Mutt" Lange
- Producer: Robert John "Mutt" Lange

Billy Ocean singles chronology
"Love Really Hurts Without You (1986 Dance Mix)" (1986)	"Get Outta My Dreams, Get into My Car" (1988)	"Calypso Crazy" (1988)

Official video
- "Get Outta My Dreams, Get into My Car" on YouTube

"Get Outta My Dreams, Get into My Car" is a song by the Trinidadian-British singer Billy Ocean, based on a line in the Sherman Brothers' song "You're Sixteen". It was released as the first single from Ocean's seventh studio album, Tear Down These Walls (1988). Part of its popularity lay in its music video, which features animation mixed with live-action sequences. The saxophone solo is performed by Vernon Jeffrey Smith.

"Get Outta My Dreams" became Ocean's third and final US number-one single, topping both the US Billboard Hot 100 and Hot Black Singles charts. It was also his seventh and most recent single to reach the US top 10. The song also peaked at number one in seven other countries, including Canada, where it was the country's most successful single of 1988, and at number three on the UK Singles Chart, making it Ocean's sixth and final top-10 hit there.

== Music video ==
The music video for "Get Outta My Dreams, Get into My Car" consists of Billy Ocean driving, sometimes involving scenes with different cartoon characters. It was featured in the 1988 American teen comedy film License to Drive.

== Chart performance ==
"Get Outta My Dreams, Get into My Car" topped the Billboard Hot 100 for the week of April 9, 1988, staying for two consecutive weeks, tying with his previous chart-topper, "Caribbean Queen (No More Love on the Run)" as his longest chart-topper on the chart. It was subsequently replaced by Whitney Houston's "Where Do Broken Hearts Go", which made history as Houston's seventh consecutive number one single on the chart, breaking a chart record set by The Bee Gees from 1978-1979

== Track listings ==
- 12-inch single (BOS T 1)
1. "Get Outta My Dreams, Get into My Car" (extended version) – 8:59
2. "Get Outta My Dreams, Get into My Car" (7-inch version) – 4:43
3. "Showdown" – 4:58
- 7-inch single (BOS 1)
1. "Get Outta My Dreams, Get into My Car" – 4:10
2. "Showdown" – 4:58
- CD maxi-single (BOS CD1)
1. "Get Outta My Dreams, Get into My Car" (extended version) – 8:59
2. "When the Going Gets Tough, the Tough Get Going" – 4:02
3. "Showdown" – 4:58

== Charts ==
=== Weekly charts ===
Chart (1988–1989)	Peak position
Australia (Kent Music Report)	1
Austria (Ö3 Austria Top 40)	8
Belgium (Ultratop 50 Flanders)	1
Canada Retail Singles (The Record)	1
Canada Top Singles (RPM)	1
Canada Adult Contemporary (RPM)	3
Denmark (IFPI)	4
Europe (European Hot 100 Singles)	2
Finland (Suomen virallinen lista)	6
France (SNEP)	41
Iceland (Íslenski Listinn Topp 10)	4
Ireland (IRMA)	1
Netherlands (Dutch Top 40)	1
Netherlands (Single Top 100)	2
New Zealand (Recorded Music NZ)	2
Norway (VG-lista)	1
South Africa (Springbok Radio)	1
Spain (AFYVE)	5
Sweden (Sverigetopplistan)	4
Switzerland (Schweizer Hitparade)	3
UK Singles (Official Charts)	3
US Billboard Hot 100	1
US Adult Contemporary (Billboard)	5
US Dance Club Songs (Billboard)	25
US Dance Singles Sales (Billboard)	23
US Hot Black Singles (Billboard)	1
West Germany (GfK)	3

=== Year-end charts ===
Chart (1988)	Position
Australia (ARIA)	4
Belgium (Ultratop)	2
Canada Top Singles (RPM)	1
Europe (European Hot 100 Singles)	23
Netherlands (Dutch Top 40)	8
Netherlands (Single Top 100)	13
New Zealand (RIANZ)	5
South Africa (Springbok Radio)	7
Switzerland (Schweizer Hitparade)	26
UK Singles (OCC)	27
US Billboard Hot 100	15
US Adult Contemporary (Billboard)	49
West Germany (Media Control)	26

== Certifications ==
Region	Certification	Certified units/sales
Australia (ARIA)	Platinum	70,000^{‡}
Canada (Music Canada)	Gold	50,000^{^}
United Kingdom (BPI)	Silver	250,000^{^}
^{^} Shipments figures based on certification alone.^{‡} Sales+streaming figures based on certification alone.

== Covers and parodies ==
The song was later covered by pop punk band Fenix TX for the soundtrack of NASCAR Thunder 2003. In 2013, heavy metal band Gwar covered the song in a video featured on The A.V. Club website as part of the site's A.V. Undercover series. Approximately three minutes into the performance, the band incorporates the Who's "Baba O'Riley" into the song. The song is mentioned in a 2014 television advertisement for Twix Bites.

The song was parodied by comedian and actor Jason Sudeikis as 1980s fake singer Ocean Billy in the "Worst of Soul Train" sketch on Saturday Night Live with the title "Get Out of My Car, Get into My Trunk". Amazon Prime later included a version with lyrics rewritten and performed by Jon Batiste in an advertisement to promote Prime Day.

In 1989, on the occasion of the 25th anniversary of the founding of the telecommunications company ENTEL Chile, this song was parodied as "ENTEL está aquí" ("ENTEL is here").

== In popular culture ==
The song was featured on the soundtrack of the 1988 film License to Drive. It appears in a 2018 commercial for Applebee's.

It was used in the climax of season 2, episode 3 of Digman!, "A Sari Sight."

It was used as the theme from the 1/7/26 episode of The Price is Right during its Dream Car Takeover
