= Neon (British band) =

English new wave band (1979–1981)

- Origin: Bath, England
- Genre: New wave
- Years active: 1979–1981
- Labels: Carrere; 3D Music
- Spinoffs: Tears for Fears; Naked Eyes
- Past members: Pete Byrne; Rob Fisher; Curt Smith; Roland Orzabal; Manny Elias; Neil Taylor

Neon were an English new wave band active in the early 1980s. All members went on to have successful careers in other bands, notably Naked Eyes and Tears for Fears.

== History ==
The band were formed in 1979 in Bath, Somerset by Pete Byrne and Rob Fisher. They were then joined by Neil Taylor and Manny Elias, and then Curt Smith and Roland Orzabal as session musicians, who at the time were in the band Graduate. The band's first single, "Making Waves"/"Me I See in You", was released in October 1980 on Byrne and Fisher's own label, 3D Music, followed by "Communication Without Sound"/"Remote Control" in July 1981 on Carrere UK. The band broke up in December 1981.

== After Neon ==
After the split, Byrne and Fisher formed Naked Eyes and found success with "Always Something There to Remind Me" and "Promises, Promises". After Naked Eyes, Byrne moved to California and did session work for other artists, while Fisher did sessions in London and later formed the duo Climie Fisher, who had hits with "Love Changes (Everything)" and "Rise to the Occasion". Fisher died on 25 August 1999 from cancer.

Smith and Orzabal formed Tears for Fears and achieved great success throughout the 1980s and into the 1990s, with both Elias and Taylor also playing with the band. Taylor has also been the guitarist for many other artists, including Easterhouse, Robbie Williams and Chris de Burgh.

== Discography ==
=== Singles ===
- "Making Waves" / "Me I See in You" (1980), 3D Music
- "Communication Without Sound" / "Remote Control" (1981), Carrere
