= This Is Me (Climie Fisher song) =

1986 single by Climie Fisher

- 1988 UK cover

Single by Climie Fisher

from the album Everything
- B-side: "Far Across the Water"
- Released: August 1986; 9 May 1988 (re-release)
- Recorded: 1986
- Studio: The Town House, London
- Genre: Pop
- Length: 3:46
- Label: EMI
- Songwriters: Simon Climie; Rob Fisher
- Producer: Steve Lillywhite

Climie Fisher singles chronology
"This Is Me" (1986)	"Love Changes (Everything)" (1987)

Climie Fisher singles chronology
"Love Changes (Everything) (remix)" (1988)	"This is Me" (1988)	"I Won't Bleed for You" (1988)

"This Is Me" is a song by British pop duo Climie Fisher, originally released in August 1986 as their debut single, but did not break the top 100. After the success of "Rise to the Occasion" and "Love Changes (Everything)", it was re-released in May 1988 and charted at number 22 on the UK Singles Chart. The song features backing vocals by Kirsty MacColl. The music video was directed by Dieter Trattmann and shot at the Albert Wharf Studios in London.

== Reception ==
Reviewing the song for Record Mirror in 1988, Chris Twomey wrote that it "lacks the hooky qualities that made 'Love Changes' an eventual winner. Treading perilously close to Chicago territory here". Richard Lowe for Smash Hits described the song as "an unremarkable "classy" pop single. The tune's all present and correct, there's a dinky little piano bit that runs all the way through it and has a hugely whistleable "hook", and it's bound to be a very big hit. It's not very exciting though…".

== Track listings ==
7":

1. "This Is Me" – 3:46
2. "Far Across the Water" – 4:15

12": (UK, 1986)

1. "This Is Me" (Extended) – 6:25
2. "This Is Me" (7" Version) – 3:46
3. "Far Across the Water" – 4:15

12": (UK and Europe, 1986)

1. "This Is Me" – 8:56
2. "This Is Me" – 3:46
3. "Far Across the Water" – 4:15

12": (UK and Europe, 1988)

1. "This Is Me" ('This Is It' Mix) – 7:38
2. "This Is Me" – 3:48
3. "Far Across the Water" – 4:28

CD: (UK 1988)

1. "This Is Me" (7" Version)
2. "Far Across the Water"
3. "This Is Me" (12" Version)
4. "Love Changes (Everything)"

== Personnel ==
- Simon Climie – vocals
- Rob Fisher – keyboards
- Kirsty MacColl – backing vocals
- Neil Taylor – guitar
- Pino Palladino – bass guitar
- David Palmer – drums
- Luís Jardim – additional percussion
- Alan Douglas – engineer

== Charts ==
Chart (1986)	Peak position
UK Singles (OCC)	106

Chart (1988–89)	Peak position
Australia (ARIA)	128
Belgium (Ultratop 50 Flanders)	26
Germany (GfK)	60
Ireland (IRMA)	12
Netherlands (Single Top 100)	34
New Zealand (Recorded Music NZ)	43
UK Singles (OCC)	22
