= Room to Move =

Single by Animotion

from the album Animotion (Room to Move)
- B-side: "Send It Over"
- Released: February 1989
- Recorded: 1987
- Genre: New wave, dance-rock
- Length: 4:37
- Label: Polydor 871418
- Songwriters: Simon Climie, Rob Fisher, Dennis Morgan
- Producers: Steve Barri, Tony Peluso

Animotion singles chronology
"I Want You" (1986)	"Room to Move" (1989)	"Calling It Love" (1988)

Audio
- "Room to Move" on YouTube

"Room to Move" is a pop song written by Simon Climie, Rob Fisher (of the duo Climie Fisher) and Dennis Morgan. It first appeared on Climie Fisher's debut album Everything, released in 1987.

== Animotion recording ==
It was remade by new wave band Animotion in 1988 and included on their 1989 eponymous third album. Animotion released the song as a single, and it reached number 9 on the Billboard Hot 100, being the band's second and last US top ten hit, since "Obsession" in 1984. Cynthia Rhodes and Paul Engemann shared lead vocals on the song.

=== Chart performance ===
Chart (1989)	Peak position
Canada Top Singles (The Record)	21
UK Singles (The Official Charts Company)	87
US Billboard Hot 100	9

== Use in other media ==
The Animotion recording was featured in the 1988 science-fiction comedy film, My Stepmother Is an Alien.
