= The One You Love =

The One You Love may refer to:

- "The One You Love" (Glenn Frey song), 1982
- "The One You Love" (Rufus Wainwright song), 2005
- "The One You Love" (Paulina Rubio song), 2002
- "The Ones You Love", a 1993 song by Rick Astley
