= Neil Taylor (guitarist) =

- Born: Neil Martin Taylor; 26 January 1961 (age 65); Bradford-on-Avon, Wiltshire, England
- Genres: Rock; pop
- Occupation: Musician
- Instruments: Guitar; vocals
- Years active: 1980–present
- Formerly of: Neon

Neil Martin Taylor (born 26 January 1961) is an English guitarist, best known for his long-time affiliation with Robbie Williams and for his work with Tears for Fears.

== Career ==
Born in Wiltshire and raised in Bristol, Taylor started playing in local bands in his youth before joining Bath-based Neon as a session musician in the early 1980s. During this time he met Curt Smith and Roland Orzabal who, after founding Tears for Fears, asked Taylor to tour with them and play guitar tracks for their second album, Songs from the Big Chair (1985), and their third album, The Seeds of Love (1989). Taylor toured with the band several times between 1983 and 1990 and appeared on their live concert videos In My Mind's Eye (1984) and Going to California (1990).

In the mid-1980s, he formed the short-lived duo Violent Blue alongside bassist Charlie Jones, with the group releasing their first and only album, You've Got to Stay Young in 1985 under Magnet Records. In the 1990s, he went on to play with several artists before becoming a regular member of Robbie Williams' band in 2003. Taylor has played guitar for many artists including Tina Turner, Howard Jones, Chris de Burgh, Natalie Imbruglia, Easterhouse and James Morrison.

=== Solo ===
In 2011, Taylor released his first solo album, No Self Control, and toured Germany assisted by Gary Nuttal. In April 2012, he released his second album Chasing Butterflies.

== Discography ==
- Tears for Fears – Songs from the Big Chair (1985)
- Red Box – The Circle & The Square (1986)
- Climie Fisher – Everything (1987)
- Jane Wiedlin – Fur (1988)
- Holly Johnson – Blast (1989)
- Tina Turner – Foreign Affair (1989)
- Morrissey – "The Last of the Famous International Playboys" (1989)
- Tears for Fears – The Seeds of Love (1989)
- Easterhouse – Waiting for the Redbird (1989)
- Propaganda – 1234 (1990)
- Tina Turner – Simply the Best (1991)
- Howard Jones – In the Running (1992)
- Simon Climie – Soul Inspiration (1992)
- The Beloved – Conscience (1993)
- Wendy James – Now Ain't the Time for Your Tears (1993)
- Chris de Burgh – This Way Up (1994)
- Heather Nova – Siren (1998)
- Robbie Williams – Sing When You're Winning (2000)
- Natalie Imbruglia – White Lilies Island (2001)
- Naked Eyes – Everything and More (2001)
- Nick Carter – "Help Me" (2002)
- Robbie Williams – Escapology (2002)
- Brian McFadden – "Real to Me" (2004)
- Natalie Imbruglia – Counting Down the Days (2005)
- Robbie Williams – Intensive Care (2005)
- James Morrison – Undiscovered (2006)
- Robbie Williams – Rudebox (2006)
- Neil Taylor – No Self Control (2011)
- Neil Taylor – Chasing Butterflies (2012)
- Neil Taylor – No God Like Rock 'n' Roll (2013)
- Robbie Williams – Under the Radar Volume 1 (2014)
- Neil Taylor – Silverwing (2015)
- Robbie Williams – Under the Radar Volume 2 (2017)
