= Hopelessly =

Single by Rick Astley

from the album Body & Soul
- B-side: "When I Fall in Love"; "Hold Me in Your Arms"; "Whenever You Need Somebody"; "Never Gonna Give You Up"; "Together Forever"; "She Wants to Dance with Me"
- Released: August 1993
- Length: 3:35
- Label: RCA
- Songwriters: Rick Astley; Rob Fisher
- Producers: Gary Stevenson; Rick Astley

Rick Astley singles chronology
"Wonderful You" (1991)	"Hopelessly" (1993)	"The Ones You Love" (1993)

Music video
- "Hopelessly" on YouTube

"Hopelessly" is a song performed by English singer-songwriter Rick Astley and written by Rob Fisher and Astley. It was produced by Gary Stevenson and Astley. The song was recorded for Astley's fourth album, Body & Soul (1993). It was released as a single in 1993 by RCA Records. The single peaked at number 33 on the UK Singles Chart, number 28 in the United States, and number eight in Canada.

The song had originally been intended to feature in the 1993 film Body of Evidence, starring Madonna and Willem Dafoe and was going to make up part of the soundtrack for the film and the subsequent album that followed was planned around the film; however, it was decided last minute by the film's production team that there were not going to be any songs in the film, just an orchestral backing. Astley later said that the decision by the film's production team "changed everything. Suddenly, the record label was stuck with an album that no one really wanted, that hadn't really been A&R'd and that no longer had a reason to exist. What were they going to do?"

== Track listing ==
Studio version

1. "Hopelessly" – 3:35
2. "When I Fall in Love" – 3:02
3. "Hold Me in Your Arms" – 4:24
4. "Whenever You Need Somebody" – 3:28

Live version

1. "Hopelessly" (live, recorded in Italy, September 1993) – 2:58
2. "Never Gonna Give You Up" – 3:32
3. "Together Forever" – 3:24
4. "She Wants to Dance with Me" – 3:15

== Personnel ==
- Rick Astley – vocals
- Dave West – keyboards, bass, drum programming
- Richard Cottle – electric piano
- Jim Williams – classical guitar

== Charts ==
=== Weekly charts ===
Weekly chart performance for "Hopelessly"
Chart (1993–1994)	Peak position
Canada Top Singles (RPM)	8
Canada Adult Contemporary (RPM)	3
Europe (Eurochart Hot 100)	88
Iceland (Íslenski Listinn Topp 40)	31
Panama (UPI)	4
Quebec (ADISQ)	21
UK Singles (Official Charts)	33
UK Airplay (ERA)	88
US Billboard Hot 100	28
US Adult Contemporary (Billboard)	4
US Cash Box Top 100	22

=== Year-end chart ===
1993 year-end chart performance for "Hopelessly"
Chart (1993)	Position
Canada Top Singles (RPM)	61
Canada Adult Contemporary (RPM)	21
US Adult Contemporary (Billboard)	37

1994 year-end chart performance for "Hopelessly"
Chart (1994)	Position
US Adult Contemporary (Billboard)	45
