= Fuel for the Fire =

Fuel for the Fire may refer to:

- Fuel for the Fire (band)
- Fuel for the Fire (Naked Eyes album), 1984
- Fuel for the Fire (Ari Koivunen album), 2007
- Fuel for the Fire (EP), a 1997 EP by Impellitteri
- "Fuel for the Fire" (Star Wars Resistance)
