= Move Right Out =

Single by Rick Astley

from the album Free
- Released: 25 March 1991
- Genre: Pop; soul
- Length: 3:54
- Label: RCA
- Songwriters: Rick Astley; Rob Fisher
- Producers: Gary Stevenson; Rick Astley

Rick Astley singles chronology
"Cry for Help" (1991)	"Move Right Out" (1991)	"Never Knew Love" (1991)

Music video
- "Move Right Out" on YouTube

"Move Right Out" is a song performed by English singer-songwriter Rick Astley and written by Astley and Rob Fisher. It was produced by Gary Stevenson and Astley. The song was recorded for Astley's third album, Free (1991), his first album without Stock Aitken Waterman companion. It was released as the album's second single on 25 March 1991 by RCA Records. The single peaked at number 58 on the UK Singles Chart. The song is written in the key of G minor.

On 31 July 2024, the original music video was upgraded to 4K to celebrate the reissue of Free.

== Track listing ==
- 12" single and CD maxi
1. "Move Right Out" (7" version) – 3:54
2. "Move Right Out" (12" mix) – 6:35
3. "Move Right Out" (vox, piano, strings mix) – 3:35
- 7" single
1. "Move Right Out" (radio mix) – 3:53
2. "Cry for Help" (edit) – 4:03
- Mini CD single
1. "Move Right Out" – 3:53
2. "Move Right Out" (vox, piano, strings mix) – 3:34
- Cassette single
1. "Move Right Out" (radio remix) – 3:54
2. "The Bottom Line" – 5:13

== Personnel ==
- Rick Astley – lead vocals
- Rob Fisher – acoustic piano
- Dave West – synthesizers, organ
- Robert Ahwai – guitars
- Hywel Maggs – guitars
- Lars Danielsson – bass
- Per Lindval – drums
- Jacob Andersen – percussion
- Larry Williams – saxophones
- Bill Reichenbach Jr. – trombone
- Larry Hall – trumpet
- Jerry Hey – brass arrangements
- Anne Dudley – string arrangements and conductor
- Carol Kenyon – backing vocals
- Dee Lewis – backing vocals

== Charts ==
Chart (1991)	Peak position
Australia (ARIA)	110
Canada Top Singles (RPM)	36
Europe (European Hit Radio)	11
Germany (GfK)	52
Italy (Musica e dischi)	21
Netherlands (Single Top 100)	66
Quebec (ADISQ)	28
UK Singles (Official Charts)	58
UK Airplay (Music Week)	14
US Billboard Hot 100	81
US Adult Contemporary (Billboard)	29
US Cash Box Top 100	75
