= Pete Byrne =

English singer (1952–2026)

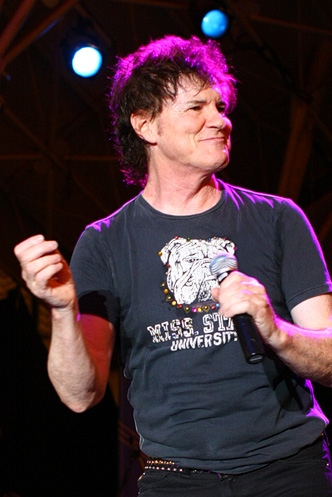
- Byrne performing in Las Vegas, July 23, 2011

Background information
- Born: Peter James Byrne; 9 June 1952; Islington, North London, England
- Died: 14 September 2026 (aged 74) Los Angeles, California, US
- Genres: New wave; synth-pop
- Occupations: Singer; songwriter
- Instruments: Vocals; guitar
- Years active: 1976–2026
- Label: A Different Drum
- Formerly of: Naked Eyes; Neon

Peter James Byrne (9 June 1952 – 14 September 2026) was an English singer and songwriter, best known for being the lead vocalist of the new wave and synth-pop band Naked Eyes.

== Early years ==
Peter James Byrne was born in Islington, North London, on 9 June 1952, the fourth of six children of James and Olive (née Salusbury) Byrne. He left secondary school at the age of 16 to study art in Essex. Later he moved to Bath, where he joined the local music scene.

== Career ==
Along with Roland Orzabal, Curt Smith, and Manny Elias of Tears for Fears fame, Byrne and his future music partner in Naked Eyes, Rob Fisher, were members of a short-lived new wave band called Neon.

Byrne and Fisher formed Naked Eyes in 1982. Naked Eyes' first hit, "Always Something There to Remind Me", is a synth-pop cover version of the Burt Bacharach standard. The band had three subsequent top 40 hits: "Promises, Promises" "When the Lights Go Out", and "(What) In the Name of Love".

Naked Eyes disbanded following the release of their second studio album, Fuel for the Fire (1984).

He is also known for an electronic cover version of the Rolling Stones' 1966 song "Paint It Black". He wrote "I Am the Cute One" for the Olsen twins' video, "Our First Video". Byrne also provided backing vocals on Stevie Wonder's 1985 US No. 1 single "Part-Time Lover".

In 2001, Byrne released his debut and sole solo studio album The Real Illusion; the album featured some of the last tracks he had written with Fisher for a proposed third Naked Eyes studio album.

In 2005, Byrne reformed Naked Eyes.

Naked Eyes released Fumbling with the Covers, an album of cover versions and Naked Eyes hits, in 2007.

In 2008, Naked Eyes completed a US tour known as the Regeneration Tour along with Belinda Carlisle of the Go-Go's, ABC and the Human League.

On 8 June 2021, Naked Eyes released their final studio album, Disguise the Limit.

== Personal life and death ==
Byrne married the poet and artist Elena Karina Byrne; they divorced in 2015. He had three children. He died in Los Angeles, California, on 14 September 2026, aged 74, after a brief illness.

== Discography ==
=== Solo albums ===
- The Real Illusion (2001)

=== With Neon ===
- "Making Waves" / "Me I See in You" (1980)
- "Communication Without Sound" (1981)

=== With Naked Eyes ===
- Burning Bridges (1983)
- Fuel for the Fire (1984)
- Fumbling with the Covers (2007)
- Disguise the Limit (2021)
