= FFTF =

FFTF may refer to:

- Fast Flux Test Facility, an American nuclear test reactor
- Fight for the Future, a non-profit advocacy group
- Fuel for the fire, which may refer to multiple things.
