= Wonderful You =

Wonderful You may refer to:

- Wonderful You (TV series), a British drama television series
- "Wonderful You" (song), a 1991 song by Rick Astley
