= Body & Soul (Rick Astley album) =

Studio album by Rick Astley
- Released: 20 September 1993
- Recorded: August 1992 – June 1993
- Genres: Dance-pop; pop; electronic
- Length: 45:12
- Label: RCA
- Producers: Gary Stevenson; Rick Astley

Rick Astley chronology
| Free (1991) | Body & Soul (1993) | Keep It Turned On (2001) |

Singles from Body & Soul
- 1. "The Ones You Love" Released: 23 August 1993; 2. "Hopelessly" Released: 1 November 1993

Professional ratings
Review scores
| Source | Rating |
|---|---|
| AllMusic | 2/5 stars |
| MSN Music | 1.5/5 stars |

Body & Soul is the fourth studio album by English singer Rick Astley released in 1993. It was commercially unsuccessful and became the first album released by Astley to miss the UK album chart. It did enter the Italian album chart at No. 28. Two singles were released to support the album, "Hopelessly" which charted in the UK at No. 33 and "The Ones You Love" which peaked at No. 48.

Following the release of this album, Astley took a hiatus from music for several years until the release of the 2001 single "Sleeping".

== Track listing ==
| No. | Title | Writer(s) | Length |
|---|---|---|---|
| 1. | "The Ones You Love" | Rick Astley; Dave West | 4:40 |
| 2. | "Waiting for the Bell to Ring" | Astley; West | 4:53 |
| 3. | "Hopelessly" | Astley; Rob Fisher | 3:34 |
| 4. | "A Dream for Us" | Astley; Bruce Roberts | 6:07 |
| 5. | "Body and Soul" | Astley | 4:09 |
| 6. | "Enough Love" | Astley; Andy Morris; Ian Devaney; Lisa Stansfield | 4:07 |
| 7. | "Nature's Gift" | Astley; Morris; Devaney; Stansfield | 4:26 |
| 8. | "Remember the Days" | Astley; Fisher | 3:57 |
| 9. | "Everytime" | Astley; West; Gary Stevenson | 4:53 |
| 10. | "When You Love Someone" | Astley | 4:14 |
| Total length: | | | 45:12 |

Japanese release bonus track
| No. | Title | Writer(s) | Length |
|---|---|---|---|
| 11. | "Stop Breaking Your Heart" | Astley; Stevenson | 4:13 |
| Total length: | | | 49:25 |

=== 2010 reissue ===
On 3 May 2010 an expanded edition of Body and Soul was released in a package together with Free, containing remastered and expanded editions of both albums across two discs.

Body & Soul... Plus bonus tracks
| No. | Title | Writer(s) | Length |
|---|---|---|---|
| 11. | "Stop Breaking Your Heart" | Astley; Stevenson | 4:13 |
| 12. | "The Ones You Love" (single edit) | Astley; West | 4:22 |
| 13. | "Hopelessly" (live) | Astley; Fisher | 3:49 |
| 14. | "Move Right Out" (12" mix) | Astley; Fisher | 6:35 |
| 15. | "Never Knew Love" (The 3 Day mix) | Derek Bordeaux; John Paul | 8:37 |
| 16. | "The Ones You Love" (instrumental) | Astley; West | 4:51 |

== Personnel ==
=== Musicians ===
- Rick Astley – lead vocals, backing vocals (5–7, 9)
- Dave West – keyboards, drum programming, bass (1–3, 10), organ (10)
- Richard Cottle – electric piano (3), keyboards (4, 5, 8), Wurlitzer electric piano (4, 5, 8), synth bass (4, 5, 8)
- Jim Williams – classical guitar (3)
- Tony Patler – guitars (6, 7, 9), Moog bass (6, 7, 9)
- Felix Krish – bass guitar (8)
- Mark Brzezicki – live drums (1)
- Ian Thomas – percussion (2, 4, 6–9)
- Nigel Hitchcock – saxophone (2, 4, 6, 8), guitars (8)
- Derek Green – backing vocals (1, 2, 4, 6–10)
- Paul "T.J." Lee – backing vocals (1, 2, 4, 6–10)
- Beverley Skeete – backing vocals (1, 2)
- Gina Foster – backing vocals (10)

=== Production ===
- Rick Astley – producer
- Gary Stevenson – producer, engineer
- Tom Lord-Alge – mixing
- Norman Moore – art direction, design
- Paul Cox – photography

== Charts ==
Chart performance for Body & Soul
| Chart (1993) | Peak position |
|---|---|
| Italian Albums (Musica e dischi) | 28 |
| US Billboard 200 | 185 |
