= Coming In for the Kill =

Studio album by Climie Fisher
- Released: 9 October 1989
- Studios: Abbey Road Studios, Mayfair Studios, Advision Studios, Sarm Studios and Metropolis Studios (London, England, UK); Power Station, Skyline Studios and Marathon Studios (New York City, New York, USA); Conway Studios and Sunset Sound Recorders (Hollywood, California, USA)
- Genre: Pop
- Length: 41:08
- Labels: EMI, Edsel
- Producers: Simon Climie; Rob Fisher; Stewart Levine; Neil Dorfsman

Climie Fisher chronology
Everything (1988)	Coming In for the Kill (1989)	Twice as Much (1992)

Coming In for the Kill is the second and final album by British pop duo Climie Fisher. The album was released in 9 October 1989. The album was less successful than its predecessor Everything, peaking at number 35 in the United Kingdom. The track "Facts of Love" was later covered by Christian pop singer, Kim Boyce three years later on her 1992 album of the same name.

In 2009 the record company Edsel re-released and remastered both Climie Fisher albums, and included all the original b-sides, with the notable exception of the original version of "Love Like a River".

== Track listing ==
All tracks written by Simon Climie, Rob Fisher and Dennis Morgan except where indicated.

1. "Facts of Love" – 3:41
2. "Fire on the Ocean" – 4:17
3. "It's Not Supposed to Be That Way" – 3:47
4. "Hold on Through the Night" – 3:52
5. "Buried Treasure" – 4:33
6. "Power of the Dreamworld" – 5:13
7. "The Best Part of Living" – 3:50
8. "Coming In for the Kill" (Climie, Lamont Dozier, Fisher) – 4:13
9. "Don't Mess Around" – 3:33
10. "You Keep Me Coming Back for More" – 4:09

== 2009 re-release track listing ==
1. "Facts of Love" – 3:43
2. "Fire on the Ocean" – 4:17
3. "It's Not Supposed to Be That Way" – 3:48
4. "Hold on Through the Night" – 3:53
5. "Buried Treasure" – 4:33
6. "Power of the Dreamworld" – 5:14
7. "The Best Part of Living" – 3:51
8. "Coming In for the Kill" – 4:13
9. "Don't Mess Around" – 3:35
10. "You Keep Me Coming Back for More" – 4:08
11. "Cold Light of Day" – 3:43
12. "Gypsy" – 3:50
13. "Memories (If I Could Relive Your Love)" (Climie, Fisher, Dennis Morgan) – 5:57
14. "Godsend" (Climie, Fisher, Morgan) – 4:07
15. "You're Not Alone in This World" (Climie, Fisher, Morgan) – 5:57
16. "Rhythm of the World" – 4:23
17. "The Way It Should Be" – 6:30

== Personnel ==
Climie Fisher

- Simon Climie – vocals
- Rob Fisher – keyboards, bass and drum programming

Additional musicians

- Jeff Bova – additional keyboard programming (1)
- Steve Khan – guitars (1, 3, 6, 8), acoustic guitar (2), lead guitar (7)
- Eddie Martinez – guitars (1)
- Chester Kamen – lead guitar (2)
- Neil Taylor – rhythm guitar (2), guitars (4)
- J.J. Belle – guitars (3, 5, 9, 10), rhythm guitar (7)
- Nathan East – bass guitar (1–4, 6)
- Pino Palladino – fretless bass (5)
- Jimmy Bralower – additional drum programming (1)
- Richie Stevens – drums (7)
- Carol Steele – percussion (1–4, 6, 8, 10)
- Lenny Castro – percussion (7)
- Tawatha Agee – backing vocals (1, 3, 4, 6–8)
- Frank Simms – backing vocals (1, 6)
- Vaneese Thomas – backing vocals (1, 6)
- Fonzi Thornton – backing vocals (1, 3, 4, 6–9)
- Dee Lewis – backing vocals (2, 3, 5, 7, 9, 10)
- Mae McKenna – backing vocals (2)
- Brenda White-King – backing vocals (3, 7–9)
- Curtis King – backing vocals (3, 4, 7–9)
- Shirley Lewis – backing vocals (7)

== Production ==
- Climie Fisher – producers (1–4, 6, 8–10)
- Neil Dorfsman – producer (1, 6)
- Bob Clearmountain – additional producer (2)
- Stuart Levine – producer (5, 7)
- Bill Smith Studio – design
- Paul Cox – photography

Technical credits

- Bob Clearmountain – mixing (1, 2, 4)
- Neil Dorfsman – engineer (1, 6)
- Pete Schwier – engineer (2, 4, 7–10)
- Josh Abbey – engineer (3, 4, 8–11), mixing (3, 7–10)
- Bob Kraushaar – engineer (3)
- Darren Klein – engineer (5, 7)
- Gary Solomon – assistant engineer (1)

== Singles ==
- "Facts of Love" (UK #50, Germany #54)
- "Fire on the Ocean" (UK #89)
- "It's Not Supposed to Be That Way" (UK #77)

== Chart performance ==
Chart	Peak position
South African Album Chart	6
UK Album Chart	35
Swedish Album Chart	36
