= Burning Bridges (Naked Eyes album) =

Studio album by Naked Eyes
- Released: 16 March 1983
- Recorded: 1982–1983
- Studios: Abbey Road (London); Eel Pie (Twickenham)
- Genres: Synth-pop; new wave
- Length: 44:03
- Labels: EMI (UK/Europe); EMI America (US/Canada)
- Producer: Tony Mansfield

Naked Eyes chronology
Burning Bridges (1983)	Fuel for the Fire (1984)

North America/Japan cover

Singles from Burning Bridges
- 1. "Always Something There to Remind Me" Released: January 1983; 2. "Promises, Promises" Released: 1983; 3. "When the Lights Go Out" Released: 1983; 4. "Voices in My Head" Released: 1983

Professional ratings
Review scores
Source	Rating
AllMusic	4/5 stars

Burning Bridges is the debut studio album by the English new wave and synth-pop duo Naked Eyes, released on 16 March 1983 by EMI and EMI America Records. The album was released in the United States and Canada as Naked Eyes with two tracks demoted to B-sides. The track "Always Something There to Remind Me" was released as a single and reached No. 59 on the UK singles chart and US No. 8 in July 1983 before "Promises, Promises" reached US No. 11 and "When the Lights Go Out" US No. 37. The album was released for the first time on CD in 2012 by Cherry Red Records.

== Track listing ==
All tracks are written by Pete Byrne and Rob Fisher, except where noted.

Side one
No.	Title	Writer(s)	Length
1.	"Voices in My Head"		3:47
2.	"I Could Show You How"		3:28
3.	"A Very Hard Act to Follow"		4:05
4.	"Always Something There to Remind Me"	Burt Bacharach; Hal David	3:40
5.	"Fortune & Fame"		3:18
6.	"Could Be"		2:47

Side two
No.	Title	Length
7.	"Burning Bridges"	3:30
8.	"Emotion in Motion"	4:42
9.	"Low Life"	3:57
10.	"The Time Is Now"	3:23
11.	"When the Lights Go Out"	3:00
12.	"Promises, Promises"	4:26

=== US release ===
The North American release of Burning Bridges was issued in April 1983, retitled as Naked Eyes and released with an alternate cover.

Side one
No.	Title	Length
1.	"Always Something There to Remind Me"	3:40
2.	"Fortune and Fame"	3:18
3.	"When the Lights Go Out"	3:00
4.	"Voices in My Head"	3:47
5.	"Low Life"	3:57

Side two
No.	Title	Length
6.	"Promises, Promises"	3:46
7.	"I Could Show You How"	3:28
8.	"Emotion in Motion"	4:42
9.	"Burning Bridges"	3:30
10.	"Could Be"	2:47

The two deleted songs, "The Time Is Now" and "A Very Hard Act to Follow" were issued in the US as the B-sides of "Always Something There to Remind Me" and "Promises, Promises." The single, "Sweet Poison" was absent from the album and later issued as a single, then paired as a B-side for "Voices in My Head", both on vinyl, 7". Also, "Pit Stop" was released as a B-side for "Always Something There to Remind Me" on vinyl, 12", maxi single, in late 1982.

== Personnel ==
Naked Eyes

- Pete Byrne – vocals
- Rob Fisher – keyboards (Fairlight CMI, Synclavier 2, PPG Wave 2.2, E-mu Emulator, Oberheim OB-Xa, Prophet-5), grand piano, harpsichord

Additional musicians

- Tony Mansfield – guitars, bass guitar, Simmons drums, Linn LM-1 programming
- Phil Towner – drums
- C. C. Smith – horns
- Martin Dobson – saxophone, flute

Tony Mansfield is listed as having played "guitar" (but not "bass guitar") on the British version of the album (Burning Bridges), while on the American version (self-titled), he is listed as playing "bass guitar" (but not "guitar"). It thus seems reasonable to assume that he played both instruments on the album.

Production

- Tony Mansfield – producer
- Hadyn Bendall – engineer
- Jules Bowen – engineer
- Bill Smith – art direction, design
- Andrew Douglas – photography

== Charts ==
Chart performance for Burning Bridges/Naked Eyes
Chart (1983)	Peak position
Australian Albums (Kent Music Report)	88
New Zealand Albums (RMNZ)	28
US Billboard 200	32
