= Lou Johnson (singer) =

American singer and pianist (1941–2019)

Background information
- Born: February 11, 1941; Brooklyn, New York, U.S.
- Died: May 1, 2019 (aged 78) San Bernardino, California, U.S.
- Genre: Soul
- Occupations: Singer and pianist
- Instruments: Vocals, piano
- Years active: 1958–1976

Lou Johnson (February 11, 1941 – May 1, 2019) was an American soul singer and pianist who was active as a recording artist in the 1960s and early 1970s.

== Life and career ==
Coming from a musical family, he started singing in gospel choirs in his teens, before studying music at Brooklyn College. He learned keyboards and percussion, forming a gospel group, the Zionettes, who recorded for Simpson Records and achieved some local success. Johnson then formed a secular vocal group, the Canjoes, with Tresia Cleveland and Ann Gissendammer, recording "Dance the Boomerang" before Cleveland and Gissendanner left to become the Soul Sisters.

In 1962, Johnson signed as a solo singer with Bigtop Records, run by the Hill & Range music publishing company in the Brill Building. There, he met the songwriting team of Burt Bacharach and Hal David, who wrote Johnson's first single, "If I Never Get to Love You". Neither that song nor his second record, "You Better Let Him Go", were hits, but his third single, "Reach Out for Me", also written by Bacharach and David and this time produced by Bacharach, reached No. 74 on the Billboard Hot 100 in late 1963. However, as it rose up the charts, the record company collapsed so limiting the record's success. "Magic Potion" – the B side of "Reach Out For Me" was also written by Bacharach and David and became popular on the UK's Northern Soul scene, first being played at Manchester's Twisted Wheel club in the late 1960s.

Johnson signed to its successor label, Big Hill, and continued to record Bacharach and David songs. In 1964, his original version of "(There's) Always Something There to Remind Me", with backing vocals by Doris Troy, Dee Dee Warwick, and Cissy Houston, reached No. 49 in the US charts. In the United Kingdom, a cover version by English singer Sandie Shaw rose to number one on the British singles chart.

Johnson also recorded the original versions of several other Bacharach and David songs that later proved to be bigger hits for other musicians. "Reach Out for Me", "Message to Michael (Kentucky Bluebird)" (originally "A Message to Martha"), and "(There's) Always Something There to Remind Me" were all American hits, also produced by Bacharach and David, for Dionne Warwick. Several of his records reached the Cashbox R&B Top 20 including "Always" peaking at No. 12 and "Reach Out" at No. 15. In the UK Singles Chart, Johnson's version of "A Message to Martha" was his biggest hit, reaching No. 36 in late 1964, but was outsold by Adam Faith's cover version.

In 1965, working with the production team of Bill Giant, Bernie Baum and Florence Kaye on the reactivated Bigtop label, Johnson recorded a vocal version of Sidney Bechet's instrumental hit of a few years earlier, "Petite Fleur", entitled "A Time to Love, A Time to Cry". He appeared on the British TV programme Ready Steady Go! to promote it, but neither it nor its follow-ups, a version of the jazz standard "Anytime" and then a version of "Walk On By" co-produced by Allen Toussaint, were successful, and the record company's choice of songs distanced him from his earlier audience. An album, also called Anytime, went unreleased as the record company again collapsed. The B side of "A Time To Love, A Time To Cry", titled "Unsatisfied" was adopted by the UK's Northern soul scene.

Johnson recorded two albums in the late 1960s and early 1970s. The first, Sweet Southern Soul, for the Atlantic subsidiary Cotillion, was produced by the company's main R&B producer, Jerry Wexler, at Fame Studios in Muscle Shoals. Allen Toussaint produced the second, With You in Mind, at his New Orleans studio for Stax's Volt label, but neither proved successful. After moving to Orange County, California, Johnson became a nightclub entertainer. He sometimes performed in a latter-day version of the Ink Spots.

A CD retrospective of Johnson's recordings with Bigtop/Big Hill Records in the 1960s was put together by the UK label Ace/Kent Records in 2010. It contains "audio-restored" versions of all of his known recordings made at the time, including his work with Bacharach.

Johnson died aged 78, on May 1, 2019, in San Bernardino, California.

== Discography ==
=== Chart singles ===
Year	Single	Chart Positions	
Year	Single	US Pop	UK
1963	"Reach Out for Me" / "Magic Potion"	74	–
1964	"(There's) Always Something There to Remind Me"	49	–
1964	"Message to Martha (Kentucky Bluebird)"	–	36
1965	"A Time to Love – A Time to Cry (Petite Fleur)" / "Unsatisfied"	59	–
