= Everything (Climie Fisher album) =

Studio album by Climie Fisher
- Released: 1 February 1988
- Studios: Townhouse; Mayfair; Eel Pie; Advision; Rooster; Sarm West (London, England); Sigma Sound (New York City, US)
- Genre: Pop
- Length: 47:35; 79:20 (re-release)
- Labels: EMI; Edsel
- Producers: Stephen Hague; Steve Lillywhite; Simon Climie; Rob Fisher

Climie Fisher chronology
Everything (1988)	Coming In for the Kill (1989)

Professional ratings
Review scores
Source	Rating
AllMusic	3/5 stars
New Musical Express	6/10
Number One	2/5 stars
Record Mirror	2/5 stars

Everything is the debut album by the British pop duo Climie Fisher, released in February 1988. The album includes the duo's biggest hit and best-remembered single, "Love Changes (Everything)", and reached No. 14 on the UK Albums Chart. Their song "Room to Move" was remade by the group Animotion on their 1989 self-titled album.

The song "Love Changes (Everything)" was used in the movie How I Got into College.

In 2009, the record company Edsel re-released and remastered both Climie Fisher albums, and included all the original B-sides, with the notable exception of the original version of "Love Like a River".

== Track listing ==
No.	Title	Writer(s)	Length
1.	"Love Changes (Everything)"	Simon Climie; Rob Fisher; Dennis Morgan	4:30
2.	"Rise to the Occasion"	Climie; Fisher; Morgan	4:48
3.	"I Won't Bleed for You"	Climie; Fisher; Morgan	4:23
4.	"Room to Move"	Climie; Fisher; Morgan	4:29
5.	"Precious Moments"	Climie; Fisher	3:52
6.	"Rise to the Occasion" (Hip Hop Mix)	Climie; Fisher; Morgan	4:16
7.	"This Is Me"	Climie; Fisher	3:55
8.	"Never Let a Chance Go By"	Climie; Fisher	4:32
9.	"Bite the Hand That Feed"	Climie; Fisher	4:29
10.	"Break the Silence"	Climie; Fisher	4:18
11.	"Keeping the Mystery Alive"	Climie; Fisher; Morgan	4:03
Total length:			47:35

International track listing – although the songs are the same, the running order is different
No.	Title	Writer(s)	Length
1.	"Love Changes (Everything)"	Climie; Fisher; Morgan	4:30
2.	"Rise to the Occasion"	Climie; Fisher; Morgan	4:48
3.	"I Won't Bleed for You"	Climie; Fisher; Morgan	4:23
4.	"Room to Move"	Climie; Fisher; Morgan	4:29
5.	"Precious Moments"	Climie; Fisher	3:52
6.	"This Is Me"	Climie; Fisher	3:55
7.	"Never Let a Chance Go By"	Climie; Fisher	4:32
8.	"Bite the Hand That Feed"	Climie; Fisher	4:29
9.	"Break the Silence"	Climie; Fisher	4:18
10.	"Keeping the Mystery Alive"	Climie; Fisher; Morgan	4:03
11.	"Rise to the Occasion" (Hip Hop Mix)	Climie; Fisher; Morgan	4:16
Total length:			47:35

Everything...Plus 2009 re-release
No.	Title	Writer(s)	Length
1.	"Love Changes (Everything)"	Climie; Fisher; Morgan	4:30
2.	"Rise to the Occasion"	Climie; Fisher; Morgan	4:48
3.	"I Won't Bleed for You"	Climie; Fisher; Morgan	4:23
4.	"Room to Move"	Climie; Fisher; Morgan	4:29
5.	"Precious Moments"	Climie; Fisher	3:52
6.	"Rise to the Occasion" (Hip Hop Mix)	Climie; Fisher; Morgan	4:16
7.	"This Is Me"	Climie; Fisher	3:55
8.	"Never Let a Chance Go By"	Climie; Fisher	4:32
9.	"Bite the Hand That Feed"	Climie; Fisher	4:29
10.	"Break the Silence"	Climie; Fisher	4:18
11.	"Keeping the Mystery Alive"	Climie; Fisher; Morgan	4:03
12.	"Mental Block"	Climie; Fisher	4:51
13.	"Never Close the Show"	Climie; Fisher	4:05
14.	"Far Across the Water"	Climie; Fisher	4:24
15.	"Nothing But a Feeling"	Climie; Fisher	3:35
16.	"Climbing Up the Ladder"	Climie; Fisher	4:04
17.	"Love Like a River" (Dance Mix)	Climie; Fisher; Morgan	6:09
18.	"Haunted House"	Climie; Fisher	4:37
Total length:			79:20

== Singles ==
- "Keeping the Mystery Alive" (Germany #35)
- "Rise to the Occasion" [Hip-Hop Mix] (Netherlands #1, South Africa #1, UK #10, Germany #14, Sweden #17)
- "Love Changes (Everything)" (UK #2, South Africa #2, Germany #7, Switzerland #8, Australia #23, USA #23)
- "This Is Me" (UK #22, Netherlands #34, Germany #60)
- "I Won't Bleed for You" (UK #35)

== Personnel ==
Climie Fisher

- Simon Climie – lead vocals and backing vocals
- Rob Fisher – synthesizers and drum machine

Additional musicians

- Neil Taylor – electric guitar
- Pino Palladino – bass
- John Read – bass
- David Palmer – drums
- Steve Ferrone – drums
- Mel Gaynor – drums
- Frank Ricotti – percussion
- Luís Jardim – percussion
- Coral Gordon – backing vocals
- The Soultanas – backing vocals
- View From the Hill – backing vocals
- Kirsty McColl – backing vocals

== Production ==
- Tracks 1–5 produced by Stephen Hague; Track 2 co-produced by Climie Fisher. Recording engineers – Bob Kraushaar and Mike Ging (Track 1); David Jacobs (Tracks 2–5); John Gallen (Track 2). Mixing – Bob Clearmountain (Track 1); Julian Mendelsohn (Track 3).
- Tracks 6–11 produced by Steve Lillywhite. Recording and mix engineers – David Palmer (Tracks 6 & 7); Mark Palmer (Tracks 9–11).

Additional credits

- Recorded at Townhouse Studios, Mayfair Studios, Eel Pie Studios, Advision Studios, Rooster Studios and Sarm West Studios (London, England, UK); Sigma Sound Studios (New York, NY, USA).
- Design – Bill Smith Design
- Photography – Carrie Branovan

== Chart performance ==
Chart (1988)	Peak position
Canada Top Albums/CDs (RPM)	69
Finnish Albums (Suomen virallinen lista)	26
German Albums (Offizielle Top 100)	7
Dutch Albums (Album Top 100)	13
New Zealand Albums (RMNZ)	30
South African Albums (Mediaguide)	1
Swedish Albums (Sverigetopplistan)	14
Swiss Albums (Schweizer Hitparade)	10
UK Albums (Official Charts)	14
US Billboard 200	120

== Certifications ==
Region	Certification	Certified units/sales
United Kingdom (BPI)	Gold	100,000^{^}
^{^} Shipments figures based on certification alone.
