= Never Knew Love (Rick Astley song) =

Single by Rick Astley

from the album Free
- B-side: "So Glad"
- Released: 17 June 1991
- Genre: Pop
- Length: 3:12
- Label: RCA
- Songwriters: John Paul Taylor; Derek Bordeaux
- Producers: Gary Stevenson; Rick Astley

Rick Astley singles chronology
"Move Right Out" (1991)	"Never Knew Love" (1991)	"Wonderful You" (1991)

Music video
- "Never Knew Love" on YouTube

"Never Knew Love" is a song performed by English singer-songwriter Rick Astley and written by Derek Bordeaux and John Paul Taylor. It was produced by Gary Stevenson and Astley. The song was recorded for and included on Astley's third album, Free (1991). It was released on 17 June 1991 by RCA Records and peaked at number 70 on the UK Singles Chart. This song has a saxophone solo by Dan Higgins.

On 14 August 2024, the original music video was upgraded to 4K to celebrate the reissue of Free.

== Track listing ==
1. "Never Knew Love" (remix) – 3:15
2. "Never Knew Love" (The 3 Day mix) – 8:37
3. "So Glad" – 3:28
4. "Some Kinda Love" – 4:35

== Personnel ==
- Rick Astley – lead vocals
- Dave West – acoustic piano, Fender Rhodes, synthesizers, drum programming
- Hywel Maggs – guitars
- Lars Danielsson – bass guitar
- Per Lindval – drum overdubs
- Jacob Andersen – percussion
- Dan Higgins – saxophone solo
- Larry Williams – saxophones
- Bill Reichenbach Jr. – trombone
- Larry Hall – trumpet
- Jerry Hey – brass arrangements
- Anne Dudley – string arrangements and conductor
- Kevin Dorsey – backing vocals
- Carol Kenyon – backing vocals
- Dee Lewis – backing vocals
- Phil Perry – backing vocals

== Charts ==
Chart (1991)	Peak position
Belgium (Ultratop 50 Flanders)	42
UK Singles (Official Charts)	70
UK Airplay (Music Week)	37
