= Promises, Promises (Naked Eyes song) =

Single by Naked Eyes

from the album Burning Bridges
- B-side: "Low Life"; "(What) In the Name of Love"; "A Very Hard Act to Follow"
- Released: 1 April 1983
- Recorded: 1983
- Genre: Synth-pop; new wave
- Length: 3:45 (US version); 4:26 (UK version)
- Label: EMI; EMI America
- Songwriters: Pete Byrne; Rob Fisher
- Producer: Tony Mansfield

Naked Eyes singles chronology
"Voices in My Head" (1983)	"Promises, Promises" (1983)	"When the Lights Go Out" (1983)

"Promises, Promises" is a song by the English new wave and synth-pop band Naked Eyes, released in 1983 as the second single from their debut studio album Burning Bridges. The single went on to become a top-20 hit in the U.S. in October 1983, peaking at number 11 on the Billboard Hot 100 singles chart, although it was re-recorded with lyrics differing from the original UK single.

== Background ==
The song was written by Pete Byrne and Rob Fisher, the core members of Naked Eyes. It follows the band's signature synth-pop sound, characterized by electronic instrumentation, layered melodies, and an upbeat rhythm.

"Promises, Promises" was produced by Tony Mansfield and served as the follow-up to their successful cover of "Always Something There to Remind Me", originally written by Burt Bacharach and Hal David, which had reached the top ten in the U.S. in mid-1983. Although Bacharach and David had also written a song titled "Promises, Promises" for the musical of the same name, the Naked Eyes song is an original work and is unrelated to the Broadway show.

Madonna performed background vocals on the Jellybean 7" and 12" mixes of the song. These versions were not released until 2001 on the compilation album Everything and More.

== Production ==
The track's rhythm section was crafted using the Fairlight CMI, with each drum sound individually programmed and synchronized via a click track. Initially, the band used analog equipment like the Prophet-5 synthesizer and TR-808 drum machine for their demos. However, during studio production, they layered these with digital instruments such as the Fairlight, PPG Wave 2.2, and Synclavier to achieve a clearer and more defined sound. This approach minimized the muddiness often associated with multitracking analog synths, particularly in the bass frequencies. The meticulous integration of these technologies resulted in the distinctive sound of "Promises, Promises".

== Personnel ==
- Pete Byrne – vocals
- Rob Fisher – keyboards
- Tony Mansfield – guitars
- John Read – bass
- Phil Towner – drums

== Chart performance ==
=== Weekly charts ===
Chart (1983)	Peak Position
Canada Top Singles (RPM)	13
New Zealand (Recorded Music NZ)	15
South Africa (Springbok)	29
UK Singles (Official Charts)	95
US Billboard Hot 100	11
US Dance Music/Club Play Singles (Billboard)	32
US Adult Contemporary (Billboard)	19
US Cash Box Top 100	12
US Radio and Records Contemporary Hit Radio	8

=== Year-end charts ===
Chart (1983)	Position
U.S. Billboard Hot 100	64
U.S. Cash Box	76
