= Waiting for the Redbird =

Studio album by Easterhouse
- Released: 1989
- Genre: Rock
- Label: Rough Trade
- Producer: Steve Power, Steve Lovell

Easterhouse chronology
Inspiration EP (1986)	Waiting for the Redbird (1989)

Waiting for the Redbird is the second and final album by the English band Easterhouse, released in 1989. "Come Out Fighting" peaked at No. 7 on Billboard's Modern Rock Tracks chart and was heard on several American sports television shows. The album peaked at No. 18 on the UK Independent Albums Chart.

== Production ==
The album was produced by Steve Power and Steve Lovell. Frontman Andy Perry was the only returning bandmember, forcing him to use studio musicians, including Neil Taylor. "Stay with Me (Death on the Dole)" is about two teenagers who kill themselves rather than continue their dole-supported lives.

== Critical reception ==
Professional ratings
Review scores
Source	Rating
AllMusic	1.5/5 stars
Chicago Tribune	3/4 stars
The Great Indie Discography	7/10
Los Angeles Times	1.5/4 stars
The Ottawa Citizen	3/5 stars
The Rolling Stone Album Guide	3/5 stars
The Virgin Encyclopedia of 80s Music	2/5 stars

The Toronto Star said that Perry "delivers an evermore slick, stodgy affair that combines mildly engaging melodies, sophomoric instrumentation and a lush lead vocal contrasted severely with 50-lb sledgehammer lyrics." The Ottawa Citizen noted that Perry "has adopted the modus operandi of many Christian musicians: keep the crusade intact—the form of the music carrying it out is incidental." The Los Angeles Times opined that while his "art 'n' soul is thematically in the right, Left-of-centre place, the entire vainglorious project collapses under the irony-poor bloody weight of all the musical and lyrical cliches."

The Chicago Tribune stated that "the sleek production (atmospheric synthesizers and danceable bass lines) gives the weighty political messages a buoyant urgency." The Hartford Courant likened the album's music to Simple Minds, the Psychedelic Furs, and Tears for Fears. The Independent said that Perry "suffers from severe Bonoid delusions... this is real moaning-minnie music, the kind which allows no imaginative input whatsoever on the part of the listener." The Santa Cruz Sentinel called the songs "models of rock composition."

== Track listing ==
No.	Title	Length
1.	"Waiting for the Redbird"
2.	"You're Gonna Miss It (When It's Gone)"
3.	"Stay with Me (Death on the Dole)"
4.	"Come Out Fighting"
5.	"America"
6.	"Hope and Glory"
7.	"Say Yes"
8.	"This Country"
9.	"Sweatshop"
