= Free (Rick Astley album) =

Studio album by Rick Astley
- Released: 18 February 1991
- Recorded: 1990
- Length: 48:24
- Label: RCA
- Producers: Gary Stevenson; Rick Astley

Rick Astley chronology
Dance Mixes (1990)	Free (1991)	Body & Soul (1993)

Singles from Free
- 1. "Cry for Help" Released: 14 January 1991; 2. "Move Right Out" Released: 18 March 1991; 3. "Never Knew Love" Released: 17 June 1991

Free is the third studio album by English singer Rick Astley, released on 18 February 1991 by RCA Records. It was his first album not to be produced by the noted production team of Stock Aitken Waterman. It gave Astley another hit single in the ballad "Cry for Help", which became a Top 10 hit in both the UK and US. Further singles "Move Right Out" and "Never Knew Love" were less successful. Free reached the UK Top 10 and the US Top 40 and marked the end of a successful four-year period for Astley.

Professional ratings
Review scores
Source	Rating
AllMusic	1.5/5 stars
Encyclopedia of Popular Music	3/5 stars
MSN Music	1/5 stars
NME	3/10
Rolling Stone	2/5 stars
The Vancouver Sun	3/5 stars

== Track listing ==
=== Original release ===
No.	Title	Writer(s)	Length
1.	"In the Name of Love"	Michael McDonald; Edward Sanford	4:27
2.	"Cry for Help"	Rick Astley; Rob Fisher	4:54
3.	"Move Right Out"	Astley; Fisher	3:50
4.	"Be with You"	Astley; Mark King	4:07
5.	"Really Got a Problem"	Astley; King	4:15
6.	"Is This Really Love?†"	Astley	3:26
7.	"This Must Be Heaven"	Nicky Brown; Jeffrey Cohen; John Lind	4:42
8.	"Never Knew Love"	Derek Bordeaux; John Paul Taylor	3:07
9.	"The Bottom Line"	Astley	5:13
10.	"Wonderful You"	Astley	5:08
11.	"Behind the Smile"	Astley	4:33
Total length:			48:24

Japanese release
No.	Title	Writer(s)	Length
10.	"Some Kinda Love "	Astley	4:30
11.	"Wonderful You"	Astley	5:08
12.	"Behind the Smile"	Astley	4:33
Total length:			52:48

Note

- † Not on LP PL74896

=== 2010 reissue ===
On 3 May 2010 an expanded edition of Free was released in a package containing both newly expanded and remastered editions of Free and Body and Soul.

Free... Plus bonus tracks
No.	Title	Writer(s)	Length
12.	"Some Kinda Love"	Astley	4:27
13.	"So Glad"	Astley	3:24
14.	"Cry for Help" (single edit)	Astley; Fisher	4:19
15.	"Move Right Out" (7" version)	Astley; Fisher	3:55
16.	"Never Knew Love" (7" remix)	Bordeaux; Taylor	3:07
17.	"Cry for Help" (12" version)	Astley; Fisher	6:27
18.	"Move Right Out" (vox, piano, strings mix)	Astley; Fisher	3:38

=== 2024 remaster ===
A remastered edition of the album was released on 30 August 2024, including a double CD album with a reimagined version of "Cry for Help" on the CD1 from his compilation album The Best of Me, also included with B-sides, instrumentals, and remixes for the CD2 and an LP vinyl.

2024 remastered edition disc 1 bonus tracks
No.	Title	Writer(s)	Length
12.	"Cry for Help" (reimagined)	Astley; Fisher	3:50
13.	"Some Kinda Love"	Astley	4:24
14.	"So Glad" (demo)	Astley	3:22
15.	"Call Me"	Astley	4:02
16.	"Move Right Out" (vox, piano, strings mix)	Astley; Fisher	3:35

2024 remastered edition disc 2
No.	Title	Writer(s)	Length
1.	"Cry for Help" (7" version)	Astley; Fisher	4:20
2.	"Move Right Out" (7" version)	Astley; Fisher	3:53
3.	"Never Knew Love" (7" version)	Bordeaux; Taylor	3:06
4.	"Cry for Help" (single edit)	Astley; Fisher	4:05
5.	"Move Right Out" (Rick's mix)	Astley; Fisher	3:53
6.	"In the Name of Love" (Arty Olive mix)	McDonald; Sanford	4:20
7.	"Cry for Help" (12" version)	Astley; Fisher	6:27
8.	"Move Right Out" (12" version)	Astley; Fisher	6:34
9.	"Never Knew Love" (3 Day mix)	Bordeaux; Taylor	8:35
10.	"Move Right Out" (instrumental)	Astley; Fisher	3:52
11.	"Never Knew Love" (instrumental)	Bordeaux; Taylor	3:10
12.	"This Must Be Heaven" (instrumental)	Brown; Cohen; Lind	4:46
13.	"Call Me" (instrumental)	Astley	4:00

== Personnel ==
=== Musicians ===
- Rick Astley – lead and backing vocals
- Dave West – synthesizers (1–8), drum programming (1, 4, 5, 7, 8), acoustic piano (2, 5, 6, 8), organ (2, 3, 7), Fender Rhodes (2, 8, 9)
- Rob Fisher – acoustic piano (3)
- Nichlas Medin – acoustic piano (4, 7, 9)
- Henrik Nilson – organ (4, 9)
- Elton John – acoustic piano (10, 11)
- Paul Halberg – guitars (1)
- Hywel Maggs – guitars (2–5, 7, 8)
- Robert Ahwai – guitars (3, 9, 10)
- Gene Black – guitars (6)
- Lars Danielsson – bass guitar (3, 8)
- Mark King – bass guitar (4)
- Neil Stubenhaus – bass guitar (5)
- Niels-Henning Ørsted Pedersen – double bass (9, 10)
- Jacob Andersen – Latin percussion (1–3, 5–8)
- Vinnie Colaiuta – drums (2, 6)
- Per Lindval – drums (3, 9, 10), drum overdubs (4–8)
- Anne Dudley – string arrangements and conductor (1–3, 8, 10, 11)
- Jerry Hey – brass arrangements (3, 4, 6, 8, 9)
- Larry Williams – saxophone (3, 4, 6, 8, 9)
- Dan Higgins – saxophone solo (5, 8, 10)
- Bill Reichenbach, Jr. – trombone (3, 4, 6, 8, 9)
- Larry Hall – trumpet (3, 4, 6, 8, 9)
- Kevin Dorsey – backing vocals (1, 8, 10)
- Michael McDonald – backing vocals (1)
- Phil Perry – backing vocals (1, 8, 10)
- The Andraé Crouch Choir – backing vocals (2)
- Carol Kenyon – backing vocals (3, 6–9)
- Dee Lewis – backing vocals (3, 5–9)

=== Production ===
- Producers – Rick Astley and Gary Stevenson
- Engineers – Gary Stevenson and Henrik Nilson
- Assistant engineers – Andy Baker, Allan Krohn and Craig Portells
- Mixing – Ren Swan
- Art direction – Rick Astley
- Sleeve design – Mike Orr and the Broughton Design Group
- Photography – Paul Cox
- Management – Tony Henderson

== Charts ==
=== Weekly charts ===
Weekly chart performance for Free
Chart (1991)	Peak position
Australian Albums (ARIA)	20
Austrian Albums (Ö3 Austria)	24
Dutch Albums (Album Top 100)	23
German Albums (Offizielle Top 100)	8
Italian Albums (Musica e dischi)	18
Swedish Albums (Sverigetopplistan)	16
Swiss Albums (Schweizer Hitparade)	26
UK Albums (Official Charts)	9
US Billboard 200	31

=== Year-end charts ===
Year-end chart performance for Free
Chart (1991)	Position
German Albums (Offizielle Top 100)	71

== Certifications and sales ==
Certifications and sales for Free
Region	Certification	Certified units/sales
Spain (Promusicae)	Gold	50,000^{^}
United Kingdom (BPI)	Gold	100,000^{^}
^{^} Shipments figures based on certification alone.
