= Contenders (album) =

Studio album by Easterhouse
- Released: 1986
- Genre: Rock
- Label: Rough Trade; Columbia

Easterhouse chronology
In Our Own Hands EP (1985)	Contenders (1986)	Inspiration EP (1986)

Contenders is the debut album by the English band Easterhouse, released in 1986.

The album peaked at No. 91 on the UK Albums Chart.

== Production ==
The album's songs were cowritten by brothers Andy and Ivor Perry; many reflect the band's support for the Revolutionary Communist Party. Contenders was Easterhouse's only album that included their original lineup.

== Critical reception ==
Professional ratings
Review scores
Source	Rating
AllMusic	3/5 stars
Robert Christgau	B
The Encyclopedia of Popular Music	3/5 stars
The Philadelphia Inquirer	1/4 stars
The Rolling Stone Album Guide	3/5 stars

Robert Christgau deemed the album "mostly uniform arena-jangle." Trouser Press thought that "the music is both melodic and muscular, lending authority to Andy's regret-tinged broadsides." The Los Angeles Times called Easterhouse "a dyed-in-the-wool guitar band [that] sports a big, messy, passionate sound that layers lots of shining guitar lines over incessant, often monochromatic rhythms." The Philadelphia Inquirer opined that the "well-intentioned English leftist Easterhouse makes unappealing propaganda with florid images ... stentorian vocals and turgid melodies."

The New York Times opined that Contenders "offers a thoughtful critique of Britain's Labor Party, charging that it sold out working peoples' interest when in power and doesn't offer a viable alternative to Thatcherism... The music, all barbed-wire guitars and rolling rhythms, isn't as doctrinaire as the lyrics; it's frequently compelling." Spin concluded that "the band generates an atmosphere of mysticism that puts Easterhouse closer in spirit to the melancholy of Joy Division than the Revolution Rock postures of the Clash or their acolytes." The Sydney Morning Herald stated: "True, you'd hide from these serious young men at a party, but their intensity helps make this one of the most inspirational debut LPs of the year."

AllMusic wrote that "Perry's voice is buried beneath the mix; consequently, his political lyrics are not always intelligible, draining them of the power they probably had on paper." The Rolling Stone Album Guide thought that "the band's hardline leftist politics ... are about the only thing that makes them distinctive."

== Track listing ==
No.	Title	Length
1.	"Out on Your Own"
2.	"Whistling in the Dark"
3.	"Nineteen Sixty Nine"
4.	"Cargo of Souls"
5.	"Lenin in Zurich"
6.	"Get Back to Russia"
7.	"To Live Like This"
8.	"The Boy Can Sing"
9.	"Estates"
10.	"Inspiration"
11.	"Easter Rising"
12.	"Johnny I Hardly Knew You"
