= Keep It Turned On =

Studio album by Rick Astley
- Released: 3 December 2001
- Recorded: November 2000 – September 2001
- Genre: Dance-pop
- Length: 39:48
- Labels: Polydor; Cruz
- Producers: Sound Proof; Wayne Wilkins; Gary Stevenson; Ben Robbins; Chris Braide

Rick Astley chronology
Together Forever – Greatest Hits and More... (2000)	Keep It Turned On (2001)	Greatest Hits (2002)

Singles from Keep It Turned On
- 1. "Sleeping" Released: 1 October 2001; 2. "Keep It Turned On" Released: 27 February 2002

Professional ratings
Review scores
Source	Rating
AllMusic	2.5/5 stars

Keep It Turned On is the fifth studio album by English singer Rick Astley, as well as the first after an eight-year hiatus of his career. It was released in Germany on 3 December 2001. The album reached number 56 on the German Albums Chart. It was his first studio album since 1993's Body & Soul following a long hiatus from music. Because the album was not released in the UK, "Sleeping" and "Full of You" have appeared on several of his compilation albums, as 'new' tracks.

== Track listing ==
All tracks are written by Rick Astley and Chris Braide, except where noted.

No.	Title	Writer(s)	Length
1.	"Sleeping"		3:42
2.	"Wanna Believe You"	Astley	3:44
3.	"What You See Is What You Don't Get"		3:24
4.	"Breathe"	Astley; Bob Dipero	3:59
5.	"One Night Stand"		4:08
6.	"Don't Ask"		4:14
7.	"Keep It Turned On"		3:48
8.	"Romeo Loves Juliet"	Astley	3:41
9.	"Let's Go Out Tonight"		3:44
10.	"Full of You"	Astley	4:27
11.	"Miracle"	Astley; Andrew Frampton	4:20
Total length:			39:48

== Personnel ==
- Rick Astley – lead and backing vocals, keyboards, programming, guitars
- Chris Braide – keyboards, acoustic piano, programming, guitars, backing vocals
- Richard Cottle – keyboards
- Ernie McKone – keyboards, programming, bass
- Ben Robbins – keyboards, programming
- Dave West – keyboards, programming
- Wayne Wilkins – keyboards, programming
- Greg Bone – guitars
- Anthony Clark – guitars
- Mark Jaimes – guitars, bass
- Anthony King – guitars
- Simon Hill – drums
- Beverley Skeete – backing vocals
