= Climie Fisher =

British pop duo (1986–1990)

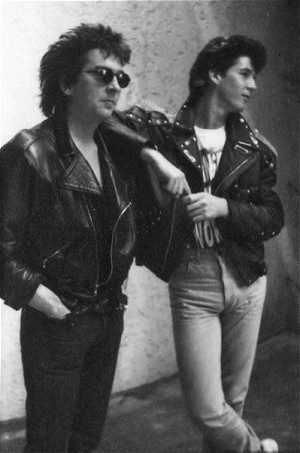
- Rob Fisher (left) and Simon Climie at the Montreux Pop Festival in Switzerland, 1988

Background information
- Origin: London, England
- Genre: Pop
- Years active: 1986–1990
- Labels: EMI, Capitol (US)
- Past members: Simon Climie; Rob Fisher

Climie Fisher were a British pop duo formed by vocalist Simon Climie and former Naked Eyes keyboardist Rob Fisher. In 1987–1988, they had two international hit singles: "Rise to the Occasion" and "Love Changes (Everything)".

== Career ==
Simon Climie and Rob Fisher met at Abbey Road Studios, where they were both performing as session musicians. The duo is best known for the 1987 hit single "Love Changes (Everything)" which won an Ivor Novello Award. It reached number 67 in the UK and, after a remix and re-released, number 2 in the UK, 12 in New Zealand, 24 in Australia, 7 in Germany, 8 in Switzerland, 15 in Austria and 23 in the US, all in 1988.

The hip hop-styled remix of "Rise to the Occasion" was originally conceived as a niche dance version by remixers Phil Harding and Ian Curnow, but was chosen by the band's record company as the main single mix. "The style of it comes from a rap track," explained Harding. "We never thought the record company would put it out as the main record — we never really found out what Climie Fisher thought of their main version being ditched." The track reached number 10 in the UK Singles Chart, and later reached number 1 in South Africa, number 6 in Belgium, number 14 in Germany, number 17 in Sweden and number 19 in Austria.

Their last major hit single was "Love Like a River" in 1989, which reached number 18 in Austria, number 22 in the UK and number 54 in Germany. They wrote most of their own material together with Dennis Morgan, who Climie had previously worked with; and hired Steve Lillywhite and Stephen Hague as producers. Although their first album Everything charted in both the UK (number 14) and US (number 120), their second album Coming In for the Kill (UK number 35) was less successful and they split up shortly after its release.

Fisher later co-wrote Rick Astley's song "Cry for Help" (UK Singles Chart number 7 in 1991). He also contributed as songwriter to Astley's albums Free (1991) and Body & Soul (1993). Fisher died on 25 August 1999 during surgery for bowel cancer.

Climie had, before the success of Climie Fisher, co-written (with Dennis Morgan) the George Michael/Aretha Franklin single "I Knew You Were Waiting (For Me)" in 1986. He worked as a producer for recording artists such as Louise, MN8 and Five Star and as a co-songwriter and musician for Eric Clapton, including the album with J. J. Cale (featuring Derek Trucks and Billy Preston), The Road to Escondido. Climie released a solo album and single, both titled "Soul Inspiration" in 1992. He also worked with former Doobie Brothers member Michael McDonald on his Motown albums. He produced the 2009 album The Distance by Taylor Hicks an American Idol winner.

== In popular culture ==
The folk pastiche Ballad of Climie Fisher by the band Half Man Half Biscuit on their album Trouble Over Bridgwater is a fictional tale of what happened to the pair post break-up.

== Discography ==
=== Studio albums ===
| Title | Release | Peak chart positions | | | | | | Certifications |
| Title | Release | UK | GER | SA | SWE | SWI | US | Certifications |
|---|---|---|---|---|---|---|---|---|
| Everything | Released: 1 February 1988; Label: EMI; Formats: CD, cassette, LP | 14 | 7 | 1 | 14 | 10 | 120 | BPI: Gold |
| Coming In for the Kill | Released: 9 October 1989; Label: EMI; Formats: CD, cassette, LP | 35 | — | 6 | 36 | — | — | |
"—" denotes a recording that did not chart or was not released in that territory.

=== Compilation albums ===
- Keep It Special EP (1988)
- Twice as Much (1992)
- The Best of Climie Fisher (1996)
- Premium Gold Collection (2000)
- Love Changes Everything (2020)

=== Singles ===
| Title | Year | Peak chart positions | | | | | | | | | | Certifications | Album |
| Title | Year | UK | AUS | AUT | BE | GER | IRE | NL | NZ | SA | US | Certifications | Album |
|---|---|---|---|---|---|---|---|---|---|---|---|---|---|
| "This Is Me" | 1986 | 106 | – | – | – | – | – | – | – | – | – | | Everything |
| "Keeping the Mystery Alive" | 1987 | 183 | – | – | 29 | 35 | – | 30 | – | – | – | | Everything |
| "Love Changes (Everything)" | 1987 | 67 | – | – | – | 35 | – | – | – | – | – | RMNZ: Gold | Everything |
| "Rise to the Occasion" | 1987 | 10 | – | 19 | 6 | 14 | 9 | 1 | – | 1 | – | | Everything |
| "Love Changes (Everything)" (remix) | 1988 | 2 | 23 | 15 | – | 7 | 4 | – | 12 | 2 | 23 | BPI: Silver | Everything |
| "This Is Me" (reissue) | 1988 | 22 | 128 | – | 26 | 60 | 12 | 34 | 43 | – | – | | Everything |
| "I Won't Bleed for You" | 1988 | 35 | 124 | – | – | – | – | – | – | – | – | | Everything |
| "Love Like a River" | 1988 | 22 | – | 18 | – | 54 | 16 | – | – | – | – | | Non-album single |
| "Facts of Love" | 1989 | 50 | – | – | – | 54 | – | – | – | – | – | | Coming In for the Kill |
| "Fire on the Ocean" | 1989 | 89 | – | – | – | – | – | – | – | – | – | | Coming In for the Kill |
| "It's Not Supposed to Be That Way" | 1990 | 77 | – | – | – | – | – | – | – | – | – | | Coming In for the Kill |
"–" denotes releases that did not chart or were not released in that territory.
