= Summer Lovin' (song) =

Single by Musikk Featuring John Rock
- Released: 2004
- Recorded: 2004
- Genre: Pop
- Length: 3:28
- Label: EMI Music
- Songwriter(s): Jesper Green, Paw Lagermann, Jon Nørgaard, Lina Rafn, Mikkel Torsting.

Musikk singles chronology
"Get Serious 2003" (2003)	"Summer Lovin'" (2004)	"Love Changes (Everything)" (2004)

John Rock singles chronology
"Endlessly" (2003)	"Summer Lovin'" (2004)	"Love Changes (Everything)" (2004)

"Summer Lovin'" is a single by house music duo Musikk. It was released in 2004 as a digital download. The song peaked at number 7 on the Danish Singles Chart. It features vocals from Danish singer Jon Nørgaard under the name John Rock. The song was also recorded in Simlish for some foreign language versions of The Sims 2: Nightlife.

== Track listing ==
Digital download

1. "Summer Lovin'" (Original Radio Edit) - 3:28
2. "Summer Lovin'" (INF:RMX Radio Edit) - 3:33
3. "Summer Lovin'" (Donnie Brasco Remix) - 3:53
4. "Summer Lovin'" (Original Club Mix) - 5:13
5. "Summer Lovin'" (INF:RMX Club Mix) - 6:27
6. "Summer Lovin'" (Donnie Brasco Vocal Club Mix) - 9:32
7. "Summer Lovin'" (Jake Wattson Indian Summer Mix) - 6:10
8. "Summer Lovin'" (Monday Morning Mix) - 7:21
9. "Summer Lovin'" (Donnie Brasco Vocal Dub Mix) - 9:32
10. "Summer Lovin'" (Instrumental) - 3:26
11. "Summer Lovin'" (Acapella 1) - 3:29
12. "Summer Lovin'" (Acapella 2) - 3:29

== Chart performance ==
Chart (2004)	Peak position
Denmark (Tracklisten)	7

== Release history ==
Region	Date	Format
Denmark	2004	Digital download
United Kingdom	2004	Digital download
