= Easterhouse (band) =

English rock band

- Origin: Stretford, England
- Genre: Indie rock
- Years active: 1982–1989, 2005
- Labels: Rough Trade; Columbia
- Past members: Andy Perry; Ivor Perry; Peter Vanden; Gary Rostock; Mike Murray; Dave Verner; Steve Lovell; Lance Sabin; Neil Taylor; Sean Keaney; Richard Duddle; Mike Murray; Drew Smith

Easterhouse was an English indie rock group from the mid to late 1980s, known for jangly guitars and leftist political leaning.

== History ==
Named after the Easterhouse area of Glasgow, the band was formed in Stretford, near Manchester by Ivor Perry and Andy Perry, intrigued by communism and inspired by Bob Marley's direct delivery of political content, was invited to join the band in order to improve its lyrical content. Perry's political stance reflected the perspectives of the then active Revolutionary Communist Party, with particular regard to Irish politics. Easterhouse played one of their first gigs on 30 August 1983 at Dingwalls in London as the support band for The Smiths after Ivor Perry convinced Morrissey to let them have the opening spot. Their Rough Trade singles "Whistling in the Dark" and "Inspiration" were both Top 5 independent chart hits. Their energetic first album, Contenders, featuring their signature song, "Nineteen Sixty Nine," has been compared to The Chameleons, New Model Army, and The Smiths. In July 1986, Easterhouse participated in the Festival of the Tenth Summer.

After Contenders, Ivor left the band; by the time second album Waiting for the Redbird was released in 1989, Andy Perry was the sole remaining member of the original line-up. It produced a minor hit, "Come Out Fighting", which had significant airplay in the US, and spawned a Justin Strauss remix version of the same song.

In 2005 the band reunited for a one-off gig, featuring Andy Rourke (ex-bassist, The Smiths).

== Post-band activities ==
Ivor Perry formed The Cradle with Rostock and Craig Gannon a musical contributor to The Smiths. The band had a number 12 indie chart hit with "It's Too High" in 1987, but the band was put on hold when Johnny Marr left The Smiths. Perry was considered to replace Marr, and recorded some new material with the band, including an early version of "Bengali in Platforms" that was originally intended as the B-side of which is "Stop Me If You Think You've Heard This One Before", and later appeared on Morrissey's first album, Viva Hate. Perry was uncomfortable with the situation, stating "it was like they wanted another Johnny Marr", and the sessions ended with (according to Perry) "Morrissey running out of the studio". Perry instead resurrected Cradle with new singer Craig Davies, but when Davies signed a solo deal with Rough Trade Records, the rest of the band were dropped by the label. The band continued with another singer.

Ivor Perry subsequently recorded further records including the Third Wave with Arabian Sugar on the Freak Beats Compilation & Parchman which signed to XL / Citybeat and appeared on SNUB TV in 1991 and whose albums were re-released digitally by Beggars Banquet in 2013. Now Ivor Perry has a new band playing modern instrumental rock under the name bigflower :https://bigflower.bandcamp.com/

Gary Rostock played drums on Buzzcocks' Steve Diggle's 2000 album Some Reality. He relocated to the Czech Republic and releases electronic ambient and electronica.

== Personnel ==
=== Original line-up ===
- Andy Perry - vocals, harmonica
- Ivor Perry - guitar
- Peter Vanden - bass guitar
- Gary Rostock - drums
- Mike Murray - rhythm guitar

=== Other members ===
- Dave Verner - drums
- Steve Lovell - guitar
- Lance Sabin - guitar
- Neil Taylor - guitar

=== Third incarnation ===
- Sean Keaney - drums
- Richard Duddle - guitar
- Mike Murray - guitar
- Drew Smith - bass guitar

== Discography ==
=== Albums ===
- Contenders (1986), Rough Trade – UK #91, UK Indie #3
- Waiting for the Redbird (1989), Rough Trade/Columbia – UK Indie #18

=== Singles and EPs ===
- In Our Own Hands EP (1985), London – UK Indie #13
- "Whistling in the Dark" (1986), Rough Trade/Columbia – UK Indie #2
- "Inspiration" (1986), Rough Trade – UK Indie #5
- "Come Out Fighting" (1989), Rough Trade/Columbia – UK Indie #18, AUS #66, US #82, US MOD #5
- "You're Gonna Miss It (When It's Gone)" (1989), Rough Trade
