= Sleeping (Rick Astley song) =

Single by Rick Astley

from the album Keep It Turned On
- B-side: "Sleeping" remixes
- Released: 1 October 2001
- Recorded: 2000–2001
- Genre: Dance-pop
- Length: 3:43
- Label: Polydor; Cruz
- Songwriters: Rick Astley; Chris Braide
- Producers: Chris Braide; Rick Astley

Rick Astley singles chronology
"The Ones You Love" (1993)	"Sleeping" (2001)	"Keep It Turned On" (2002)

"Sleeping" is a song performed by English singer-songwriter Rick Astley. It was written and produced by Chris Braide and Astley in 2001. The song was Astley's first single in almost eight years, released in Germany only. Its first UK appearance was on the 2002 Greatest Hits compilation. The song is also the first single from his fifth studio album, Keep It Turned On. It reached the top 75 of the singles charts in Germany and Switzerland.

== Track listing ==
CD single jewel case

1. "Sleeping" (radio edit) – 3:43
2. "Sleeping" (Tee's radio mix) – 3:58
3. "Sleeping" (TNT radio mix) – 3:55
4. "Sleeping" (UK radio mix) – 3:52
5. "Sleeping" (Tiefschwarz Wake Up mix) – 6:42
6. "Sleeping" (Tee's Freeze radio mix) – 3:55
7. "Sleeping" (Tee's extended mix) – 5:58
8. "Sleeping" (Hifi Crash remix 2) – 6:27

CD single card cover

1. "Sleeping" (radio edit) – 3:43
2. "Sleeping" (Tee's radio mix) – 3:58

12" vinyl (The Club Mixes) Special Limited Edition

1. "Sleeping" (Inhouse mix) – 7:09
2. "Sleeping" (a cappella) – 3:28
3. "Sleeping" (Tee's dub) – 7:39
4. "Sleeping" (Hifi Crash remix 1) – 6:42

12" vinyl (The Club Mixes) [DJ only]

1. "Sleeping" (Tee's Freeze mix) – 7:36
2. "Sleeping" (Tee's UK mix) – 7:31
3. "Sleeping" (Tiefschwarz Wake Up mix) – 6:42
4. "Sleeping" (Tiefschwarz dub) – 6:42
5. "Sleeping" (Tee's extended mix) – 5:58
6. "Sleeping" (Hifi Crash remix 2) – 6:27

== Charts ==
Chart (2001)	Peak position
Germany (GfK)	60
Switzerland (Schweizer Hitparade)	69

== Cover versions ==
- The song was covered in 2008 by Randy Jones, a former integrant of the Village People.
