= The Ones You Love =

1993 single by Rick Astley

Single by Rick Astley

from the album Body & Soul
- B-side: "Cry for Help"
- Released: 23 August 1993
- Genre: Pop; adult contemporary; blue-eyed soul
- Length: 7:13
- Label: RCA
- Songwriters: Rick Astley; Dave West
- Producers: Gary Stevenson; Rick Astley

Rick Astley singles chronology
"Hopelessly" (1993)	"The Ones You Love" (1993)	"Sleeping" (2001)

Music video
- "The Ones You Love" on YouTube

"The Ones You Love" is a song performed by English singer-songwriter Rick Astley, written by Astley and Dave West. It was produced by Gary Stevenson and Astley, and recorded for the singer's fourth album, Body & Soul (1993). The song was released as the album's final single on 23 August 1993 by RCA Records and peaked at number 48 on the UK Singles Chart. After its release, Astley retired from music, and "The Ones You Love" served as his final single until the release of "Sleeping" in October 2001.

== Critical reception ==
Upon the single release, Larry Flick from Billboard magazine wrote, "Astley digs into his pretty Body & Soul album and pulls out this gospel-spiced pop ballad. Tambourine-shaking, choir-bolstered chorus is enhanced by mindful lyrics on getting past the tougher moments in life. Astley's vocal is a pleasure. His restrained performance keeps the song from becoming too cloying or heavy-handed. Fine for either top 40 or AC play." Alan Jones from Music Week gave the song three out of five, describing it as "cheerful, uptempo and commercial, though far inferior to his last hit "Cry for Help" which is included here [on the single]."

== Track listing ==
1. "The Ones You Love" (single edit) – 4:20
2. "Cry for Help" (single edit) – 4:14
3. "The Ones You Love" (instrumental) – 4:21

== Personnel ==
- Rick Astley – lead vocals
- Dave West – keyboards, bass, drum programming
- Mark Brzezicki – live drums
- Derek Green – backing vocals
- Paul "T.J." Lee – backing vocals
- Beverley Skeete – backing vocals

== Charts ==
Chart (1993–1994)	Peak position
Australia (ARIA)	132
Canada Top Singles (RPM)	54
Europe (European Hit Radio)	16
Germany (GfK)	54
Netherlands (Dutch Top 40)	12
Netherlands (Single Top 100)	4
UK Singles (Official Charts)	48
UK Airplay (ERA)	45
US Adult Contemporary (Billboard)	19
