= Fuel for the Fire (Naked Eyes album) =

Studio album by Naked Eyes
- Released: September 1984
- Recorded: 1984
- Genres: New wave; synth-pop
- Length: 40:02
- Labels: Parlophone; EMI America (North America)
- Producers: Tony Mansfield; Arthur Baker

Naked Eyes chronology
Burning Bridges (1983)	Fuel for the Fire (1984)	Fumbling with the Covers (2007)

Singles from Fuel for the Fire
- 1. "(What) In the Name of Love" Released: 11 August 1984

Professional ratings
Review scores
Source	Rating
AllMusic	2/5 stars

Fuel for the Fire is the second studio album by the English new wave and synth-pop duo Naked Eyes, released in 1984. The band had top 40 success with the first single off the album, "(What) In the Name of Love", produced by Arthur Baker, which reached No. 39 in the US on the Billboard Hot 100, and in a remix by Baker, No. 35 on the Dance chart. The album peaked at No. 83 on the Billboard Top 200 Albums chart.

While a modest hit, it had not matched the commercial and critical success of their debut; in their home country of the UK, neither the album nor its single had charted. Baker remixed another track he had produced for the duo, "Sacrifice", but the record company never released a follow-up to the top 40 lead single and Naked Eyes disbanded following the underwhelming reception.

The album was released for the first time on CD in 2013 by Cherry Red Records.

== Track listing ==
All tracks are written by Pete Byrne and Rob Fisher.

No.	Title	Length
1.	"(What) In the Name of Love"	4:27
2.	"New Hearts"	3:38
3.	"Sacrifice"	4:08
4.	"Eyes of a Child"	3:36
5.	"Once Is Enough"	4:11
6.	"No Flowers Please"	4:02
7.	"Answering Service"	3:45
8.	"Me I See in You"	3:35
9.	"Flying Solo"	4:31
10.	"Flag of Convenience"	4:09
Total length:		40:02

== Personnel ==
Naked Eyes

- Pete Byrne – lead vocals
- Rob Fisher – keyboards, Fairlight programming, LinnDrum programming

Additional musicians

- Ira Siegel – guitars (1, 3)
- Tony Mansfield – guitars (2, 4–10)
- John Read – bass
- Frank Valardi – drums (1, 3)
- Graham Broad – drums (2, 4–10)
- Tina Baker – backing vocals
- Cindy Mizelle – backing vocals
- Wendell Morrison – backing vocals
- Audrey Wheeler – backing vocals

Production

- Producers – Arthur Baker (1, 3); Tony Mansfield (2, 4–10).
- Engineers – Jay Burnett (1, 3); Hadyn Bendall (2, 4–10).
- Mastered by Greg Fulginiti at Sterling Sound (New York, NY).
- Art direction – Henry Marquez
- Design – Michael Diehl
- Photography – Gavin Cochrane

== Charts ==
Chart performance for Fuel for the Fire
Chart (1984)	Peak position
US Billboard 200	83
