= Wonderful You (song) =

Single by Rick Astley

from the album Free
- Released: 1991
- Recorded: 1991
- Genre: Pop
- Length: 4:13
- Label: RCA
- Songwriter: Rick Astley
- Producer: Rick Astley/Gary Stevenson

Rick Astley singles chronology
"Never Knew Love" (1991)	"Wonderful You" (1991)	"Hopelessly" (1993)

"Wonderful You" is a single by the English pop-soul singer Rick Astley, taken from his album Free and was released in 1991 as a promo single.

== Track listing ==
1. Wonderful You (Single Edit) - 4:13
2. Wonderful You (Album Version) - 5:12

== Personnel ==
- Rick Astley – lead vocals
- Elton John – acoustic piano
- Robert Ahwai – guitars
- Niels-Henning Ørsted Pedersen – double bass
- Per Lindval – drums
- Dan Higgins – saxophone solo
- Anne Dudley – string arrangements and conductor
- Kevin Dorsey – backing vocals
- Phil Perry – backing vocals
