= Fuel for the Fire (band) =

- Origin: Peterborough, England, UK
- Genres: rock
- Years active: 2004-present
- Members: Steven Chapman; Martyn Hilliam; Simon Dunkling; Matt Locke; Ross Craib
- Website: www.fuel-music.com

Fuel for the Fire are a five-piece English rock band from Peterborough, England. Formed in 2004, the band consists of Steven Chapman on lead vocals, Martyn Hilliam on guitar, Simon Dunkling on Bass, Matt Locke on keyboards and Ross Craib on Drums.

2010 saw the band attract major industry attention through being one of the main prize winners in the final of Live and Unsigned 2010 held at London's O2.

On the back of this performance and the strength of debut EP The Lost Art of the Mixtape, the band have attracted attention from multiple record labels and been featured by the music media including NME.com, Muzu.tv and BBC radio amongst others.
