= Love Changes (Everything) =

1987 single by Climie Fisher

Single by Climie Fisher

from the album Everything
- B-side: "Never Close the Show"
- Released: 3 August 1987
- Length: 4:30
- Label: EMI
- Songwriters: Simon Climie; Rob Fisher; Dennis Morgan
- Producer: Stephen Hague

Climie Fisher singles chronology
"Keeping the Mystery Alive" (1987)	"Love Changes (Everything)" (1987)	"Rise to the Occasion" (1987)
"Rise to the Occasion" (1987)	"Love Changes (Everything)" (1988)	"This Is Me" (1988)

Music video
- "Love Changes Everything" on YouTube

"Love Changes (Everything)" is a 1987 single by British pop duo Climie Fisher that gained international success after a re-release in 1988. The song was later covered and released by house music duo Musikk. Songwriters Simon Climie, Dennis Morgan and Rob Fisher received the 1989 Ivor Novello Award for Best Contemporary Song.

== Background and release ==
Initially, it received poor sales and airplay, reaching number 67 in the UK and number 30 in the Netherlands. After the success of the hip-hop version of "Rise to the Occasion", the song was re-released with a slight remix by Bob Clearmountain on 29 February 1988 and reached number two in the UK.

"Love Changes (Everything)" also reached number two in South Africa, number three in Israel, number seven in West Germany, number eight in Switzerland, number 15 in Austria, number 23 in Australia, number 23 in the US Hot 100 and number 16 on the US Billboard Dance Club Play chart, and number 12 on the Billboard Adult Contemporary chart. AllMusic journalist Michael Sutton described Climie Fisher's version of the song as having "a chorus that adheres to the brain like glue. In limited doses it's as tasty as a chocolate sundae."

== Track listings ==
7-inch EMI / EM 15 (UK, 1987)

1. "Love Changes (Everything)"
2. "Never Close the Show"

12-inch EMI / 12 EM 15 (UK, 1987)

1. "Love Changes (Everything)" (Love Mix) – 7:42
2. "Love Changes (Everything)" (7-inch Version) – 4:35
3. "Never Close the Show" – 4:03

7-inch Capitol Records / B-44137 (US & Canada, 1987)

1. "Love Changes (Everything)" – 3:54
2. "Never Close the Show" – 4:04

CD EMI / CD EM 15 (UK, 1987)

1. "Love Changes (Everything) – 4:36
2. "This Is Me" – 3:49
3. "Rise to the Occasion" – 4:46
4. "Never Let a Chance Go By" – 4:32

7-inch EMI / EM 47 (UK, 1988)

1. "Love Changes (Everything)"
2. "Never Close the Show"

12-inch EMI / 12 EM 47 (UK, 1988)

1. "Love Changes (Everything)" (Extended Mix) – 7:45
2. "Love Changes (Everything)" (House Mix) – 7:47
3. "Never Close the Show" – 4:04

12-inch Capitol Records / V-15373 (US & Canada, 1988)

1. "Love Changes (Everything)" (House Mix) – 7:47
2. "Love Changes (Everything)" (Single Mix) – 4:28
3. "Love Changes (Everything)" (Dance Mix) – 7:45
4. "Love Changes (Everything)" (Pop Mix) – 6:14

CD EMI / CD EM 47 (UK, 1988)

1. "Love Changes (Everything)" – 4:30
2. "Rise to the Occasion" (Hip Hop Remix) – 5:39
3. "Never Close the Show" – 4:02
4. "Love Changes (Everything)" (Extended Mix) – 5:44

== Charts ==
=== Weekly charts ===
Chart (1987)	Peak position
Belgium (Ultratop 50 Flanders)	29
Italy Airplay (Music & Media)	15
Netherlands (Dutch Top 40)	20
Netherlands (Single Top 100)	30
UK Singles (Official Charts)	67

Chart (1988)	Peak position
Australia (ARIA)	23
Austria (Ö3 Austria Top 40)	15
Canada Top Singles (RPM)	16
Europe (Eurochart Hot 100)	4
Finland (Suomen virallinen lista)	15
Iceland (Íslenski listinn Topp 10)	10
Ireland (IRMA)	4
New Zealand (Recorded Music NZ)	12
Portugal (AFP)	1
South Africa (Springbok Radio)	2
Switzerland (Schweizer Hitparade)	8
UK Singles (Official Charts)	2
US Billboard Hot 100	23
US Adult Contemporary (Billboard)	12
US Dance Club Play (Billboard)	16
US Cash Box Top 100	27
US CHR/Pop Airplay (Radio & Records)	23
West Germany (GfK)	7

=== Year-end charts ===
Chart (1988)	Position
Europe (Eurochart Hot 100)	72
South Africa (Springbok Radio)	8
UK Singles (OCC)	48
West Germany (Media Control)	57

== Certifications ==
Region	Certification	Certified units/sales
New Zealand (RMNZ)	Gold	15,000^{‡}
United Kingdom (BPI)	Silver	200,000^{‡}
^{‡} Sales+streaming figures based on certification alone.

== Release history ==
Region	Version	Date	Format(s)	Label(s)	Ref.
United Kingdom	Original	3 August 1987	7-inch vinyl; 12-inch vinyl; CD	EMI	
United Kingdom	Remix	29 February 1988	7-inch vinyl; 12-inch vinyl; CD; cassette	EMI	

== Musikk version ==
"Love Changes (Everything)"

Single by Musikk featuring John Rock
- Released: 2004
- Length: 3:50
- Label: Disco:Wax
- Songwriters: Simon Climie; Rob Fisher; Dennis Morgan
- Producers: Jesper Green; Mikkel Torsting

Musikk singles chronology
"Summer Lovin'" (2004)	"Love Changes (Everything)" (2004)	"Would I Lie to You" (2005)

John Rock singles chronology
"Summer Lovin'" (2004)	"Love Changes (Everything)" (2004)	"Popstar" (2005)

Musikk released a cover in 2004 and as a digital download on 24 May 2005. The song peaked at No. 2 on the Danish Singles Chart. It features vocals from Danish singer Jon Nørgaard under the name John Rock.

=== Track listing ===
Digital download

1. "Love Changes (Everything)" (Original Radio Edit) – 3:50
2. "Love Changes (Everything)" (Original Club Mix) – 5:37
3. "Love Changes (Everything)" (Monday Morning Remix Edit) – 4:37
4. "Love Changes (Everything)" (U-Facilities Remix Edit) – 3:38
5. "Love Changes (Everything)" (Monday Morning Remix) – 8:07
6. "Love Changes (Everything)" (U-Facilities Club Mix) – 7:48
7. "Love Changes (Everything)" (Instrumental) – 3:50
8. "Love Changes (Everything)" (Acapella) – 3:49

=== Charts ===
Chart (2004–2005)	Peak position
Denmark (Tracklisten)	2
Finland (Suomen virallinen lista)	13

=== Release history ===
Region	Date	Format
Denmark	2004	CD
Denmark	24 May 2005	Digital download
United Kingdom	24 May 2005	Digital download
