= Naked Eyes =

English new wave duo

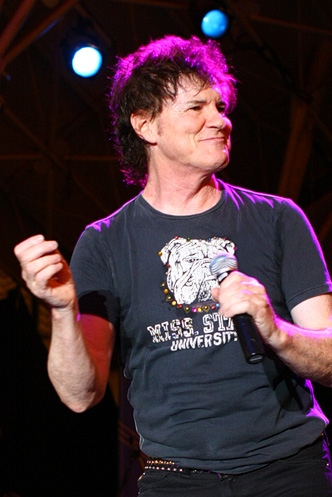
- Lead singer Pete Byrne performing in Las Vegas, 23 July 2011.

Background information
- Origin: Bath, Somerset, England
- Genres: New wave; synth-pop; pop rock
- Years active: 1982–1984; 2006–2026
- Labels: EMI; Parlophone; Oglio; Chrysalis
- Past members: Pete Byrne; Rob Fisher
- Website: nakedeyesmusic.com

Naked Eyes were an English new wave and synth-pop band. Formed in 1982 by vocalist Pete Byrne and keyboardist Rob Fisher, the band had four US top 40 singles in the 1980s. Naked Eyes are best known for their cover version of "Always Something There to Remind Me" (1982) & their hit songs "Promises, Promises" and "When The Lights Go Out."

== History ==
Naked Eyes was formed by Pete Byrne (vocals) and Rob Fisher (keyboards), two college friends from Bath, England. They had both been members of Neon, a new wave band that also included future Tears for Fears members Roland Orzabal and Curt Smith.

Naked Eyes' first hit, "Always Something There to Remind Me", is a synth-pop cover of the Burt Bacharach standard. The band had three subsequent top 40 hits: "Promises, Promises", "When the Lights Go Out" and "(What) In the Name of Love".

Naked Eyes disbanded following the release of their second album, Fuel for the Fire (1984). Despite their commercial success, Naked Eyes never toured during their initial run due to the technical difficulties of recreating their studio sound in concert.

Rob Fisher died on 25 August 1999, aged 42, following cancer surgery.

=== Reformation ===
In 2005, Byrne revived Naked Eyes as a live act.

On 31 July 2007, Naked Eyes released Fumbling with the Covers, an independent album of covers and Naked Eyes hits.

In 2008, Naked Eyes completed a US tour known as the Regeneration Tour along with Belinda Carlisle, ABC and The Human League.

On 8 June 2021, Naked Eyes released an independent album, Disguise the Limit.

Naked Eyes sued Reservoir Media for copyright infringement in 2022.

In 2024, Naked Eyes announced that it would take part in the Abducted by the 80's tour across the US and Canada with fellow 80's acts Wang Chung, Men Without Hats and The Motels.

Pete Byrne died in Los Angeles on 14 September 2026, aged 74, after a brief illness, effectively bringing Naked Eyes to an end.

== Discography ==
=== Studio albums ===
- Burning Bridges (1983) US #32, AUS #88 (self-titled in the US & Canada, with modified track listing and different cover artwork)
- Fuel for the Fire (1984) US #83

Rob Fisher and Pete Byrne, 1983

=== Independent albums ===
- Fumbling with the Covers (2007)
- Disguise the Limit (2021)

=== Compilation albums ===
- The Best of Naked Eyes (1991)
- Promises, Promises (The Very Best of Naked Eyes) (1994)
- Naked Eyes / Spandau Ballet – Back 2 Back Hits (1998)
- Everything and More (2002)

=== Singles ===
List of singles, with selected chart positions
Title	Year	Peak chart positions							Album
Title	Year	UK	AUS	CAN	NZ	US	US AC	US Dance	Album
"Always Something There to Remind Me"	1983	59	7	9	2	8	31	37	Burning Bridges/Naked Eyes
"Voices in My Head"	1983	—	—	—	—	—	—	—	Burning Bridges/Naked Eyes
"Promises, Promises"	1983	95	—	13	15	11	19	32	Burning Bridges/Naked Eyes
"When the Lights Go Out"	1983	—	—	—	—	37	—	—	Burning Bridges/Naked Eyes
"(What) In the Name of Love"	1984	—	—	77	—	39	—	35	Fuel for the Fire
"—" denotes a recording that did not chart or was not released in that territory.

=== Music videos ===
- "Always Something There to Remind Me" (1982)
- "Promises, Promises" (1983)
- "Voices in My Head" (1983)
- "When the Lights Go Out" (1983)
- "(What) In the Name of Love" (1984)
- "Cry Baby Cry" (2007)
