= Rise to the Occasion (Climie Fisher song) =

1987 single by Climie Fisher

Single by Climie Fisher

from the album Everything
- B-side: "Mental Block"
- Released: 9 November 1987
- Genre: House; hip hop
- Length: 4:47
- Label: EMI
- Songwriters: Simon Climie; Rob Fisher; Dennis Morgan
- Producers: Climie Fisher; Stephen Hague

Climie Fisher singles chronology
"Love Changes (Everything)" (1987)	"Rise to the Occasion" (1987)	"Love Changes (Everything)" (1988)

"Rise to the Occasion" is a song by English pop duo Climie Fisher from their debut album, Everything (1988). Released as the album's fourth single in November 1987, it was a top-20 hit in nine countries, including the Netherlands and South Africa, where it reached No. 1.

A popular remix by PWL's Phil Harding and Jamie Bromfield called the "Hip Hop mix" was released as the A-side on 7-inch and 12-inch formats. It was after the success of this mix that "Love Changes (Everything)" was re-issued in 1988 and became a much bigger hit than its initial release. The song's music video was directed by Dieter Trattmann.

== Charts ==
=== Weekly charts ===
Chart (1988)	Peak position
Austria (Ö3 Austria Top 40)	19
Belgium (Ultratop 50 Flanders)	6
Europe (European Hot 100 Singles)	27
Finland (Suomen virallinen lista)	6
Ireland (IRMA)	9
Italy Airplay (Music & Media)	7
Netherlands (Dutch Top 40)	4
Netherlands (Single Top 100)	1
South Africa (Springbok Radio)	1
Sweden (Sverigetopplistan)	17
UK Singles (OCC)	10
West Germany (GfK)	14

=== Year-end charts ===
Chart (1988)	Position
Belgium (Ultratop 50 Flanders)	48
Netherlands (Dutch Top 40)	30
Netherlands (Single Top 100)	24
South Africa (Springbok Radio)	13

== Release history ==
Region	Date	Format(s)	Label(s)	Ref.
United Kingdom	9 November 1987	7-inch vinyl; 12-inch vinyl; CD	EMI	
United Kingdom	16 November 1987	12-inch remix vinyl	EMI	
