= Simon Climie =

British singer-songwriter and producer (born 1957)

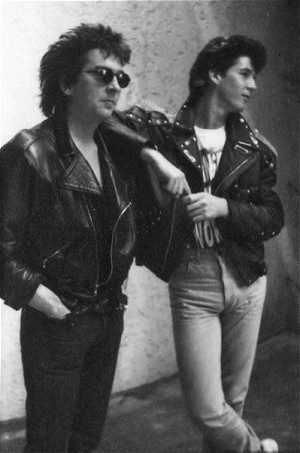
- Climie (right) with Rob Fisher at the Montreux Pop Festival in Switzerland 1988

Background information
- Born: Simon Crispin Climie; 7 April 1957 (age 69); Fulham, London, England
- Occupations: Songwriter; musician; record producer
- Instruments: Vocals; guitar; keyboards
- Years active: 1987–present
- Labels: EMI; Columbia
- Website: Simon Climie Songs

Simon Climie (born 7 April 1957) is an English songwriter, musician and record producer. He is best known as the former lead singer of the UK duo Climie Fisher.

== Biography ==
Climie was born in London. Beginning his career primarily as a songwriter/session musician, Climie found himself scoring early hits by the mid-1980s with compositions recorded by George Michael and Aretha Franklin ("I Knew You Were Waiting (For Me)") and Pat Benatar ("Invincible"). He also wrote songs appearing on albums by such artists as Frida, Smokey Robinson, and Jeff Beck during this time. Then, on the fringes of session work, he did the Fairlight CMI programming for Scritti Politti's song "Small Talk" from their second studio album Cupid & Psyche 85.

Later in the 1980s, he formed Climie Fisher together with Rob Fisher, whom he had met when they were both session musicians at Abbey Road Studios. With Climie fronting the group, Climie Fisher had hits in many territories, with the singles "Love Changes (Everything)", which won an Ivor Novello Award, "Rise to the Occasion", "This Is Me" and more. Concurrent with his time in Climie Fisher, Climie continued with songwriting, landing another big hit in 1988 with Rod Stewart's recording of "My Heart Can't Tell You No".

After leaving EMI and the final Climie Fisher album Coming in for the Kill, Climie signed to Sony's Columbia label as a solo artist, releasing an album called Soul Inspiration in 1992.

In the mid-1990s Climie expanded to production, while continuing his songwriting career, producing and writing songs for a number of artists, including MN8, Eternal, Louise Redknapp, B. B. King, and Zucchero Fornaciari.

As the 90s progressed, Climie began a long-time collaboration with Eric Clapton beginning with his albums Pilgrim (1998), Reptile (2001), Riding with the King (2000), Me And Mr. Johnson, Back Home and The Road to Escondido (2006). In addition, he embarked on a similar musical partnership with Michael McDonald, producing McDonald's Motown (2003), Motown II (2004) and Soul Speak (2008) albums. The third of these featured collaborations with Stevie Wonder and Toni Braxton, while the Grammy-nominated Motown spawned the US hit cover of "Ain't No Mountain High Enough".

Climie's songwriting success continued into the 2010s, with Sara Evans cracking the American country music charts for more than six months with her cover of "My Heart Can't Tell You No", while Chris Medina – who had already reached number one in a number of territories around the world with his first single – collaborated with Climie on his second single, "One More Time", and several songs on the album What Are Words.

Together with U2 drummer Larry Mullen, Jr., Climie co-wrote the film score and theme for Man on the Train (2011 TriBeCa Productions film) in which Mullen stars with Donald Sutherland.

In 2013, he worked on production and mixing of Eric Clapton's album Old Sock, which reached number one in the American Billboard Independent Chart in March 2013 and number seven in the Billboard 200. In 2014, Climie was co-producer again with Eric Clapton of the album The Breeze: An Appreciation of JJ Cale, a tribute to Clapton's long time friend, the late singer/songwriter JJ Cale.

In 2016, Climie was the co-producer with Clapton on the album Live in San Diego which was recorded during the "Doyle & Derek World Tour" in 2007.

As a producer, Climie has won two Grammys for the albums Riding with the King in 2000 and The Road to Escondido in 2007. He received another Grammy nomination for Pilgrim in 1998.

== Personal life ==
Climie is the son of David Climie, co-writer of the 1960s and 1970s television comedy series, Oh, Brother!, which starred Derek Nimmo, as well as Lulu's Back in Town, the comedy series Bootsie and Snudge, Backs to the Land, Wodehouse Playhouse, That Was The Week That Was, The Army Game, the sci-fi series Out of the Unknown and the comedy film Desert Mice.

== Discography ==
Includes songs and albums Climie has written, performed and/or produced.

=== Albums ===
- Everything (as part of Climie Fisher, 1987)
- Coming In for the Kill (as part of Climie Fisher, 1989)
- Soul Inspiration (solo, 1992)
- Retail Therapy – T.D.F. (production and writing)
- Pilgrim – Eric Clapton (1998, production and writing)
- Riding with the King – B. B. King and Eric Clapton (2000, production)
- Motown I – Michael McDonald (production)
- Reptile – Eric Clapton (2001, production and writing)
- One More Car, One More Rider – Eric Clapton (2002, production and writing)
- Motown II – Michael McDonald (production)
- Me and Mr. Johnson – Eric Clapton (2004, production)
- Back Home – Eric Clapton (2005, production and writing)
- Soul Speak – Michael McDonald (production and writing)
- TLFM – Lara Fabian
- What Are Words – Chris Medina
- Live in San Diego – Eric Clapton (2016, production)

=== Singles ===
- Pat Benatar – "Invincible" (US Top Ten)
- Maxine – 1984
- Westlife – "World of Our Own"
- Climie Fisher – "Love Changes (Everything)"
- Climie Fisher – "Rise to the Occasion"
- Climie Fisher – "This Is Me"
- Eric Clapton – "My Father's Eyes" (won Grammy Award for Best Male Pop Vocal Performance in 1999)
- Eric Clapton – "(I) Get Lost"
- George Michael and Aretha Franklin – "I Knew You Were Waiting (For Me)" (co-writer)
- Michael McDonald – "Ain't No Mountain High Enough"
- Eternal – "Someday"
- Zucchero Fornaciari – "Everybody's Got to Learn Sometime"
- "Soul Inspiration" (UK No. 60)
- "Does Your Heart Still Break"
- "Oh How the Years Go By"
- Rod Stewart, Sara Evans – "My Heart Can't Tell You No"
- Chris Medina – "One More Time"

== T.D.F. ==
T.D.F. was a dance act project featuring Climie and Eric Clapton, with Clapton working under the name of x-sample. "TDF" is an acronym for Totally Dysfunctional Family. The project released one album called Retail Therapy on the Reprise record label. The title supposedly alludes to Clapton's "addiction" to buying clothes. Eric Clapton states in his autobiography that he persuaded Giorgio Armani, a friend of Clapton's, to let them do the music for one of his fashion shows. The track "Seven" from the album contains a sample of B. B. King's "How Blue Can You Get".

=== Discography ===
==== Albums ====
Title and details
Retail Therapy
- Type: Album
- Record label: Reprise
- Released: 11 March 1997
Notes

No.	Title	Length
1.	"Blue Rock"
2.	"Angelica"
3.	"Pnom-Sen"
4.	"Sno God"
5.	"Sienna"
6.	"Seven"
7.	"Angelica’s Dream"
8.	"What She Wants"
9.	"Donna"
10.	"Rip Stop"
11.	"What Else"
