= (There's) Always Something There to Remind Me =

1964 single by Lou Johnson

- Swedish release picture sleeve

Single by Lou Johnson

from the album The Magic Potion Of...
- B-side: "Wouldn't That Be Something"
- Released: 1964
- Genre: Pop; soul
- Length: 2:58
- Label: Big Hill
- Songwriters: Burt Bacharach; Hal David
- Producer: Burt Bacharach

Lou Johnson singles chronology
"Reach Out for Me" (1963)	"(There's) Always Something There to Remind Me" (1964)	"Kentucky Bluebird (Message To Martha)" (1964)

"(There's) Always Something There to Remind Me" is a song written by American songwriting duo Burt Bacharach and Hal David. Originally recorded as a demonstration tape by Dionne Warwick in 1963, "(There's) Always Something There to Remind Me" first charted for Lou Johnson, whose version reached number 49 on the Billboard Hot 100 in mid-1964. Sandie Shaw took the song to number one in the UK that same year, while the duo Naked Eyes had a number-eight hit with the song in the US two decades later in 1983.

== Sandie Shaw version ==
"(There's) Always Something There to Remind Me"
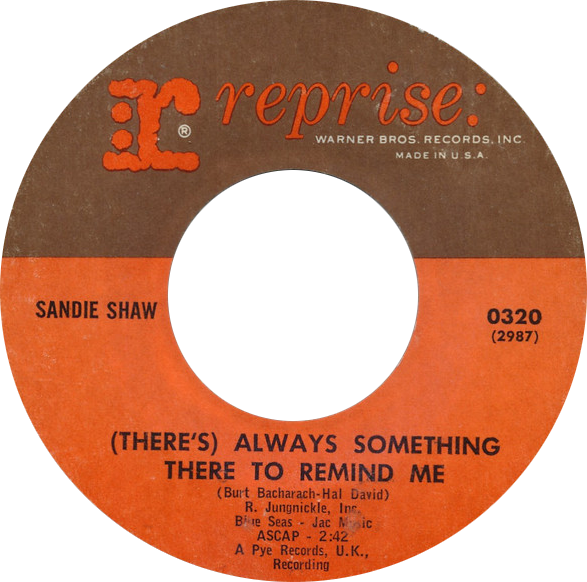
- Side A of a 1960s US re-pressing

Single by Sandie Shaw
- B-side: "Don't You Know"
- Released: September 1964
- Recorded: 1964
- Genre: Pop
- Length: 2:42
- Label: Pye; Reprise (US)
- Songwriters: Burt Bacharach; Hal David
- Producer: Tony Hatch

Sandie Shaw singles chronology
"As Long As You're Happy Baby" (1964)	"(There's) Always Something There to Remind Me" (1964)	"I'd Be Far Better Off Without You" (1964)

British impresario Eve Taylor heard Johnson's version while on a US visit scouting for material for her recent discovery, Sandie Shaw, who consequently covered the song for the UK market. Rush-released in September 1964, the song was premiered by Shaw with a performance on Ready Steady Go!, the pop music TV program. The first week after its release, the single sold 65,000 copies. Shaw's version reached number one on the UK Singles Chart, spending three weeks there in November 1964, and that same month, it debuted on the Billboard Hot 100. Despite reaching the top 10 in some markets, including Detroit and Miami, Shaw's version failed to best the US showing of the Lou Johnson original; the Hot 100 peak of Shaw's version was number 52.

A number-one hit in Canada and South Africa, Shaw's version of "...Always Something There to Remind Me" was also a hit in Australia (number 16), Ireland (number seven), and the Netherlands (number 10); the track's success in the last territory did not preclude hit status for the Dutch rendering by Edwin Rutten entitled "Ik moet altijd weer opnieuw aan je denken" (number 12). Shaw herself recorded "...Always Something There to Remind Me" in French, as "Toujours un coin qui me rappelle", with lyrics by Ralph Bernet, which reached number 19 in France, and in Italian, as "Il Mondo Nei Tuoi Occhi". A cover by Eddy Mitchell was more successful, reaching number two in France in April 1965 and also reaching number three on Belgium's French-language chart. Shaw made a bid for a German hit, as well, rendering "...Always Something There to Remind Me" as "Einmal glücklich sein wie die ander'n". It was not a success.

Film composer Steven Price did a cover for the 2021 film Last Night in Soho, subtitled (Soho Version), with the first half being the Sandie Shaw version and the second half of the track being the orchestra.

=== Charts ===
English version
Chart (1964–65)	Peak position
Australia	16
Canada	1
Ireland (Irish Singles Chart)	7
Netherlands (Single Top 100)	10
New Zealand (Lever)	6
South Africa	1
UK Singles (OCC)	1
US Billboard Hot 100	52
US Cash Box Top 100	49

French version
Chart (1965)	Peak position
Belgium	3
France	2

== The Carpenters version ==
The Carpenters included the song on the 1971 album Carpenters. It was included in a medley of other Bacharach and Hal David songs, including "I'll Never Fall in Love Again", "Walk on By", and "Do You Know the Way to San Jose". The song did not chart, but the album reached number two.

== R. B. Greaves version ==
"Always Something There to Remind Me"

Single by R. B. Greaves

from the album R.B. Greaves
- B-side: "Oh When I Was a Boy"
- Released: 1969
- Recorded: 1969
- Genre: Pop
- Length: 3:09
- Label: Atco
- Songwriters: Burt Bacharach; Hal David
- Producers: Ahmet Ertegun; Jackson Howe

R. B. Greaves singles chronology
"Take a Letter Maria" (1969)	"Always Something There to Remind Me" (1969)	"Fire & Rain" (1970)

"(There's) Always Something There to Remind Me" – as "Always Something There to Remind Me" – entered the US top 40 for the first time via a version by R. B. Greaves which reached No. 27 in February 1970. Recorded at Muscle Shoals Sound Studio in 1969, with production by Ahmet Ertegun and Jackson Howe, Greaves' version was also a No. 3 Easy Listening hit. This version peaked at number 48 in Australia. In Canada, it reached number 12.

== Naked Eyes version ==
"Always Something There to Remind Me"

Single by Naked Eyes

from the album Burning Bridges
- B-side: "The Time Is Now"
- Released: October 10, 1982
- Recorded: 1982
- Studio: Abbey Road (London, England)
- Genre: Synth-pop; new wave
- Length: 3:40
- Label: EMI
- Songwriters: Burt Bacharach; Hal David
- Producer: Tony Mansfield

Naked Eyes singles chronology
"Always Something There to Remind Me" (1982)	"Voices in My Head" (1983)

Nearly 20 years after its composition, the song became a major hit in the United States for the first time via a synth-pop reinvention by Naked Eyes titled "Always Something There to Remind Me", which peaked inside the top 10 of the Billboard Hot 100 in the summer of 1983.

Vocalist Pete Byrne and keyboardist Rob Fisher first cut "Always Something There to Remind Me" as one of a number of demos recorded in Bristol upon forming the duo later known as Naked Eyes in early 1982. Byrne would recall: "I had always loved the song 'Always Something There to Remind Me' so we called a friend who had the record, he read the lyric over the phone and we put it together from memory."

On the strength of the demos cut in Bristol, Byrne and Fisher were signed to EMI Records in May 1982 and the track "Always Something There to Remind Me" was cut on September 1, 1982, in a session at Abbey Road Studios produced by Tony Mansfield. Byrne would recall: "The record was recorded at Abbey Road, and we were invited to a party downstairs, with Paul McCartney and many other stars...When we returned upstairs to the studio around 1 a.m., I decided to have a go at the vocal, it was the first time I have ever recorded a vocal in one take".

Originally released in the UK in 1982, Naked Eyes' "Always Something There to Remind Me" gradually gained attention, entering the Billboard Hot 100 in March 1983 to peak at No. 8 that June, becoming the duo's only top 10 American hit. The cachet of entering the US top 10 allowed the single, previously overlooked in its performers' United Kingdom homeland, to make a July 1983 UK chart debut, although it only rose to No. 59. "Always Something There to Remind Me" did afford Naked Eyes top 10 success in other countries besides the United States: Australia (No. 7), Canada (No. 9) and New Zealand (No. 2).

=== Charts ===
Weekly charts
Chart (1983)	Peak position
Australia (Kent Music Report)	7
Canada Top Singles (RPM)	9
New Zealand (RIANZ)	2
UK Singles (OCC)	59
US Billboard Hot 100	8
US Adult Contemporary (Billboard)	31
US Dance/Disco (Billboard)	37
US Cash Box Top 100	7

Year-end charts
Chart (1983)	Rank
Australia (Kent Music Report)	42
Canada Top Singles (RPM)	60
New Zealand (RIANZ)	21
US Billboard Hot 100	46
US Cash Box Top 100	50

== Tin Tin Out featuring Espiritu version ==
"Always (Something There to Remind Me)"

Single by Tin Tin Out featuring Espiritu

from the album Always
- Released: March 13, 1995
- Genre: House
- Length: 3:29 (original edit); 7:02 (original mix)
- Label: WEA
- Songwriters: Burt Bacharach; Hal David
- Producers: Darren Stokes; Lindsay Edwards

Tin Tin Out singles chronology
"The Feeling" (1994)	"Always (Something There to Remind Me)" (1995)	"All I Wanna Do" (1997)

Music video
- "Always (Something There to Remind Me)" on YouTube

English electronic music duo Tin Tin Out recorded a house cover of the song titled "Always (Something There to Remind Me)" in 1995. The song features vocals by French singer Espiritu (aka Vanessa Quinones). This version, released by WEA on March 13, reached No. 14 on the UK Singles Chart and No. 1 on the UK Dance Singles Chart. The accompanying music video was filmed in the Café de Paris in London.

=== Critical reception ===
A reviewer from pan-European magazine Music & Media wrote, "The first thing she [Espiritu] reminds you of is all the previous versions of this Burt Bacharach & Hal David song. Spirited and dancey as it is, it doesn't make a poor figure at all." Brad Beatnik from Music Week's RM Dance Update commented, "This unabashed house cover of Dusty Springfield's 'Always Something There to Remind Me' is already on its way into the dancefloor history books thanks to its initial Hooj Choons release and its ability to whip a club into a total frenzy. Simple in its piano house format and chugging Euro rhythm, this is hardbag house at its purest and most joyful." Another editor, James Hamilton, noted, "Vannessa calmly croons the title over piping wheezy organ and plonking piano in [a] naggingly effective simple jiggly chugging 0-129.7bpm [track]".

=== Track listings ===
12-inch single, UK (1994)
No.	Title	Length
1.	"Always..." (original mix)	6:59
2.	"Always..." (Tooley St mix)	8:04

7-inch single, UK (1995)
No.	Title	Length
1.	"Always (Something There to Remind Me)" (original edit)	3:29
2.	"Always (Something There to Remind Me)" (Tooley St. edit)	3:40

CD single, Europe (1995)
No.	Title	Length
1.	"Always (Something There to Remind Me)" (original edit)	3:29
2.	"Always (Something There to Remind Me)" (Tooley St. edit)	3:40
3.	"Always (Something There to Remind Me)" (original mix)	6:58
4.	"Always (Something There to Remind Me)" (Tooley St. mix)	8:02
5.	"Always (Something There to Remind Me)" (original instrumental)	6:57
6.	"Always (Something There to Remind Me)" (Tooley St. instrumental)	8:02

=== Charts ===
==== Weekly charts ====
Chart (1994)	Peak position
UK Club Chart (Music Week)	49

Chart (1995)	Peak position
Australia (ARIA)	121
Europe (Eurochart Hot 100)	42
Ireland (IRMA)	28
Israel (Israeli Singles Chart)	21
Scottish Singles Sales (Official Charts)	16
UK Singles (Official Charts)	14
UK Dance (Official Charts)	1
UK Airplay (Music Week)	37
UK Club Chart (Music Week)	4
UK Pop Tip Club Chart (Music Week)	3

==== Year-end charts ====
Chart (1995)	Position
UK Pop Tip Club Chart (Music Week)	15
