= Rob Fisher (British musician) =

British keyboardist and songwriter (1956–1999)

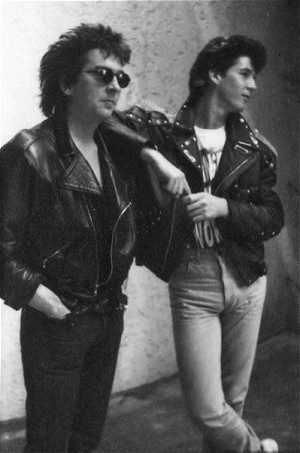
- Fisher (left) and Simon Climie at the Montreux Pop Festival in Switzerland, 1988

Background information
- Born: 5 November 1956
- Origin: Cheltenham, England
- Died: 25 August 1999 (aged 42)
- Genres: New wave; synth-pop
- Occupations: Musician; songwriter
- Instrument: Keyboards
- Years active: 1976–1999
- Label: 3D Music
- Formerly of: Neon; Naked Eyes; Climie Fisher

Rob Fisher (5 November 1956 – 25 August 1999) was an English keyboardist and songwriter from Cheltenham, England, who achieved chart success as a member of the new wave band Naked Eyes and, later, Climie Fisher. He attended Lord Wandsworth College in Hampshire, where he was a member of a band called Cirrus with Nick Ryall (guitar and flute) and Ray Coop (bass).

== Career ==
Fisher's early bands were Whitewing (1975–1978) and the Xtians (1978), both during his time at the University of Bath. In 1979, he joined up with Pete Byrne to form Neon, whose first single "Making Waves/Me I See in You" was released on their own 3D Music label. The band later went on to recruit Neil Taylor, Manny Elias, Curt Smith and Roland Orzabal before they finally broke up in December 1981. In 1982, Fisher and Pete Byrne, who were key figures in the early days of synth-pop, formed the duo Naked Eyes, while in 1981 Smith and Orzabal formed Tears for Fears.

Naked Eyes' two biggest hits were their rendition of the Burt Bacharach song "Always Something There to Remind Me", and the self-penned "Promises, Promises". They had two more US top 40 hits, "When the Lights Go Out" and "(What) In the Name of Love", before going their separate ways. They resumed their writing partnership after a five-year break, and some of the songs written during this period appeared on the 2001 Pete Byrne album, The Real Illusion.

In 1987, Fisher re-emerged as one half of the pop duo Climie Fisher with singer-songwriter Simon Climie. Together they took "Love Changes (Everything)" to the UK No. 2 spot, while the hip hop-inspired "Rise to the Occasion" also cracked the top 10 in the United Kingdom.

After the break-up of Climie Fisher, Fisher collaborated on several songs with Rick Astley and Jules Shear. For some years, Fisher owned his own studio, The StoneRoom, in Shepherd's Bush, where, until shortly before his death, he had been working with Pete Byrne on a new Naked Eyes studio album.

== Death ==
Fisher died on 25 August 1999, aged 42, following surgery for bowel cancer.

== Discography ==
=== With Neon ===
- "Making Waves" / "Me I See in You" (1980)
- "Communication Without Sound" (1981)

=== With Naked Eyes ===
- Burning Bridges (1983)
- Fuel for the Fire (1984)

=== With Climie Fisher ===
- Everything (1987)
- Coming In for the Kill (1989)

== See also ==
- Pete Byrne
- Naked Eyes
- Climie Fisher
