= On Every Street Tour =

1991–92 concert tour by Dire Straits

- World tour by Dire Straits
- Location: Europe; Oceania; North America
- Associated album: On Every Street
- Start date: 23 August 1991
- End date: 9 October 1992
- Legs: 4
- No. of shows: 229
- Attendance: 7.1 million

Dire Straits concert chronology
- Brothers in Arms Tour (1985–86); On Every Street Tour (1991–92)

The On Every Street Tour was the final concert tour by British rock band Dire Straits, supporting their sixth and final album, On Every Street. It lasted from 23 August 1991 to 9 October 1992, and included 229 shows in 19 countries throughout Europe, North America, Australia and New Zealand. The world tour sold 7.1 million tickets.

The tour lineup included Mark Knopfler (guitar, vocals), John Illsley (bass, backing vocals), Guy Fletcher (keyboards, backing vocals), Alan Clark (keyboards), Chris White (saxophone, flute, backing vocals), Paul Franklin (pedal steel guitar), Danny Cummings (percussion), Phil Palmer (guitar, backing vocals), and Chris Whitten (drums).

"The last tour was utter misery," said manager Ed Bicknell. "Whatever the zeitgeist was that we had been part of, it had passed." "Personal relationships were in trouble and it put a terrible strain on everybody, emotionally and physically," agreed Illsley. "We were changed by it."

Concerts in Nîmes, France and Rotterdam, The Netherlands were recorded in May 1992 and released in 1993 on the live album On The Night.

== Tour dates ==
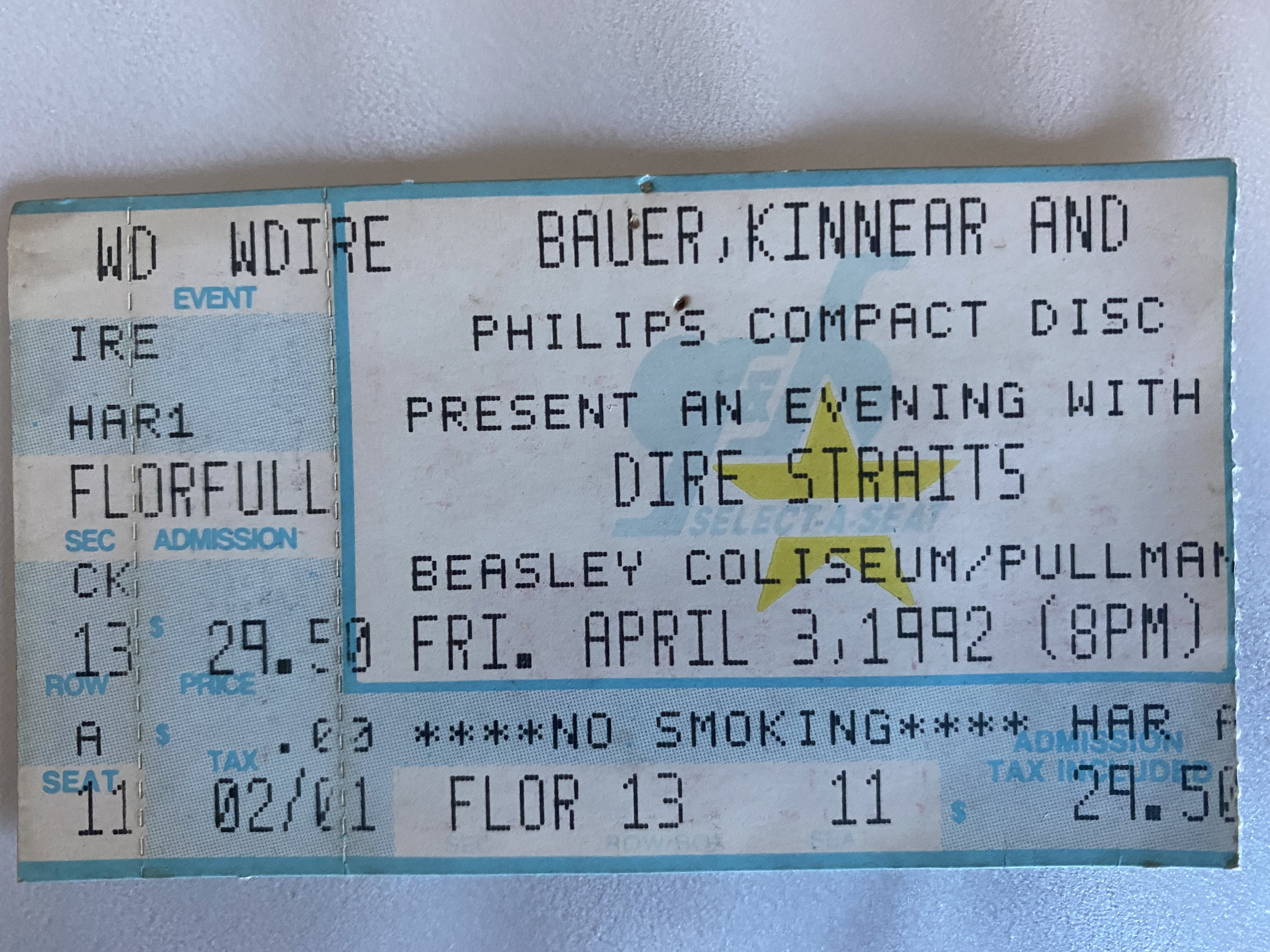

Date	City	Country	Venue
Europe
23 August 1991	Dublin	Ireland	Point Depot
24 August 1991	Dublin	Ireland	Point Depot
25 August 1991	Dublin	Ireland	Point Depot
26 August 1991	Dublin	Ireland	Point Depot
27 August 1991	Dublin	Ireland	Point Depot
30 August 1991	Sheffield	England	Sheffield Arena
31 August 1991	Sheffield	England	Sheffield Arena
1 September 1991	Sheffield	England	Sheffield Arena
2 September 1991	Sheffield	England	Sheffield Arena
3 September 1991	Sheffield	England	Sheffield Arena
5 September 1991	Birmingham	England	National Exhibition Centre
6 September 1991	Birmingham	England	National Exhibition Centre
7 September 1991	Birmingham	England	National Exhibition Centre
8 September 1991	Birmingham	England	National Exhibition Centre
9 September 1991	Birmingham	England	National Exhibition Centre
11 September 1991	Glasgow	Scotland	Scottish Exhibition and Conference Centre
12 September 1991	Glasgow	Scotland	Scottish Exhibition and Conference Centre
13 September 1991	Glasgow	Scotland	Scottish Exhibition and Conference Centre
14 September 1991	Glasgow	Scotland	Scottish Exhibition and Conference Centre
16 September 1991	London	England	Wembley Arena
17 September 1991	London	England	Wembley Arena
18 September 1991	London	England	Wembley Arena
19 September 1991	London	England	Wembley Arena
20 September 1991	London	England	Wembley Arena
23 September 1991	Dortmund	Germany	Westfalenhallen
24 September 1991	Dortmund	Germany	Westfalenhallen
25 September 1991	Dortmund	Germany	Westfalenhallen
26 September 1991	Bremen	Germany	Stadthalle Bremen
27 September 1991	Bremen	Germany	Stadthalle Bremen
28 September 1991	Rotterdam	Netherlands	Rotterdam Ahoy
29 September 1991	Rotterdam	Netherlands	Rotterdam Ahoy
30 September 1991	Rotterdam	Netherlands	Rotterdam Ahoy
1 October 1991	Brussels	Belgium	Forest National
2 October 1991	Brussels	Belgium	Forest National
3 October 1991	Paris	France	Palais Omnisports de Paris-Bercy
4 October 1991	Paris	France	Palais Omnisports de Paris-Bercy
5 October 1991	Paris	France	Palais Omnisports de Paris-Bercy
7 October 1991	Frankfurt	Germany	Festhalle Frankfurt
8 October 1991	Frankfurt	Germany	Festhalle Frankfurt
9 October 1991	Frankfurt	Germany	Festhalle Frankfurt
11 October 1991	Munich	Germany	Olympiahalle
12 October 1991	Munich	Germany	Olympiahalle
14 October 1991	Zürich	Switzerland	Hallenstadion
Oceania
29 October 1991	Sydney	Australia	Sydney Entertainment Centre
30 October 1991	Sydney	Australia	Sydney Entertainment Centre
31 October 1991	Sydney	Australia	Sydney Entertainment Centre
1 November 1991	Sydney	Australia	Sydney Entertainment Centre
2 November 1991	Sydney	Australia	Sydney Entertainment Centre
3 November 1991	Sydney	Australia	Sydney Entertainment Centre
4 November 1991	Sydney	Australia	Sydney Entertainment Centre
5 November 1991	Sydney	Australia	Sydney Entertainment Centre
7 November 1991	Boondall	Australia	Brisbane Entertainment Centre
8 November 1991	Boondall	Australia	Brisbane Entertainment Centre
9 November 1991	Boondall	Australia	Brisbane Entertainment Centre
10 November 1991	Boondall	Australia	Brisbane Entertainment Centre
11 November 1991	Boondall	Australia	Brisbane Entertainment Centre
13 November 1991	Melbourne	Australia	National Tennis Centre at Flinders Park
14 November 1991	Melbourne	Australia	National Tennis Centre at Flinders Park
15 November 1991	Melbourne	Australia	National Tennis Centre at Flinders Park
16 November 1991	Melbourne	Australia	National Tennis Centre at Flinders Park
17 November 1991	Melbourne	Australia	National Tennis Centre at Flinders Park
18 November 1991	Melbourne	Australia	National Tennis Centre at Flinders Park
23 November 1991	Perth	Australia	Subiaco Oval
26 November 1991	Adelaide	Australia	Adelaide Entertainment Centre
5 December 1991	Sydney	Australia	Sydney Entertainment Centre
10 December 1991	Canberra	Australia	Bruce Stadium
14 December 1991	Christchurch	New Zealand	Lancaster Park
17 December 1991	Wellington	New Zealand	Athletic Park
20 December 1991	Auckland	New Zealand	Mount Smart Stadium
21 December 1991	Auckland	New Zealand	Mount Smart Stadium
North America
30 January 1992	Sacramento	United States	ARCO Arena
31 January 1992	Reno	United States	Lawlor Events Center
1 February 1992	Oakland	United States	Oakland-Alameda County Coliseum Arena
2 February 1992	Oakland	United States	Oakland-Alameda County Coliseum Arena
4 February 1992	Fresno	United States	Selland Arena
5 February 1992	San Diego	United States	San Diego Sports Arena
6 February 1992	Las Vegas	United States	Bally's
7 February 1992	Inglewood	United States	Great Western Forum
8 February 1992	Inglewood	United States	Great Western Forum
10 February 1992	Phoenix	United States	Arizona Veterans Memorial Coliseum
13 February 1992	Houston	United States	The Summit
14 February 1992	Dallas	United States	Reunion Arena
16 February 1992	Kansas City	United States	Kemper Arena
17 February 1992	Champaign	United States	Assembly Hall
18 February 1992	Rosemont	United States	Rosemont Horizon
19 February 1992	Auburn Hills	United States	The Palace of Auburn Hills
20 February 1992	Richfield	United States	Richfield Coliseum
21 February 1992	Dayton	United States	Nutter Center
23 February 1992	East Rutherford	United States	Meadowlands Arena
24 February 1992	Landover	United States	Capital Centre
25 February 1992	Binghamton	United States	Broome County Veterans Memorial Arena
26 February 1992	New York City	United States	Madison Square Garden
28 February 1992	Uniondale	United States	Nassau Coliseum
29 February 1992	Albany	United States	Knickerbocker Arena
1 March 1992	Providence	United States	Providence Civic Center
2 March 1992	Philadelphia	United States	The Spectrum
3 March 1992	Philadelphia	United States	The Spectrum
4 March 1992	Syracuse	United States	Onondaga County War Memorial Arena
5 March 1992	Worcester	United States	Worcester Centrum
6 March 1992	Hartford	United States	Hartford Civic Center
9 March 1992	Halifax	Canada	Metro Centre
10 March 1992	Halifax	Canada	Metro Centre
11 March 1992	Moncton	Canada	Moncton Coliseum
12 March 1992	Quebec City	Canada	Colisée de Québec
13 March 1992	Montreal	Canada	Montreal Forum
14 March 1992	Ottawa	Canada	Ottawa Civic Centre
16 March 1992	Ottawa	Canada	Ottawa Civic Centre
17 March 1992	Hamilton	Canada	Copps Coliseum
19 March 1992	Toronto	Canada	Maple Leaf Gardens
20 March 1992	Toronto	Canada	Maple Leaf Gardens
21 March 1992	Sudbury	Canada	Sudbury Community Arena
24 March 1992	Winnipeg	Canada	Winnipeg Arena
26 March 1992	Regina	Canada	Regina Agridome
27 March 1992	Saskatoon	Canada	Saskatchewan Place
28 March 1992	Edmonton	Canada	Northlands Coliseum
29 March 1992	Calgary	Canada	Olympic Saddledome
30 March 1992	Calgary	Canada	Olympic Saddledome
31 March 1992	Vancouver	Canada	Pacific Coliseum
1 April 1992	Vancouver	Canada	Pacific Coliseum
3 April 1992	Pullman	United States	Beasley Coliseum
4 April 1992	Seattle	United States	Seattle Center Coliseum
6 April 1992	Portland	United States	Veterans Memorial Coliseum
Europe
18 April 1992	Metz	France	Galaxy
19 April 1992	Metz	France	Galaxy
20 April 1992	Lyon	France	Halle Tony Garnier
21 April 1992	Lyon	France	Halle Tony Garnier
22 April 1992	Grenoble	France	Palais des Sports
24 April 1992	Paris	France	Palais Omnisports de Bercy
25 April 1992	Paris	France	Palais Omnisports de Bercy
26 April 1992	Paris	France	Palais Omnisports de Bercy
27 April 1992	Paris	France	Palais Omnisports de Bercy
28 April 1992	Paris	France	Palais Omnisports de Bercy
29 April 1992	Paris	France	Palais Omnisports de Bercy
30 April 1992	Paris	France	Palais Omnisports de Bercy
2 May 1992	Brest	France	Parc de Penfeld
4 May 1992	Bordeaux	France	La Patinoire
5 May 1992	San Sebastián	Spain	Velódrome de Anoeta
6 May 1992	San Sebastián	Spain	Velódrome de Anoeta
8 May 1992	Barcelona	Spain	Plaza De Toros Monumental
9 May 1992	Barcelona	Spain	Plaza De Toros Monumental
10 May 1992	Barcelona	Spain	Plaza De Toros Monumental
13 May 1992	Madrid	Spain	Estadio Vicente Calderón
16 May 1992	Lisbon	Portugal	Estádio José Alvalade
19 May 1992	Nîmes	France	Arena of Nîmes
20 May 1992	Nîmes	France	Arena of Nîmes
21 May 1992	Nîmes	France	Arena of Nîmes
24 May 1992	Nantes	France	Stade de la Beaujoire
27 May 1992	Werchter	Belgium	Werchter festival ground
29 May 1992	Rotterdam	Netherlands	De Kuip
30 May 1992	Rotterdam	Netherlands	De Kuip
31 May 1992	Rotterdam	Netherlands	De Kuip
1 June 1992	Rotterdam	Netherlands	De Kuip
3 June 1992	London	England	Earls Court Exhibition Centre
4 June 1992	London	England	Earls Court Exhibition Centre
5 June 1992	London	England	Earls Court Exhibition Centre
6 June 1992	London	England	Earls Court Exhibition Centre
7 June 1992	London	England	Earls Court Exhibition Centre
8 June 1992	London	England	Earls Court Exhibition Centre
11 June 1992	Cardiff	Wales	Cardiff Arms Park
13 June 1992	Gateshead	England	Gateshead International Stadium
16 June 1992	Manchester	England	Maine Road
18 June 1992	Ipswich	England	Portman Road
20 June 1992	Bedfordshire	England	Woburn Abbey
25 June 1992	Lausanne	Switzerland	Stade Olympique de la Pontaise
27 June 1992	Basel	Switzerland	St. Jakob Stadium
28 June 1992	Basel	Switzerland	St. Jakob Stadium
30 June 1992	Stuttgart	Germany	Hanns-Martin-Schleyer-Halle
3 July 1992	Vienna	Austria	Praterstadion
5 July 1992	Linz	Austria	Linzer Stadion
7 July 1992	Frankfurt	Germany	Waldstadion
9 July 1992	Karlsruhe	Germany	Wildparkstadion
11 July 1992	Munich	Germany	Olympiastadion
13 July 1992	Nuremberg	Germany	Zeppelinfeld
15 July 1992	Hamburg	Germany	Alsterdorfer Sporthalle
16 July 1992	Hamburg	Germany	Alsterdorfer Sporthalle
17 July 1992	Cologne	Germany	Müngersdorfer Stadion
18 July 1992	Cologne	Germany	Müngersdorfer Stadion
20 July 1992	Berlin	Germany	Waldbühne
21 July 1992	Berlin	Germany	Waldbühne
22 July 1992	Berlin	Germany	Waldbühne
25 July 1992	Bremen	Germany	Weserstadion
27 July 1992	Copenhagen	Denmark	Gentofte Stadion
28 July 1992	Copenhagen	Denmark	Gentofte Stadion
30 July 1992	Oslo	Norway	Valle Hovin
31 July 1992	Stockholm	Sweden	Café Opera
1 August 1992	Stockholm	Sweden	Stadion
4 August 1992	Helsinki	Finland	Olympiastadion
7 August 1992	Gothenburg	Sweden	Isstadion
8 August 1992	Gothenburg	Sweden	Isstadion
13 August 1992	Havířov	Czechoslovakia	Zimní stadion Havířov
14 August 1992	Pécs	Hungary	Lauber Dezső Sports Hall
20 August 1992	Vigo	Spain	Estadio Municipal de Balaidos
22 August 1992	Gijón	Spain	El Molinón
25 August 1992	Faro	Portugal	Estádio de São Luís
27 August 1992	Marbella	Spain	Estadio Municipal de Marbella
29 August 1992	Cáceres	Spain	Campo de Fútbol Principe Felipe
31 August 1992	Pamplona	Spain	Plaza De Toros
1 September 1992	Bilbao	Spain	Plaza De Toros Vista Alegre
3 September 1992	Bordeaux	France	Parc Lescure
5 September 1992	Nice	France	Stade de l'Ouest
7 September 1992	Milan	Italy	Forum Di Assago
8 September 1992	Milan	Italy	Forum Di Assago
9 September 1992	Milan	Italy	Forum Di Assago
10 September 1992	Milan	Italy	Forum Di Assago
11 September 1992	Verona	Italy	Arena di Verona
12 September 1992	Verona	Italy	Arena di Verona
14 September 1992	Florence	Italy	Stadio Del Baseball
16 September 1992	Rome	Italy	Paleur
17 September 1992	Rome	Italy	Paleur
19 September 1992	Cava de' Tirreni	Italy	Stadio Comunale
22 September 1992	Lyon	France	Halle Tony Garnier
23 September 1992	Lyon	France	Halle Tony Garnier
25 September 1992	Toulouse	France	Stade de Sapiac Montauban
26 September 1992	Toulouse	France	Stade de Sapiac Montauban
28 September 1992	Nîmes	France	Arènes de Nîmes
29 September 1992	Nîmes	France	Arènes de Nîmes
30 September 1992	Nîmes	France	Arènes de Nîmes
2 October 1992	Barcelona	Spain	Palau Sant Jordi
3 October 1992	Barcelona	Spain	Palau Sant Jordi
4 October 1992	Barcelona	Spain	Palau Sant Jordi
6 October 1992	Madrid	Spain	Plaza de Toros de Las Ventas
7 October 1992	Madrid	Spain	Plaza de Toros de Las Ventas
9 October 1992	Zaragoza	Spain	Estadio de la Romareda

== Setlist ==
Core songs

1. "Calling Elvis"
2. "Walk of Life"
3. "Heavy Fuel"
4. "Romeo and Juliet"
5. "The Bug"
6. "Private Investigations"
7. "Sultans of Swing"
8. "Your Latest Trick"
9. "On Every Street"
10. "Two Young Lovers"
11. "Telegraph Road"
12. "Money for Nothing"
13. "Brothers in Arms"
14. "Solid Rock"
15. "Wild Theme"

Additional songs

- "Tunnel of Love"
- "Planet of New Orleans"
- "I Think I Love You Too Much"
- "Iron Hand"
- "You and Your Friend"
- "Fade to Black"
- "Setting Me Up"
- "Long Highway"
- "Portobello Belle"
- "Why Worry"
- "When It Comes to You"
- "So Far Away"
