= On the Night =

1993 live album by Dire Straits

Live album by Dire Straits
- Released: 10 May 1993
- Recorded: May 1992
- Venues: Arena of Nîmes, Nîmes, France; Feijenoord Stadium, Rotterdam, Netherlands
- Length: 75:33
- Labels: Vertigo; Warner Bros.(US)
- Producers: Guy Fletcher, Neil Dorfsman, Mark Knopfler

Dire Straits chronology
On Every Street (1991)	On the Night (1993)	Encores (1993)

On the Night is the second live album by the British rock band Dire Straits, released on 10 May 1993 by Vertigo Records internationally, and by Warner Bros. Records in the United States. The album features many of the band's later hits, including the singles "Walk of Life" and "Money for Nothing". The cover art of the album features dishes of the Very Large Array in central New Mexico.

In November 2023, On the Night was included in the box set anthology Live 1978–1992.

== Recording ==
On the Night was recorded in May 1992 at Les Arenes in Nîmes, France, and at Feijenoord Stadion in Rotterdam, the Netherlands. Shows in Paris, France were also recorded for the album, but unused. All of these concerts were part of the On Every Street Tour, which included 216 shows in Europe, North America, and Australia, and sold 7.1 million tickets.

== Release ==
On the Night comprises two engagements, one from each of the European legs. The first was the three-night stint at the Feyenoord Stadium "De Kuip" in Rotterdam, the Netherlands, and the second a trio of shows at Les Arènes in Nîmes, France. The album was released on 10 May 1993 by Vertigo Records internationally, and by Warner Bros. Records in the United States. It was released on compact disc and cassette and pressed in very small numbers for a double LP vinyl record release.

A CD single for "Your Latest Trick" titled Encores, was released in the UK which included three additional recordings from the tour: "The Bug", "Solid Rock" and "Local Hero - Wild Theme".

The album was remastered and reissued with the rest of the Dire Straits catalogue in 1996 for most of the world outside the United States.

In November 2023, On the Night was included in the box set anthology Live 1978-1992, remastered and expanded to include tracks that were left off the original album. Guy Fletcher remixed the additional tracks "Sultans of Swing", "Fade to Black", "When It Comes to You", "I Think I Love You Too Much", "Two Young Lovers", "Tunnel of Love" and "Telegraph Road".

== Critical response ==
Professional ratings
Review scores
Source	Rating
Allmusic	(CD)

In his review for AllMusic, Stephen Thomas Erlewine gave the album two out of five stars, writing that the album "works sporadically, offering enough good material to interest fans but not enough to win back the commercial audience earned by Brothers in Arms."

== Track listing ==
=== Original Release ===
All tracks are written by Mark Knopfler, except "Money for Nothing", which is credited to Knopfler and Sting.

No.	Title	Length
1.	"Calling Elvis"	10:25
2.	"Walk of Life"	5:06
3.	"Heavy Fuel"	5:23
4.	"Romeo and Juliet"	10:05
5.	"Private Investigations"	9:43
6.	"Your Latest Trick"	5:35
7.	"On Every Street"	7:01
8.	"You and Your Friend"	6:48
9.	"Money for Nothing"	6:28
10.	"Brothers in Arms"	8:54
Total length:		75:33

=== 2023 Remaster ===
All tracks are written by Mark Knopfler, except "Money for Nothing", which is credited to Knopfler and Sting.

Disc 1
No.	Title	Length
1.	"Calling Elvis"	10:31
2.	"Walk of Life"	5:05
3.	"Heavy Fuel"	5:19
4.	"Romeo and Juliet"	10:07
5.	"Private Investigations"	9:41
6.	"Sultans of Swing"	11:51
7.	"Fade to Black"	4:14
8.	"Your Latest Trick"	5:28
9.	"When It Comes to You"	5:52
10.	"I Think I Love You Too Much"	6:49
Total length:		74:57

Disc 2
No.	Title	Length
1.	"You and Your Friend"	6:48
2.	"On Every Street"	6:52
3.	"Two Young Lovers"	5:10
4.	"Tunnel of Love"	15:39
5.	"Telegraph Road"	12:05
6.	"Money for Nothing"	6:22
7.	"Brothers in Arms"	8:57
Total length:		61:53

=== DVD Release ===
No.	Title	Length
1.	"Calling Elvis"
2.	"Walk of Life"
3.	"Heavy Fuel"
4.	"Romeo and Juliet"
5.	"The Bug"
6.	"Private Investigations"
7.	"Your Latest Trick"
8.	"On Every Street"
9.	"You and Your Friend"
10.	"Money for Nothing"
11.	"Brothers in Arms"
12.	"Solid Rock"
13.	"Local Hero - Wild Theme"

== Personnel ==
Dire Straits

- Mark Knopfler – lead guitar, lead vocals
- John Illsley – bass guitar, backing vocals
- Alan Clark – piano, organ, synthesizers
- Guy Fletcher – synthesizers, backing vocals

Other musicians

- Chris White – saxophone, flute, percussion, backing vocals
- Paul Franklin – pedal steel guitar
- Phil Palmer – guitar, backing vocals
- Danny Cummings – percussion, backing vocals
- Chris Whitten – drums

Production

- Guy Fletcher – producer
- Neil Dorfsman – producer, engineer, mixing
- Mark Knopfler – producer
- Ronald Prent – assistant engineer
- Peter Brandt – assistant engineer
- Appie van Els – assistant engineer
- Andre den Besten – driver, Eurosound Mobil 4
- Bob Ludwig – mastering
- Sutton Cooper – artwork
- Paul Cummins – artwork
- Ross Halfin – photography
- Mark Leialoha – photography
- Guido Karp – photography
- Roger Ressmeyer – photography (Science Photo Library)

== Video ==
On the Night

Video by Dire Straits
- Released: 11 May 1993 (VHS), 23 November 2004 (DVD)
- Recorded: May 1992
- Venues: Arena of Nîmes, Nîmes, France; Feijenoord Stadium, Rotterdam, Netherlands
- Genre: Roots rock
- Length: 94:00
- Label: Universal
- Producer: Paul Cummins

Professional ratings
Review scores
Source	Rating
Allmusic	(video)

On the Night video was released on 11 May 1993 by Universal Music internationally, and included all of the songs from the CD plus three additional tracks: "The Bug", "Solid Rock", and "Wild Theme". "The Bug" was placed between "Romeo and Juliet" and "Private Investigations", while the other two tracks were placed at the end. The three omitted tracks were released separately on the Encores EP. The concert film was released in a PAL-format DVD in the United Kingdom, VideoCD in the Netherlands, and a region-free NTSC DVD importable from Canada on 23 November 2004.

=== Track listing ===
All songs were written by Mark Knopfler, except where indicated.

No.	Title	Length
1.	"Calling Elvis"
2.	"Walk of Life"
3.	"Heavy Fuel"
4.	"Romeo and Juliet"
5.	"The Bug"
6.	"Private Investigations"
7.	"Your Latest Trick"
8.	"On Every Street"
9.	"You and Your Friend"
10.	"Money for Nothing" (Mark Knopfler, Sting)
11.	"Brothers in Arms"
12.	"Solid Rock"
13.	"Local Hero – Wild Theme"
Total length:		94:00

=== Personnel ===
Music

- Mark Knopfler – lead guitar, lead vocals
- John Illsley – bass guitar, backing vocals
- Alan Clark – piano, organ, synthesizers
- Guy Fletcher – synthesizers, backing vocals
- Chris White – saxophone, flute, backing vocals
- Paul Franklin – pedal steel guitar
- Phil Palmer – guitar, backing vocals
- Danny Cummings – percussion, backing vocals
- Chris Whitten – drums

Production

- Paul Cummins – producer
- Gilly Tarrant – assistant producer
- Graham Brennan – editor
- Christine Strand – live director
- Robert Collins – live sound engineer
- Chas Herington – lighting design
- Ian Baker – video post production
- Dave Southwood – video post production

== Charts ==
=== Weekly charts ===
Weekly chart performance for On the Night
Chart (1993)	Peak position
Australian Albums Chart	5
Austrian Albums Chart	1
Canadian RPM Albums Chart	33
Dutch Albums Chart	2
European Albums Chart	1
French Albums Chart	1
German Albums Chart	7
Hungarian Albums Chart	27
New Zealand Albums Chart	10
Norwegian Albums Chart	5
Portuguese Albums Charts	1
Swedish Albums Chart	14
Swiss Albums Chart	5
UK Albums Chart	4
US Billboard 200	116

=== Year-end charts ===
1993 year-end chart performance for On the Night
Chart (1993)	Rank
Austrian Albums Chart	28
Dutch Albums Chart	10
European Albums Chart	18
German Albums Chart	61
Spanish Albums Chart	15

== Certifications ==
Sales and certifications for On the Night
Region	Certification	Certified units/sales
Australia (ARIA)	Gold	35,000^{^}
Austria (IFPI Austria)	Gold	25,000^{*}
France (SNEP)	Platinum	300,000^{*}
Netherlands (NVPI)	Platinum	100,000^{^}
New Zealand (RMNZ)	Gold	7,500^{^}
Spain (Promusicae)	Platinum	100,000^{^}
Switzerland (IFPI Switzerland)	Gold	25,000^{^}
United Kingdom (BPI)	Gold	100,000^{‡}
^{*} Sales figures based on certification alone.^{^} Shipments figures based on certification alone.^{‡} Sales+streaming figures based on certification alone.
