= Brothers in Arms Tour =

1985–86 concert tour by Dire Straits

- World tour by Dire Straits
- Location: Europe; Asia; North America; Oceania
- Associated album: Brothers in Arms
- Start date: 25 April 1985
- End date: 26 April 1986
- Legs: 5
- No. of shows: 248

Dire Straits concert chronology
- Love over Gold Tour (1982–83); Brothers in Arms Tour (1985–86); On Every Street Tour (1991–92)

The Brothers in Arms Tour was a concert tour by British rock band Dire Straits. The tour promoted and supported the group's fifth album, Brothers in Arms, which was released in May 1985.

The tour started on 25 April 1985 in Split, Yugoslavia and ended on 26 April 1986 in Sydney, Australia. It included dates in the Balkans, Israel, Europe, North America, and Oceania. The tour included 248 concerts in 23 countries and 118 cities. More than two and a half million people attended the tour. With 900,000 tickets sold in Australia and New Zealand it was the biggest concert tour in Australasian music history, until it was overtaken in 2017–2018 by Ed Sheeran on his ÷ Tour.

== Description ==
The tour lineup included Mark Knopfler (guitar and vocals), John Illsley (bass, backing vocals), Alan Clark & Guy Fletcher (keyboards), Terry Williams (drums), Jack Sonni (rhythm guitar, backing vocals), and Chris White (saxophone, flute, tambourine, backing vocals).

During the tour, Dire Straits performed "Money for Nothing" with Sting and "Sultans of Swing" at the Live Aid concert at Wembley Stadium on 13 July 1985. Their performance was included on the DVD release of that event. The final concert on 26 April 1986 in Sydney, Australia was broadcast on television in a live "simulcast" event.

The band's concert of 10 July 1985 at Wembley Arena, in which they were accompanied by Nils Lofgren for "Solid Rock" and Hank Marvin joined the band at the end to play "Going Home" (the theme from Local Hero), was partially televised in the United Kingdom on The Tube on Channel 4 in January 1986. Although never officially released, bootleg recordings of the performance entitled Wembley does the Walk (2005) have been circulated. In addition, three soundboard recordings were made in San Antonio, Houston, and Ohio, which have also circulated as bootlegs.

Selected tracks from the San Antonio show at the Municipal Auditorium on the 16th August 1985 were officially released for the first time in May 2025, when 40th anniversary editions of the "Brothers In Arms" album were released. These appear on the five LP box set, and triple CD editions.

The Brothers in Arms Tour consisted of four legs:

- Europe and Israel
- North America
- Europe
- Australia and New Zealand

== Tour dates ==
List of 1985 concerts
Date (1985)	City	Country	Venue
25 April	Split	Yugoslavia	Gripe
30 April	Jerusalem	Israel	Sultanpool
1 May	Tel Aviv	Israel	City Park
2 May	Tel Aviv	Israel	City Park
6 May	Athens	Greece	Sportspalace
7 May	Athens	Greece	Sportspalace
8 May	Montreux	Switzerland	Golden Rose Festival
9 May	Montreux	Switzerland	Golden Rose Festival
10 May	Belgrade	Yugoslavia	Pioneer Hall
11 May	Belgrade	Yugoslavia	Pioneer Hall
12 May	Zagreb	Yugoslavia	Dom Sportova
13 May	Ljubljana	Yugoslavia	Tivoli Hall
14 May	Graz	Austria	Eishalle
15 May	Vienna	Austria	Stadthalle
16 May	Brno	Czechoslovakia	Stadion Za Lužánkami
17 May	Budapest	Hungary	Sportshall
18 May	Budapest	Hungary	Sportshall
19 May	Budapest	Hungary	Sportshall
20 May	Budapest	Hungary	Sportshall
22 May	Eindhoven	Netherlands	P.O.C.
23 May	Arnhem	Netherlands	Rijnhal
24 May	Amsterdam	Netherlands	Jaap Edenhal
25 May	Rotterdam	Netherlands	Ahoy
26 May	Genk	Belgium	Limburghal
27 May	Brussels	Belgium	Forêt Nationale
28 May	Caen	France	Palais des Sports
29 May	Brest	France	Parc De Penfeld
30 May	Nantes	France	La Beaujoire
31 May	Bordeaux	France	Patinoire
1 June	Bilbao	Spain	Plaza de Toros Vista Alegre
3 June	Madrid	Spain	Estadio Román Valero
5 June	Barcelona	Spain	Municipal Velodrome
6 June	Barcelona	Spain	Municipal Velodrome
7 June	Toulouse	France	Palais des Sports
8 June	Toulouse	France	Palais des Sports
10 June	Monaco		Stade Louis II
11 June	Orange	France	Theatre antique d'Orange
12 June	Grenoble	France	Palais des Sports
13 June	Geneva	Switzerland	Patinoire
14 June	Geneva	Switzerland	Patinoire
15 June	Geneva	Switzerland	Patinoire
16 June	Zürich	Switzerland	Hallenstadion
17 June	Zürich	Switzerland	Hallenstadion
18 June	Basel	Switzerland	St. Jakobshalle
19 June	Basel	Switzerland	St. Jakobshalle
20 June	Dijon	France	Palais des Sports
21 June	Luxembourg	Luxembourg	Patinoire de Kockelscheuer
22 June	Deinze	Belgium	Brielpoort
23 June	Paris	France	Palais Omnisports de Bercy
24 June	Paris	France	Palais Omnisports de Bercy
25 June	Paris	France	Palais Omnisports de Bercy
28 June	Birmingham	England	National Exhibition Centre
29 June	Birmingham	England	National Exhibition Centre
30 June	Birmingham	England	National Exhibition Centre
1 July	Birmingham	England	National Exhibition Centre
2 July	Brighton	England	Brighton Centre
3 July	Brighton	England	Brighton Centre
4 July	London	England	Wembley Arena
5 July	London	England	Wembley Arena
6 July	London	England	Wembley Arena
7 July	London	England	Wembley Arena
8 July	London	England	Wembley Arena
9 July	London	England	Wembley Arena
10 July	London	England	Wembley Arena
11 July	London	England	Wembley Arena
12 July	London	England	Wembley Arena
13 July (Note: Performed at Wembley Stadium at 6 p.m. for Live Aid, later playing at Wembley Arena.)	London	England	Wembley Stadium
13 July	London	England	Wembley Arena
14 July	London	England	Wembley Arena
15 July	London	England	Wembley Arena
16 July	London	England	Wembley Arena
23 July	Montreal	Canada	Montreal Forum
24 July	Ottawa	Canada	Civic Centre
25 July	Ottawa	Canada	Civic Centre
26 July	Toronto	Canada	Varsity Arena
27 July	Toronto	Canada	Varsity Arena
28 July	Toronto	Canada	Varsity Arena
29 July	Toronto	Canada	Varsity Arena
1 August	Saint Paul	United States	Roy Wilkins Auditorium
2 August	Milwaukee	United States	Auditorium
3 August	Hoffman Estates	United States	Poplar Creek
4 August	Clarkston	United States	Pine Knob
5 August	Cuyahoga Falls	United States	Blossom Music Center
6 August	Pittsburgh	United States	Syria Mosque
7 August	Philadelphia	United States	Mann Music Center
8 August	Columbia	United States	Merriweather Post Pavilion
10 August	Atlanta	United States	Fox Theatre
11 August	Nashville	United States	Tennessee Performing Arts Center
13 August	Oklahoma City	United States	Zoo Amphitheater
14 August	Dallas	United States	Reunion Arena
15 August	Austin	United States	Coliseum
16 August	San Antonio	United States	Municipal Auditorium
17 August	Houston	United States	Southern Star Amphitheatre
3 September	Morrison	United States	Red Rocks Amphitheatre
4 September	Morrison	United States	Red Rocks Amphitheatre
6 September	Tempe	United States	Activity Centre
7 September	San Diego	United States	State University
8 September	Costa Mesa	United States	Pacific Amphitheatre
9 September	Los Angeles	United States	Greek Theatre
10 September	Los Angeles	United States	Greek Theatre
11 September	Los Angeles	United States	Greek Theatre
12 September	Los Angeles	United States	Greek Theatre
13 September	San Francisco	United States	Concord Pavilion
14 September	San Francisco	United States	Concord Pavilion
15 September	Sacramento	United States	California Exposition
17 September	Portland	United States	Civic Auditorium
18 September	Portland	United States	Civic Auditorium
19 September	Seattle	United States	Seattle Center Coliseum
20 September	Seattle	United States	Seattle Center Coliseum
21 September	Vancouver	Canada	War Memorial Gym
22 September	Victoria	Canada	Memorial Arena
23 September	Vancouver	Canada	Pacific Coliseum
24 September	Edmonton	Canada	Northlands Coliseum
25 September	Calgary	Canada	Olympic Saddledome
26 September	Edmonton	Canada	Northlands Coliseum
27 September	Calgary	Canada	Olympic Saddledome
1 October	New York City	United States	Radio City Music Hall
2 October	New York City	United States	Radio City Music Hall
3 October	New York City	United States	Radio City Music Hall
4 October	Providence	United States	Civic Center
5 October	Boston	United States	Wang Theatre
6 October	Boston	United States	Wang Theatre
7 October	Portland	United States	Cumberland County Civic Center
8 October	Boston	United States	Boston Garden
9 October	Hartford	United States	Hartford Civic Center
10 October	Hartford	United States	Hartford Civic Center
11 October	Uniondale	United States	Nassau Coliseum
12 October	New York City	United States	Madison Square Garden
13 October	East Rutherford	United States	Meadowlands Arena
22 October	Drammen	Norway	Drammenshallen
23 October	Drammen	Norway	Drammenshallen
24 October	Stockholm	Sweden	Café Opera
25 October	Stockholm	Sweden	Johanneshov
26 October	Stockholm	Sweden	Johanneshov
28 October	Helsinki	Finland	Ice Hall
29 October	Helsinki	Finland	Ice Hall
31 October	Brøndbyvester	Denmark	Brøndbyhallen
1 November	Brøndbyvester	Denmark	Brøndbyhallen
2 November	Hamburg	West Germany	Alsterdorfer Sporthalle
3 November	Groningen	Netherlands	Martinihal
4 November	Hanover	West Germany	Eilenriedehalle
5 November	West Berlin	West Germany	Deutschlandhalle
7 November	Vienna	Austria	Stadthalle
8 November	Munich	West Germany	Basketball-Halle
9 November	Wels	Austria	Eishalle
10 November	Graz	Austria	Eishalle
11 November	Linz	Austria	Sporthalle
12 November	Innsbruck	Austria	Olympic Hall
14 November	Lyon	France	Parc Des Expositions
15 November	Clermont-Ferrand	France	Maison Des Sports
18 November	Nuremberg	West Germany	Frankenhalle
19 November	Stuttgart	West Germany	Hanns-Martin-Schleyer-Halle
20 November	Frankfurt	West Germany	Festhalle
21 November	Cologne	West Germany	Sporthalle
22 November	Essen	West Germany	Grugahalle
23 November	Leiden	Netherlands	Groenoordhal
24 November	Leiden	Netherlands	Groenoordhal
25 November	Brussels	Belgium	Forêt Nationale
27 November	Paris	France	Palais Omnisports de Bercy
28 November	Paris	France	Palais Omnisports de Bercy
29 November	Paris	France	Palais Omnisports de Bercy
30 November	Paris	France	Palais Omnisports de Bercy
3 December	Newcastle upon Tyne	England	Newcastle City Hall
4 December	Newcastle upon Tyne	England	Newcastle City Hall
5 December	Newcastle upon Tyne	England	Newcastle City Hall
6 December	Newcastle upon Tyne	England	Newcastle City Hall
7 December	Manchester	England	Manchester Apollo
8 December	Manchester	England	Manchester Apollo
9 December	Manchester	England	Manchester Apollo
10 December	Manchester	England	Manchester Apollo
11 December	Deeside	England	Deeside Leisure Centre
12 December	Deeside	England	Deeside Leisure Centre
13 December	Shepton Mallet	England	Showering Pavilion
14 December	Shepton Mallet	England	Showering Pavilion
15 December	Birmingham	England	National Exhibition Centre
16 December	Birmingham	England	National Exhibition Centre
17 December	London	England	Hammersmith Odeon
18 December	London	England	Hammersmith Odeon
19 December	London	England	Hammersmith Odeon
20 December	London	England	Hammersmith Odeon
21 December	London	England	Hammersmith Odeon
22 December	London	England	Hammersmith Odeon
23 December	London	England	Hammersmith Odeon
29 December	Edinburgh	Scotland	Edinburgh Playhouse
30 December	Edinburgh	Scotland	Edinburgh Playhouse
31 December	Edinburgh	Scotland	Edinburgh Playhouse

List of 1986 concerts
Date (1986)	City	Country	Venue
7 February	Hobart	Australia	KGV Oval
8 February	Hobart	Australia	KGV Oval
12 February	Adelaide	Australia	Football Park
14 February	Melbourne	Australia	Melbourne Sports and Entertainment Centre
15 February	Melbourne	Australia	Melbourne Sports and Entertainment Centre
16 February	Melbourne	Australia	Melbourne Sports and Entertainment Centre
17 February	Melbourne	Australia	Melbourne Sports and Entertainment Centre
18 February	Melbourne	Australia	Melbourne Sports and Entertainment Centre
19 February	Melbourne	Australia	Melbourne Sports and Entertainment Centre
20 February	Melbourne	Australia	Melbourne Sports and Entertainment Centre
21 February	Melbourne	Australia	Melbourne Sports and Entertainment Centre
22 February	Melbourne	Australia	Melbourne Sports and Entertainment Centre
23 February	Melbourne	Australia	Melbourne Sports and Entertainment Centre
24 February	Melbourne	Australia	Sidney Myer Music Bowl
25 February	Melbourne	Australia	Sidney Myer Music Bowl
26 February	Melbourne	Australia	Olympic Park Stadium
1 March	Auckland	New Zealand	Mount Smart Stadium
2 March	Auckland	New Zealand	Western Springs Stadium
4 March	Wellington	New Zealand	Athletic Park
7 March	Christchurch	New Zealand	Lancaster Park
10 March	Sydney	Australia	Sydney Entertainment Centre
11 March	Sydney	Australia	Sydney Entertainment Centre
12 March	Sydney	Australia	Sydney Entertainment Centre
13 March	Sydney	Australia	Sydney Entertainment Centre
14 March	Sydney	Australia	Sydney Entertainment Centre
15 March	Sydney	Australia	Sydney Entertainment Centre
16 March	Sydney	Australia	Sydney Entertainment Centre
17 March	Sydney	Australia	Sydney Entertainment Centre
18 March	Sydney	Australia	Sydney Entertainment Centre
19 March	Sydney	Australia	Sydney Entertainment Centre
20 March	Sydney	Australia	Sydney Entertainment Centre
21 March	Sydney	Australia	Sydney Entertainment Centre
22 March	Sydney	Australia	Sydney Entertainment Centre
23 March	Sydney	Australia	Sydney Cricket Ground
24 March	Sydney	Australia	Sydney Entertainment Centre
25 March	Sydney	Australia	Sydney Entertainment Centre
27 March	Brisbane	Australia	Queen Elizabeth II Jubilee Sports Centre
29 March	Rockhampton	Australia	Rugby Park
31 March	Mackay	Australia	Mackay Showgrounds
2 April	Townsville	Australia	Townsville Showground
4 April	Cairns	Australia	Cairns Showgrounds
8 April	Darwin	Australia	Darwin Showgrounds
11 April	Ularu	Australia	Uluṟu-Kata Tjuṯa National Park
13 April	Perth	Australia	Perth Entertainment Centre
14 April	Perth	Australia	Perth Entertainment Centre
15 April	Perth	Australia	Perth Entertainment Centre
16 April	Perth	Australia	Perth Entertainment Centre
17 April	Perth	Australia	Perth Entertainment Centre
18 April	Perth	Australia	Perth Entertainment Centre
19 April	Perth	Australia	Perth Entertainment Centre
20 April	Perth	Australia	Perth Entertainment Centre
23 April	Sydney	Australia	Sydney Entertainment Centre
24 April	Sydney	Australia	Sydney Entertainment Centre
25 April	Sydney	Australia	Sydney Entertainment Centre
26 April	Sydney	Australia	Sydney Entertainment Centre

== Setlists ==
- 25 April 1985 (Split) - "Ride Across the River", "Expresso Love", "So Far Away", "Romeo and Juliet", "Private Investigations", "Sultans of Swing", "Walk of Life", "Why Worry", "Six Blade Knife", "The Man's Too Strong", "Two Young Lovers", "Money for Nothing", "Portobello Belle", "Wild West End", "Tunnel of Love", "Brothers in Arms", "Solid Rock"
- 13 May 1985 (Ljubljana) - "Ride Across the River", "Expresso Love", "So Far Away", "Romeo and Juliet", "Private Investigations", "Sultans of Swing", "Why Worry", "Walk of Life", "Two Young Lovers", "The Man's Too Strong", "Money for Nothing", "Wild West End", "Tunnel of Love", "Solid Rock", "Going Home: Theme from Local Hero"
- 16 May 1985 (Brno) - "Ride Across the River", "Expresso Love", "So Far Away", "Romeo and Juliet", "Private Investigations", "Sultans of Swing", "Why Worry", "Walk of Life", "Two Young Lovers", "The Man's Too Strong", "Money for Nothing", "Wild West End", "Tunnel of Love", "Brothers in Arms", "Solid Rock", "Going Home: Theme from Local Hero"
- North American Leg - "Ride Across the River", "Expresso Love", "One World", "Romeo and Juliet", "Private Investigations", "Sultans of Swing", "Why Worry", "Walk of Life", "Two Young Lovers", "Money for Nothing", "Wild West End", "Tunnel of Love", "Brothers in Arms", "Solid Rock", "Going Home: Theme from Local Hero"
- 26 April 1986 (Sydney) - "Ride Across the River", "Expresso Love", "Industrial Disease", "So Far Away", "Romeo and Juliet", "Private Investigations", "Sultans of Swing", "Why Worry", "Your Latest Trick", "Walk of Life", "Two Young Lovers", "Money for Nothing", "Tunnel of Love", "Brothers in Arms", "Solid Rock", "Going Home: Theme from Local Hero"
