= Encores (EP) =

1993 EP by Dire Straits

EP by Dire Straits
- Released: 10 May 1993
- Length: 20:44
- Label: Vertigo
- Producer: Guy Fletcher; Mark Knopfler; Neil Dorfsman

Dire Straits chronology
On the Night (1993)	Encores (1993)	Live at the BBC (1995)

Professional ratings
Review scores
Source	Rating
AllMusic	2/5 stars

Encores is a live extended play (EP) by British rock band Dire Straits, released on 10 May 1993, simultaneously with the release of their live album, On the Night. Although it was an EP, it charted on the singles charts of several countries. In France, Portugal and Spain, it debuted at number one. It was the band's final release prior to their official dissolution in 1995, when Mark Knopfler decided to embark on a solo career.

In November 2023, Encores was included in the box set anthology, Live 1978-1992

== Track listings ==
All tracks written by Mark Knopfler.

1. "Your Latest Trick" – 5:41
2. "The Bug" – 5:24
3. "Solid Rock" – 5:20
4. "Local Hero (Wild Theme)" – 4:19

== Charts ==
=== Weekly charts ===
Chart (1993)	Peak position
Australia (ARIA)	47
Austria (Ö3 Austria Top 40)	19
Belgium (Ultratop 50 Flanders)	18
Denmark (IFPI)	5
Europe (Eurochart Hot 100)	5
Finland (Suomen virallinen lista)	18
France (SNEP)	1
Germany (GfK)	34
Netherlands (Dutch Top 40)	4
Netherlands (Single Top 100)	3
Norway (VG-lista)	10
Portugal (AFP)	1
Spain (AFYVE)	1
Switzerland (Schweizer Hitparade)	20
UK Singles (OCC)	31

=== Year-end charts ===
Chart (1993)	Position
Europe (Eurochart Hot 100)	24
Netherlands (Dutch Top 40)	49
Netherlands (Single Top 100)	10

== Release history ==
Region	Date	Format(s)	Label(s)	Ref.
United Kingdom	10 May 1993	12-inch vinyl; CD; cassette	Vertigo	
Australia	17 May 1993	CD	Vertigo	
Japan	25 June 1993	CD	Vertigo	
