= Shadowdance =

Shadowdance may refer to:

- Shadowdance (Shadowfax album), 1983
- Shadowdance (Chris White album), 1991
- Shadowdance (novel), a 1991 novel by Robin Wayne Bailey
