= Shadowdance (Chris White album) =

Studio album by Chris White
- Released: 1991
- Studio: Rooster Studios (West London, UK); Roundhouse Studios, Swanyard Studios and Pacific Studios (London, UK); Hit Compagniet (Oslo, Norway); Centerfield Studios (New York City, New York, USA)
- Genre: Jazz, Smooth Jazz
- Label: Bellaphon Records
- Producer: Danny Schogger

Shadowdance is the first solo album by English saxophonist Chris White, who had previously performed with Dire Straits and The Notting Hillbillies. The album was reissued in 1996 as Control.

== Track listing ==
1. "Control (Chris White, Danny Schogger) - 4:34
2. "Mr. Fats" (White, Schogger) - 4:12
3. "A New Day" (White, Andy Scott) - 4:18
4. "Shadowdance" (White, Jean-Paul Maunick) - 3:56
5. "Don't Take No" (White, Scott) - 4:08
6. "Jericho Walls" (White, Maunick, Scott) - 5:17
7. "Eve's Song" (White) – 4:07
8. "You Will" (White, Schogger) - 4:21
9. "Dreamtime" (White, Maunick) - 4:28
10. "Brilliant Silence" (White, Felix Krish) - 3:57
11. "A Way of Life" (White, Maunick, Andy Caine) - 4:59

== Personnel ==
- Chris White – alto saxophone (1, 5, 7), tenor saxophone (2–4, 9, 11), soprano saxophone (6, 10), electric saxophone (8)
- Danny Schogger – keyboards (1–3, 5, 7, 8), programming (7), acoustic piano (10)
- Jean-Paul Maunick – keyboards (4, 9, 11), programming (4, 9, 11), arrangements (4, 9, 11)
- Andy Scott – guitars (1, 2, 5), programming (6), arrangements (6)
- Hugh Burns – guitars (3)
- Mark Knopfler – guitars (6, 9)
- Rob Berry – guitars (7)
- Pino Palladino – bass (2)
- Felix Krish – bass (5, 8, 10), keyboards (10), programming (10)
- Gary Husband – drums (3, 5, 6, 8, 10)
- Danny Cummings – percussion (1–3, 5, 8, 10)
- Mike Mainieri – vibraphone (9)
- Sam Brown – vocals (5, 8), backing vocals (11)
- Andy Caine – vocals (5, 8, 11), backing vocals (11)
- Brian Powell – vocals (5, 8), backing vocals (11)

=== Production ===
- Danny Schogger – producer
- Ulf Holland – mixing
- Martin Russell – mixing
- Nick Hopkins – recording (7)
- Morten Eik – photography
- Jørn Dalchow – sleeve design
