= On Every Street =

Studio album by Dire Straits
- Released: 9 September 1991
- Recorded: November 1990 – May 1991
- Studios: AIR (London, UK)
- Genre: Roots rock
- Length: 60:16
- Labels: Vertigo; Warner Bros. (US)
- Producers: Mark Knopfler; Dire Straits

Dire Straits chronology
Money for Nothing (1988)	On Every Street (1991)	On the Night (1993)

Singles from On Every Street
- 1. "Calling Elvis" Released: 19 August 1991; 2. "Heavy Fuel" Released: 21 October 1991; 3. "On Every Street" Released: 10 February 1992; 4. "The Bug" Released: 15 June 1992; 5. "You and Your Friend" Released: November 1992 (EU); 6. "Ticket to Heaven" Released: June 1994 (Netherlands)

Professional ratings
Review scores
Source	Rating
AllMusic	2/5 stars
Encyclopedia of Popular Music	3/5 stars
Entertainment Weekly	C−
The Great Rock Discography	5/10
MusicHound	1/5
NME	6/10
Pitchfork	5.2/10
Rolling Stone	3/5 stars
The Rolling Stone Album Guide	4/5 stars
Select	2/5

On Every Street is the sixth and final studio album by British rock band Dire Straits, released on 9 September 1991 by Vertigo Records internationally, and by Warner Bros. Records in the United States. The follow-up to the band's massively successful album Brothers in Arms, On Every Street reached the top of the UK Albums Chart and was also certified platinum by the RIAA.

== History ==
On Every Street was released more than six years after the band's previous album, Brothers in Arms. On Every Street reached number 12 in the United States and number one in the United Kingdom and numerous European countries. The album was produced by Mark Knopfler and Dire Straits.

By this time, the band consisted of Knopfler, John Illsley, Alan Clark and Guy Fletcher, and the album features session musicians including Chris White, Paul Franklin, Phil Palmer, Danny Cummings and American drummer Jeff Porcaro from Toto, who was asked to play the band's subsequent world tour, although he declined because of other commitments, both with Toto and as a studio musician.

Dire Straits promoted the album with a 14-month world tour which comprised 216 shows in Europe, North America, and Australia, sold 7.1 million tickets, and lasted from August 1991 to October 1992. This was documented in the group's second live album, On the Night, which was recorded in May 1992 at Les Arenes in Nîmes, France, and at Feijenoord Stadion in Rotterdam, The Netherlands, and was released in May 1993.

Dire Straits disbanded permanently in 1995, after which Mark Knopfler pursued a solo career.

The album was remastered and reissued with the rest of the Dire Straits catalogue in 1996 for most of the world, except for the United States, where it was reissued on 19 September 2000.

== Song information ==
"Iron Hand" relates to the Battle of Orgreave during the 1984–1985 UK miners' strike, with Knopfler remarking on how the police charge on horseback into the crowd of striking miners had reminded him of the savagery of medieval times. The song also appeared on the compilation album Nintendo: White Knuckle Scorin' in the same year of its release.

== Track listing ==
All tracks are written by Mark Knopfler.

On Every Street CD track listing
No.	Title	Length
1.	"Calling Elvis"	6:26
2.	"On Every Street"	5:04
3.	"When It Comes to You"	5:02
4.	"Fade to Black"	3:49
5.	"The Bug"	4:18
6.	"You and Your Friend"	5:59
7.	"Heavy Fuel"	4:57
8.	"Iron Hand"	3:09
9.	"Ticket to Heaven"	4:26
10.	"My Parties"	5:32
11.	"Planet of New Orleans"	7:47
12.	"How Long"	3:53
Total length:		60:16

Note

- On some reissues of the album, "Heavy Fuel" is 5:10.

== Personnel ==
Dire Straits

- Mark Knopfler – vocals, guitars
- John Illsley – bass, backing vocals
- Alan Clark – keyboards, string conductor (9)
- Guy Fletcher – keyboards, backing vocals

Additional musicians

- Chris White – flute, saxophones
- Phil Palmer – guitars
- Vince Gill – guitar and backing vocals (5)
- Paul Franklin – pedal steel guitar, acoustic lap steel guitar (2,6)
- Jeff Porcaro – drums, percussion (except tracks 7 and 11)
- Manu Katché – drums and percussion (7, 11)
- Danny Cummings – percussion
- George Martin – string arranger and conductor (9)

Production

- Mark Knopfler – producer
- Dire Straits – producers
- Chuck Ainlay – engineer
- Bill Schnee – engineer
- Steve Orchard – assistant engineer
- Jack Joseph Puig – assistant engineer
- Andy Strange – assistant engineer
- Neil Dorfsman – mixing (1–6, 8–11)
- Bob Clearmountain – mixing (7)
- Avril Mackintosh – mix assistant
- Bob Ludwig – mastering at Masterdisk (New York City, New York)
- Jo Motta – project coordinator
- Sutton Cooper – design
- Paul Cummins – design
- Paul Williams – sleeve photography
- Ron Eve – guitar technician to Mark Knopfler

== Singles ==
On Every Street produced six singles:

1. "Calling Elvis"
2. "Heavy Fuel"
3. "On Every Street"
4. "The Bug"
5. "You and Your Friend" (released in France and Germany)
6. "Ticket to Heaven" (released in The Netherlands)

== Charts ==
=== Weekly charts ===
Chart (1991)	Peak position
Australian Albums (ARIA)	1
Austrian Albums (Ö3 Austria)	1
Dutch Albums (Album Top 100)	1
German Albums (Offizielle Top 100)	1
Hungarian Albums (MAHASZ)	12
New Zealand Albums (RMNZ)	1
Norwegian Albums (VG-lista)	1
Portuguese Albums (AFP)	1
Swedish Albums (Sverigetopplistan)	1
Swiss Albums (Schweizer Hitparade)	1
UK Albums (Official Charts)	1
US Billboard 200	12

=== Year-end charts ===
Chart (1991)	Position
Australian Albums (ARIA)	25
Austrian Albums (Ö3 Austria)	15
Dutch Albums (Album Top 100)	1
German Albums (Offizielle Top 100)	12
New Zealand Albums (RMNZ)	26
Swiss Albums (Schweizer Hitparade)	36

Chart (1992)	Position
Dutch Albums (Album Top 100)	34
German Albums (Offizielle Top 100)	39

=== Singles charts ===
Year	Song	UK	AUS	AUT	FRA	ITA	NLD	NOR	SWE	SWI	US Alt.	US Main. Rock
1991	"Calling Elvis"	21	8	8	7	3	4	2	6	2	25	3
1991	"Heavy Fuel"	55	26	—	32	22	—	—	—	—	22	1
1992	"On Every Street"	42	—	—	23	—	—	—	—	—	—	—
1992	"The Bug"	67	—	—	44	—	—	—	—	—	—	8
1992	"You and Your Friend"	—	—	—	49	—	—	—	—	—	—	—
1994	"Ticket to Heaven"	—	—	—	—	—	43	—	—	—	—	—

== Sales and certifications ==
Region	Certification	Certified units/sales
Australia (ARIA)	2× Platinum	140,000^{^}
Austria (IFPI Austria)	Platinum	50,000^{*}
Belgium (BRMA)	Platinum	50,000^{*}
Canada (Music Canada)	2× Platinum	200,000^{^}
Finland (Musiikkituottajat)	Platinum	90,664
France (SNEP)	Diamond	1,000,000^{*}
Germany (BVMI)	Platinum	500,000^{^}
Hong Kong (IFPI Hong Kong)	2× Platinum	40,000^{*}
Ireland (IRMA)	Platinum	15,000^{^}
Italy (FIMI) salea in 1991	2× Platinum	600,000
Italy (FIMI) sales since 2009	Gold	50,000^{*}
Malaysia	2× Platinum	50,000
Netherlands (NVPI)	2× Platinum	200,000^{^}
New Zealand (RMNZ)	Platinum	15,000^{^}
Norway (IFPI Norway)	Platinum	100,000
Portugal (AFP)	Platinum	40,000^{^}
South Africa (RISA)	2× Platinum	100,000^{*}
Spain (Promusicae)	4× Platinum	400,000^{^}
Sweden (GLF)	2× Platinum	200,000^{^}
Switzerland (IFPI Switzerland)	4× Platinum	200,000^{^}
United Kingdom (BPI)	2× Platinum	600,000^{^}
United States (RIAA)	Platinum	1,000,000^{^}
^{*} Sales figures based on certification alone.^{^} Shipments figures based on certification alone.
