= Industrial Disease (song) =

Single by Dire Straits

from the album Love over Gold
- B-side: "Badges, Posters, Stickers, T-Shirts"
- Released: November 1982
- Genre: Rock
- Length: 4:17 (single version); 5:48 (album version)
- Label: Vertigo Records
- Songwriter(s): Mark Knopfler
- Producer(s): Mark Knopfler

Dire Straits singles chronology
"Private Investigations" (1982)	"Industrial Disease" (1982)	"Twisting by the Pool" (1983)

"Industrial Disease" is a song by British rock band Dire Straits, written by Mark Knopfler. It appeared on the band's 1982 album Love over Gold. The song was released as a single in the United States and as a rare B-side to "Private Investigations" on cassette tape in the United Kingdom.

== Meaning ==
The song's title is a British term for work-related illness or disease, a frequent subject in British news media at the time. The significance of the phrase was obscure to listeners in the United States, where the term occupational disease is used instead. There is a double meaning in that, at the time, "industrial disease" referred to both an occupational illness and the decline of British industry.

The background and subject matter of the lyrics was ostensibly the decline of the British manufacturing industry in the early 1980s, describing strikes, clinical and economic depression, and societal dysfunction. However, the song is an extended metaphor, with the idea of the dehumanising routine and repetition of the nine-to-five itself as the real culprit of society's malaise. About halfway through the song, the narrator goes to the doctor, only to be told his own illness is diagnosed as industrial disease. The double meaning is maintained, however, as the doctor is "Dr. Parkinson". Dr. C. Northcote Parkinson, a British university professor of history also was the author of several popular satirical works on dysfunction in British institutions and organizations in the 1950s and 60s, of which the best known is Parkinson's Law.

A reference to "brewer's droop" as a medical condition is an in-joke, using a British colloquial term for alcohol-related erectile dysfunction to allude to Brewers Droop, a 1970s pub rock band in which songwriter Mark Knopfler and drummer Pick Withers had played prior to Dire Straits.

== Charts ==
Chart	Peak Date	Weeks on Chart	Peak Position
US Billboard Mainstream Rock Airplay	4 December 1982	18	9
US Billboard Hot 100	22 January 1983	4	75
