= You and Your Friend =

Single by Dire Straits

from the album On Every Street
- B-side: 'Ticket to Heaven"; (CD); "Badges, Posters, Stickers, T-Shirts"; (7")
- Released: 1992
- Genre: Roots rock, soft rock
- Length: 5:59
- Label: Vertigo Records
- Songwriter: Mark Knopfler
- Producer: Mark Knopfler

Dire Straits singles chronology
"The Bug" (1992)	"You and Your Friend" (1992)	"Ticket to Heaven" (1994)

"You and Your Friend" is the sixth track from the 1991 rock album On Every Street by the British rock band Dire Straits. The song was the fifth song to be released as a single, and the final single overall released by the band. The single was only released in France and Germany. A live rendition appeared towards the end of the On the Night album and DVD.

Mark Knopfler told in interview for Musician: "I just liked the line. About the time we recorded the first record I had a song called "Me and My Friends." It was a Southern boogie thing about playing in the band. I never recorded it because it never really... "You and Your Friend" just has that thing. I like keeping it open for people to use in a way that they want. If you make it specific you spoil it. The song could be just a solitary cry for some kind of support — are you going to come around to my way of thinking? It could be sexual. One of the guys saw it as a complicated love triangle. It could be anything. But in fact that came from just the resonance of "You and Your Friend" instead of "Me and My Friends"."
