= Your Latest Trick =

Single by Dire Straits

from the album Brothers in Arms
- B-side: "Irish Boy" "The Long Road"
- Released: 25 April 1986
- Studio: AIR (Salem, Montserrat)
- Genre: Jazz rock; soft rock
- Length: 6:34 (album version); 4:46 (original vinyl LP version); 4:10 (radio version)
- Label: Vertigo
- Songwriter: Mark Knopfler
- Producers: Neil Dorfsman; Mark Knopfler

Dire Straits singles chronology
| "Walk of Life" (1985) | "Your Latest Trick" (1986) | "Calling Elvis" (1991) |

"Your Latest Trick" is a song by the British rock band Dire Straits, the fourth track on their fifth studio album, Brothers in Arms (1985). It was released as the album's fifth and final single in April 1986 by Vertigo Records. It later appeared on the live album On the Night; the same live version is on Sultans of Swing: The Very Best of Dire Straits. The full-length studio album version was included on the compilation The Best of Dire Straits & Mark Knopfler: Private Investigations.

== Music ==
Randy Brecker played the trumpet intro on the CD version, but it is missing on the vinyl version. After that, there is a saxophone intro, played by Michael Brecker, who also plays the saxophone solo. Chris White played the saxophone part on the live version on the Brothers in Arms and On Every Street world tours.

A cover of the saxophone introduction was used as the theme music for the 1992-1997 TVB series File of Justice in Hong Kong. This version features an original bridge and interlude.

According to Classic Rock critic Paul Rees, the song was originally done at a faster, jazzier tempo, but Dire Straits' manager Ed Bicknell suggested slowing it down to the "stately bossa nova" that was released.

== Single release ==
"Your Latest Trick" was released as a 12" maxi single in April 1986 as the fifth and final single from the "Brothers in Arms" album in the UK, as well as in other selected territories including Brazil. The single did not have a US release. It peaked at #26 on the UK charts.

The other songs featured on the single were "Irish Boy" and "The Long Road," both credited as solo efforts by Mark Knopfler.

== Reception ==
Cash Box described the song as "bittersweet" and said that it has hints of Tina Turner's song "Private Dancer," which was written by Knopfler and originally intended for Dire Straits' previous album Love over Gold.

Spin wrote, "A sinewy sax intro from one of the Brecker brothers sets up perfectly the string of surreal city images Knopfler intones in his husky, Dylanesque drawl. Most likely Knopfler's recent work with Dylan on Infidels was inspirational."

Paul Rees rated "Your Latest Trick" to be Dire Straits' 10th greatest song, saying that it "stirs up the humid, smoky atmosphere of a Latino cantina at midnight."

== Track listings ==
- 7"
1. "Your Latest Trick"
2. "Irish Boy" by Mark Knopfler
3. "The Road" by Mark Knopfler
- 12" maxi
1. "Your Latest Trick" – 6:28
2. "Irish Boy" by Mark Knopfler – 4:36
3. "The Long Road" by Mark Knopfler – 7:13

== Charts ==
| Chart (1986) | Peak position |
|---|---|
| Ireland (Irish Singles Chart) | 6 |
| UK Singles Chart (OCC) | 26 |

| Chart (1993)^{1} | Peak position |
|---|---|
| Canada Top Singles (RPM) | 91 |
| Europe (European Hit Radio) | 37 |
| France (SNEP) | 1 |

^{1} EP "Your Latest Trick" / "Encores"

== Certifications ==
Certifications for "Your Latest Trick"
| Region | Certification | Certified units/sales |
|---|---|---|
| New Zealand (RMNZ) | Gold | 15,000^{‡} |
^{‡} Sales+streaming figures based on certification alone.
