= Calling Elvis =

Single by Dire Straits

from the album On Every Street
- B-side: "Iron Hand"; "Millionaire Blues"
- Released: 19 August 1991
- Length: 6:25 (album version); 4:37 (single version)
- Label: Vertigo; Warner Bros.
- Songwriter: Mark Knopfler
- Producer: Mark Knopfler

Dire Straits singles chronology
"Your Latest Trick" (1986)	"Calling Elvis" (1991)	"Heavy Fuel" (1991)

"Calling Elvis" is a song written by Mark Knopfler and performed by British rock band Dire Straits. It first appeared on the final studio album by the band, On Every Street (1991). It was released in August 1991 by Vertigo and Warner Bros. as the first single from that album, peaking at number 21 in the United Kingdom, and reaching the top 10 in numerous other countries. It was included on the 2005 compilation The Best of Dire Straits & Mark Knopfler: Private Investigations. A live version of the song also appears on the 1993 live album On the Night.

== Content ==
The song is about an Elvis fan who believes Elvis Presley is still alive, making references to many of his songs, including "Heartbreak Hotel", "Love Me Tender", "Love Me (Treat Me Like a Fool)", "Don't Be Cruel" and "Return to Sender", as well as the expression "Elvis has left the building". Mark Knopfler has been quoted as saying the idea came to him one day when he left his phone off the hook and his brother-in-law tried repeatedly to get hold of him. Upon finally doing so, the brother-in-law remarked Knopfler was harder to get hold of than Elvis Presley.

== Music video ==
The music video for "Calling Elvis" was jointly directed by Gerry Anderson of Thunderbirds fame and Steve Barron. It includes several members of the band represented in marionette form, as well as various Thunderbirds characters and a woman.

== Track listings ==
- 7-inch and cassette single

A. "Calling Elvis"
B. "Iron Hand"

- 12-inch and CD single
1. "Calling Elvis"
2. "Iron Hand"
3. "Millionaire Blues"
- US 7-inch single and Japanese mini-CD single

A. "Calling Elvis" – 6:25
B. "Millionaire Blues" – 4:23

== Charts ==
=== Weekly charts ===
Chart (1991)	Peak position
Australia (ARIA)	8
Austria (Ö3 Austria Top 40)	8
Belgium (Ultratop 50 Flanders)	2
Canada Top Singles (RPM)	4
Canada Adult Contemporary (RPM)	30
Denmark (IFPI)	2
Europe (Eurochart Hot 100)	2
Europe (European Hit Radio)	2
Finland (Suomen virallinen lista)	4
France (SNEP)	7
Germany (GfK)	8
Ireland (IRMA)	2
Italy (Musica e dischi)	1
Luxembourg (Radio Luxembourg)	3
Netherlands (Dutch Top 40)	2
Netherlands (Single Top 100)	4
New Zealand (Recorded Music NZ)	9
Norway (VG-lista)	2
Portugal (AFP)	2
Spain (AFYVE)	3
Sweden (Sverigetopplistan)	6
Switzerland (Schweizer Hitparade)	2
UK Singles (Official Charts)	21
UK Airplay (Music Week)	3
US Alternative Airplay (Billboard)	25
US Mainstream Rock (Billboard)	3

=== Year-end charts ===
Chart (1991)	Position
Belgium (Ultratop 50 Flanders)	35
Canada Top Singles (RPM)	38
Europe (Eurochart Hot 100)	28
Europe (European Hit Radio)	16
Germany (Media Control)	78
Netherlands (Dutch Top 40)	41
Netherlands (Single Top 100)	39
Sweden (Topplistan)	49

== See also ==
- List of European number-one airplay songs of the 1990s
