= Dire Straits =

British rock band

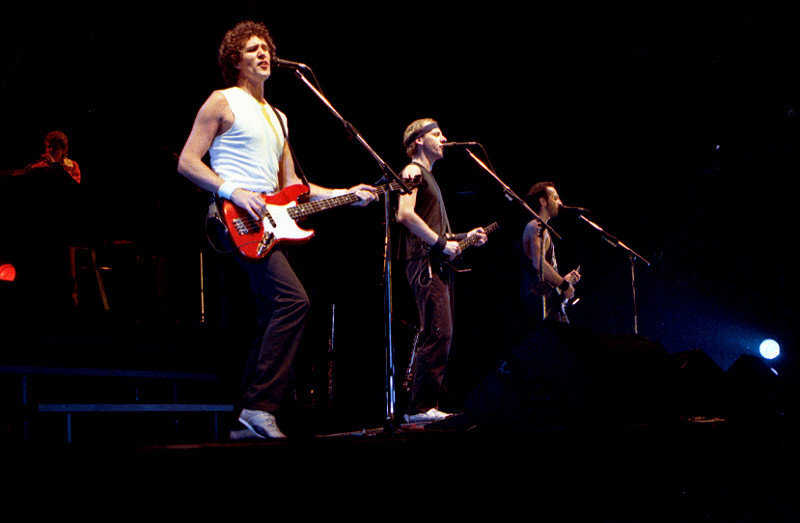
- Dire Straits performing at Drammenshallen in Drammen, Norway, October 1985

Background information
- Also known as: Café Racers
- Origin: London, England
- Genres: Roots rock; blues rock; pub rock; pop rock; progressive rock
- Works: Discography
- Years active: 1977–1988; 1990–1995
- Labels: Vertigo; Mercury; Warner Bros.
- Spinoffs: The Notting Hillbillies
- Past members: Mark Knopfler; David Knopfler; John Illsley; Pick Withers; Hal Lindes; Alan Clark; Terry Williams; Jack Sonni; Guy Fletcher
- Website: direstraits.com

Dire Straits were a British rock band formed in London in 1977 by Mark Knopfler (vocals, guitar), David Knopfler (guitar), John Illsley (bass), and Pick Withers (drums). The band was active from 1977 to 1988 and again from 1990 to 1995.

Their first single, "Sultans of Swing", from their 1978 self-titled debut album, reached the top 10 in the UK and US charts. It was followed by a series of hit singles including "Romeo and Juliet" (1981), "Private Investigations" (1982), "Industrial Disease" (1982), "Twisting by the Pool" (1983), "Money for Nothing" and "Walk of Life" (both 1985). Their most commercially successful album, Brothers in Arms (1985), has sold more than 30 million copies worldwide; it was the first album to sell a million copies on CD and is the tenth-best-selling album in UK history. According to the Guinness Book of British Hit Albums, as of 2005, Dire Straits had spent over 1,100 weeks on the UK Albums Chart, the fifth-most at that time.

Dire Straits drew from influences including country, folk, the blues rock of J. J. Cale, and jazz. Their stripped-down sound demonstrated a roots rock influence which emerged from pub rock. The band experienced several personnel changes, with Mark Knopfler and Illsley the only members to remain throughout its history. After their first breakup in 1988, Knopfler told Rolling Stone: "A lot of press reports were saying we were the biggest band in the world. There's not an accent then on the music, there's an accent on popularity. I needed a rest." They regrouped in 1990 and disbanded permanently in June 1995, after which Knopfler launched a solo career full-time. He has declined numerous reunion offers, and confirmed in April 2024 that he would never play with the group again.

Dire Straits were called "the biggest British rock band of the 80s" by Classic Rock magazine; their 1985–1986 world tour, which included a performance at Live Aid in July 1985, set a record in Australasia. Their final world tour from 1991 to 1992 sold 7.1 million tickets, making it the 6th most-attended concert tour of all time. The band won four Grammy Awards, three Brit Awards (including Best British Group twice) and two MTV Video Music Awards, among various others. They were inducted into the Rock and Roll Hall of Fame in 2018. Dire Straits have sold over 120 million records worldwide, including 60.4 million certified units, making them one of the best-selling music artists of all time.

== History ==
=== 1977–1979: Early years and first two albums ===
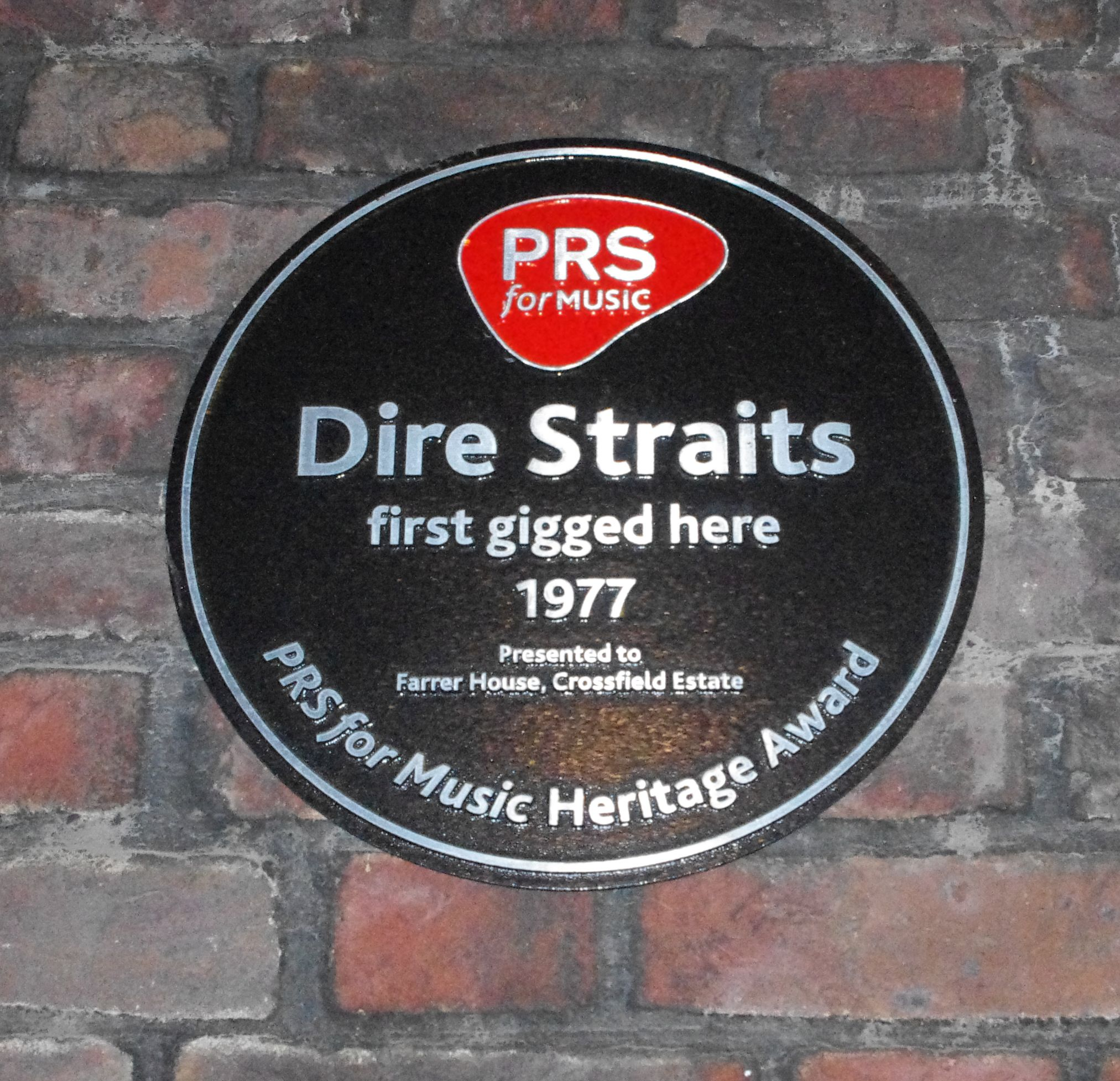
PRS for Music heritage plaque commemorating Dire Straits' first performance in Deptford, London

Brothers Mark and David Knopfler were born in Glasgow, Scotland, and grew up in Blyth in the northeast of England. With John Illsley and Pick Withers, from Leicester in the East Midlands, they formed Dire Straits in Deptford, south east London, in 1977. Withers was already a 10-year music business veteran, having been a session drummer for Dave Edmunds, Gerry Rafferty, Magna Carta and others through the 1970s. He was the house drummer at Rockfield Studios in Monmouthshire and was part of the group Spring, which recorded an album for RCA Records in 1971. At the time of the band's formation, Mark was working as an English teacher, Illsley was studying at Goldsmiths' College, and David was a social worker. Mark and Withers had both been part of the pub rock group Brewers Droop around 1973.

The new band was initially known as the Café Racers. The name Dire Straits was coined by a musician flatmate of Withers, allegedly thought up while they were rehearsing in the kitchen of a friend, Simon Cowe, of Lindisfarne. In 1977, the group recorded a five-song demo tape which included their future hit single "Sultans of Swing", as well as "Water of Love" and "Down to the Waterline". After a performance at the Rock Garden in 1977, they took a demo tape to MCA in Soho but were turned down. They sent a tape to DJ Charlie Gillett, presenter of Honky Tonk on BBC Radio London. The band simply wanted advice, but Gillett liked the music so much that he played "Sultans of Swing" on his show. Two months later, Dire Straits signed a recording contract with the Vertigo Records division of Phonogram Inc. In October 1977, the band recorded demo tapes of "Southbound Again", "In the Gallery" and "Six Blade Knife" for BBC Radio London; in November, demo tapes were made of "Setting Me Up", "Eastbound Train" and "Real Girl".

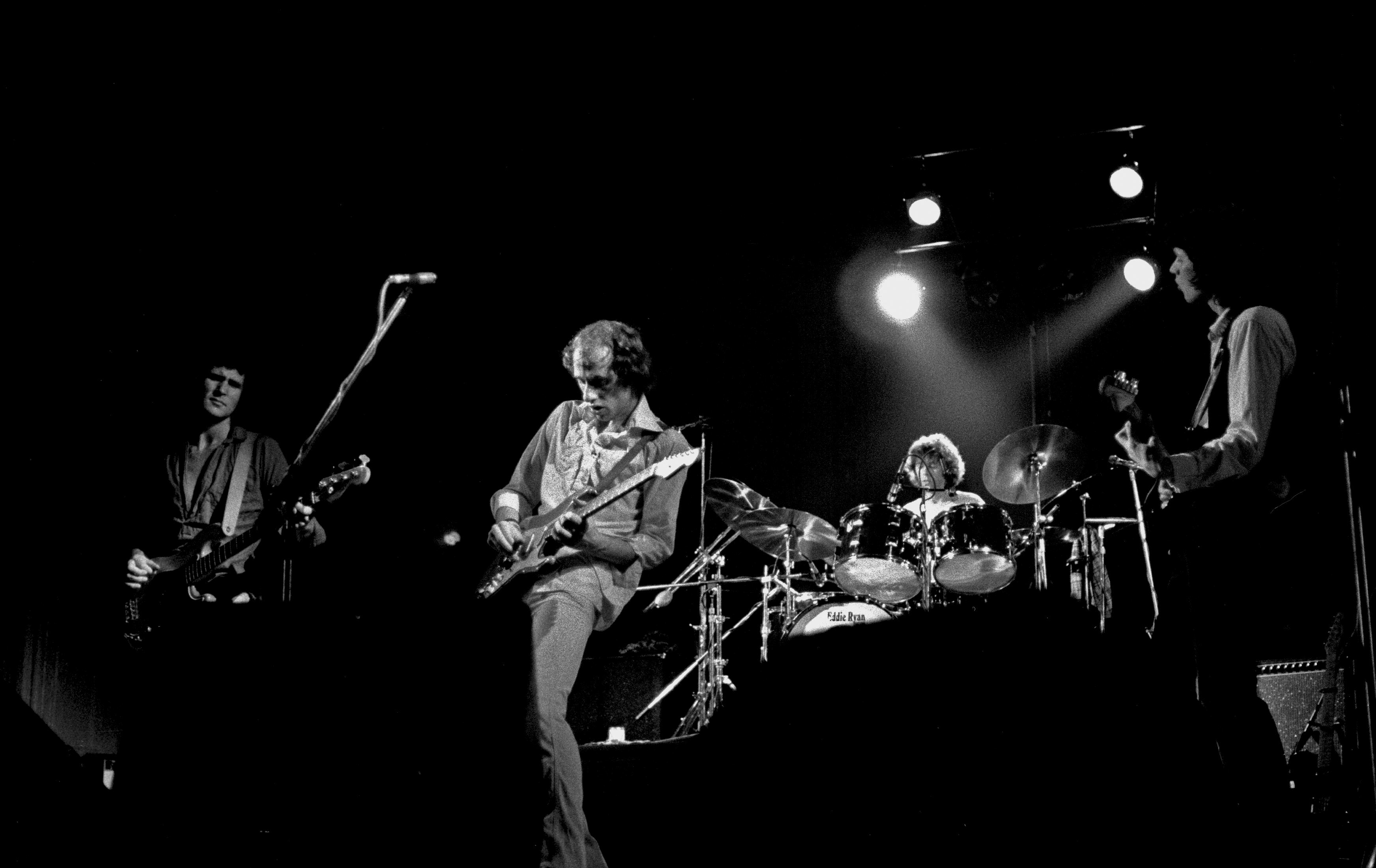
The original Dire Straits line-up in Hamburg, Germany (1978); L to R: John Illsley, Mark Knopfler, Pick Withers, and David Knopfler

The group's first album, Dire Straits, was recorded at Basing Street studios in Notting Hill, London, in February 1978, at a cost of £12,500. Produced by Muff Winwood, it was first released in the United Kingdom in June 1978 on Vertigo Records, then a division of Phonogram Inc. It came to the attention of A&R representative Karin Berg, working at Warner Bros. Records in New York City. She felt that it was the kind of music audiences were hungry for, but only one person in her department agreed at first. Many of the songs on the album reflected Mark Knopfler's experiences in Newcastle, Leeds and London. "Down to the Waterline" recalled images of life in Newcastle; "In the Gallery" is a tribute to Leeds sculptor/artist Harry Phillips (father of Steve Phillips); "Wild West End" and "Lions" were drawn from Knopfler's early days in the capital.

That same year, Dire Straits began a tour as opening band for Talking Heads, after the re-released "Sultans of Swing" started to climb the UK charts. This led to a United States recording contract with Warner Bros. Records; before the end of 1978, Dire Straits had released their self-titled debut worldwide. They received more attention in the US, but also arrived at the top of the charts in Canada, Australia and New Zealand. Dire Straits eventually went top 10 in every European country.

The following year, Dire Straits embarked on their first North American tour. They played 51 sold-out concerts over 38 days. "Sultans of Swing" scaled the charts to No. 4 in the US and No. 8 in the United Kingdom. The song was one of Dire Straits' biggest hits and became a fixture in the band's live performances. Bob Dylan, who had seen the band play in Los Angeles, was so impressed that he invited Mark Knopfler and drummer Pick Withers to play on his next album, Slow Train Coming.

Recording sessions for the group's second album, Communiqué, took place in December 1978 at Compass Point Studios in Nassau, Bahamas. Released in June 1979, Communiqué was produced by Jerry Wexler and Barry Beckett and went to No. 1 on the German album charts, with the debut album Dire Straits simultaneously at No. 3. In the United Kingdom, the album peaked at No. 5 in the album charts. Featuring the single "Lady Writer", the second album continued in a similar vein to the first and displayed the expanding scope of Knopfler's lyricism on the opening track, "Once Upon a Time in the West". In the coming year, however, this approach began to change, along with the group's line-up.

=== 1980–1984: Making Movies, Love Over Gold and other side projects ===
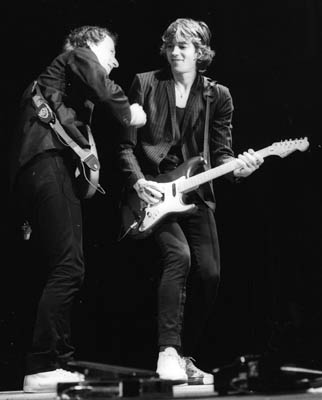
Mark Knopfler and Hal Lindes

In 1980, Dire Straits were nominated for two Grammy Awards for Best New Artist and Best Rock Vocal Performance by a Duo or Group for "Sultans of Swing". In July 1980, the band started recording tracks for their third album. Produced by Jimmy Iovine, with Mark Knopfler also sharing credit, Making Movies was released in October 1980. During the recording sessions, tensions between the Knopfler brothers reached a point where David Knopfler left the band for a solo career. The remaining trio continued the album, with session guitarist Sid McGinnis on rhythm guitar – although he was uncredited on the album – and Roy Bittan from Bruce Springsteen's E Street Band guesting on keyboards. After the recording sessions, keyboardist Alan Clark and Californian guitarist Hal Lindes joined Dire Straits as full-time members for the On Location tour of Europe, North America, and Oceania.

Making Movies received mostly positive reviews and featured longer songs with more complex arrangements, a style which would continue for the rest of the band's career. The album featured many of Mark Knopfler's most personal compositions. The most successful chart single was "Romeo and Juliet" (number 8 in the UK Singles Chart), a song about a failed love affair, with Knopfler's trademark in keeping personal songs under fictitious names. Although never released as a single, "Solid Rock" was featured in all Dire Straits' live shows from this point on for the remainder of their career, while the album's lengthy opening track, "Tunnel of Love", with its intro "The Carousel Waltz" by Richard Rodgers and Oscar Hammerstein II, was featured in the 1982 Richard Gere film An Officer and a Gentleman. Although "Tunnel of Love" reached only no. 54 in the UK when released as a single in 1981, it remains one of Dire Straits' most famous and popular songs and immediately became a favourite live staple, entering the band’s concert repertoire from this point onwards. Making Movies stayed in the UK Albums Chart for five years, peaking at No. 4. Rolling Stone ranked Making Movies number 52 on its list of the "100 Best Albums of the Eighties".

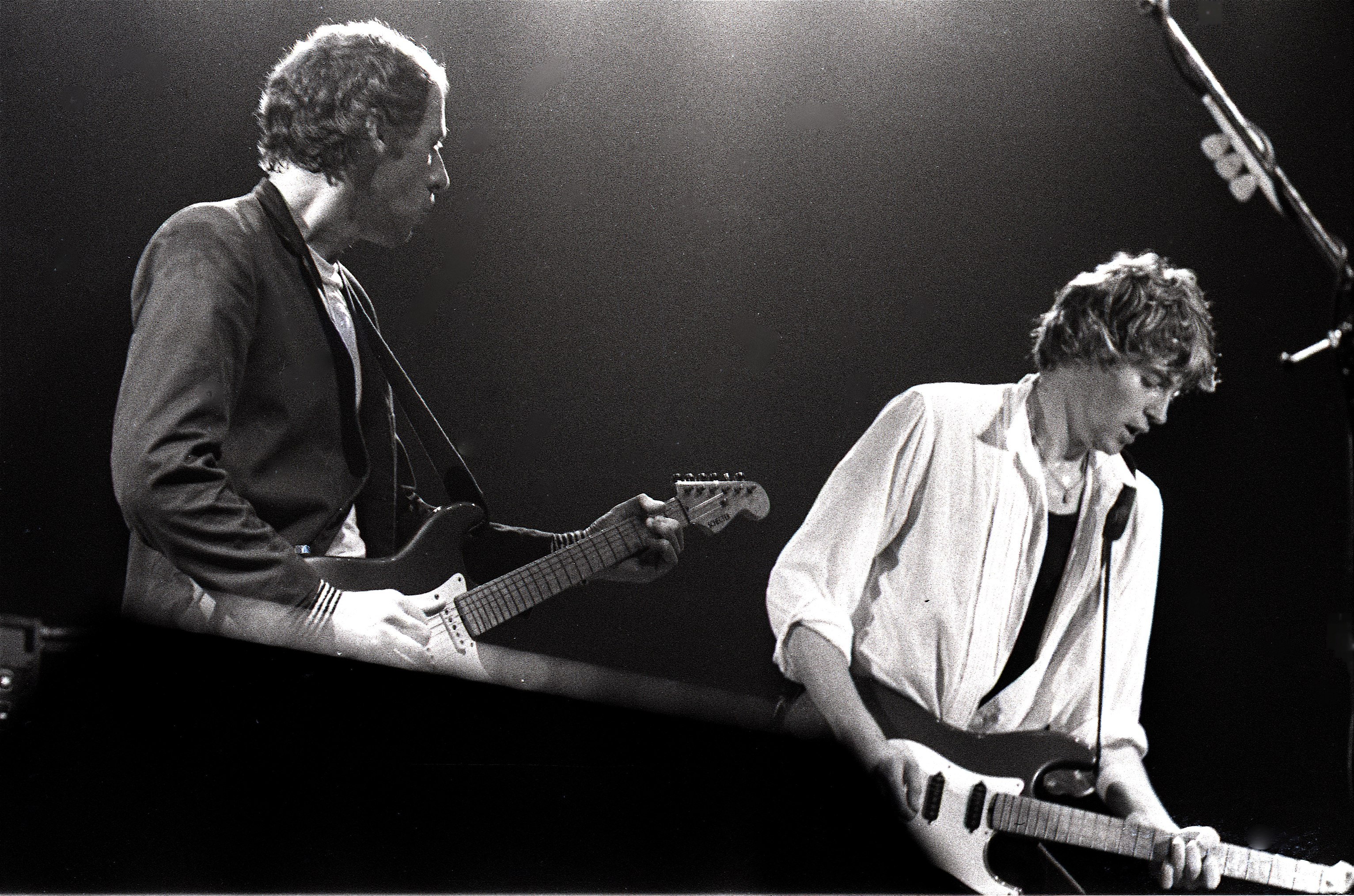
Knopfler and Lindes onstage in Amsterdam, June 1981

Dire Straits' fourth studio album, Love Over Gold, filled with lengthy passages that featured Alan Clark's piano and keyboard work, was well received when it was released in September 1982, going gold in America on the strength of the FM rock radio single "Industrial Disease". It spent four weeks at number one in the United Kingdom. The title was inspired by graffiti seen from the window of Knopfler's old council flat in London. The phrase was taken from the sleeve of an album by Captain Beefheart. Love Over Gold was the first Dire Straits album produced solely by Mark Knopfler, and its main UK chart hit, "Private Investigations", gave Dire Straits their first top 5 hit single in the United Kingdom, where it reached the number 2 position, despite its almost seven-minute length, and became another of the band's most popular live songs.

In other parts of the world, "Industrial Disease", a song that looks at the decline of the British manufacturing industry in the early 1980s, focusing on strikes, depression and dysfunctionality, was the main single from the album, particularly in Canada where it became a top 10 hit. As well as the title track and "It Never Rains", Love Over Gold featured the 14-minute "Telegraph Road". Also written by Knopfler during this period was "Private Dancer", which did not appear on the album, but was eventually given to Tina Turner for her comeback album of the same name. Love Over Gold reportedly sold two million copies during the first six weeks after its release. Shortly after the recording sessions of Love Over Gold, drummer Pick Withers left the band. His replacement was Terry Williams, formerly of Rockpile and a range of other Welsh bands, including Man.

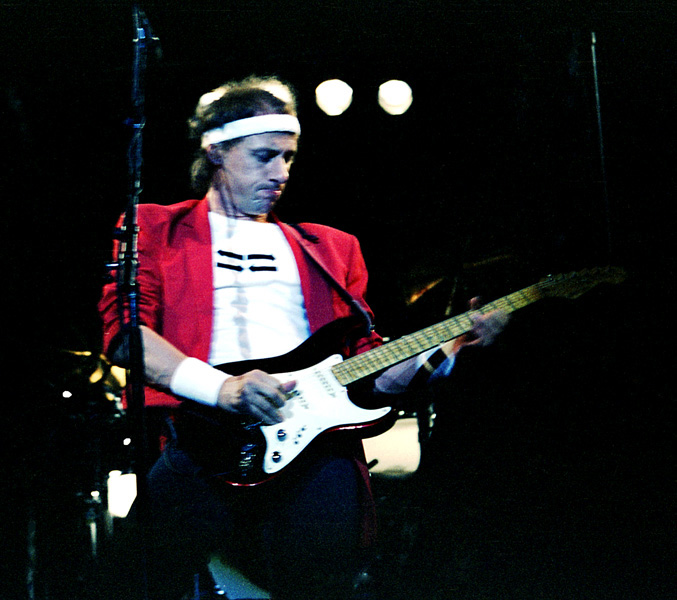
Knopfler in Zagreb, 1983

In January 1983, a four-song EP titled ExtendedancEPlay was released while Love Over Gold was still in the album charts. It featured the hit single "Twisting By the Pool", which reached the Top 20 in the UK and Canada. The band won Best British Group at the 1983 Brit Awards. Dire Straits embarked on the eight-month-long Love over Gold Tour, which finished with two concerts at London's Hammersmith Odeon on 22 and 23 July 1983. King Crimson saxophonist Mel Collins and session keyboardist Tommy Mandel, who had played with Bryan Adams since 1981, joined the live lineup to help Clark cover his increasingly detailed keyboard parts and arrangements. The double album Alchemy Live was a recording of excerpts from the final two concerts and was reportedly released without studio overdubs. It was released in March 1984, reaching the Top 3 in the UK Albums Chart.

During 1983 and 1984, Mark Knopfler was also involved with other projects outside of Dire Straits, some of which other band members contributed towards. Knopfler and Terry Williams contributed to Phil Everly´s and Cliff Richard´s UK hit single "She Means Nothing To Me", released in early 1983, and Knopfler had also expressed his interest writing film music, and after producer David Puttnam responded he wrote and produced the music score to the film Local Hero. The album was released in April 1983 and received a BAFTA Award nomination for Best Original Film Music the following year. Alan Clark contributed significantly, and other Dire Straits members Illsley, Lindes and Williams played on one track, "Freeway Flyer", while Gerry Rafferty sang lead vocals on "The Way It Always Starts". The closing track on the album and played during the credits in the film is the instrumental "Going Home: Theme of the Local Hero" which was released as a single, and remains popular among football fans, especially those of Knopfler’s hometown club, Newcastle United, as it is played as the team runs out before every home game. The track immediately became a popular live staple for Dire Straits, entering the band's repertoire from 1983 onwards.

"Local Hero" was followed in 1984 by Cal, which was also released on album and to which John Illsley and Terry Williams contributed, and Comfort and Joy, which also featured contributions from Williams. Also, during this time Knopfler produced Bob Dylan's Infidels, which also featured Alan Clark, as well as albums for Aztec Camera and Willy DeVille. Also in 1984, John Illsley released his first solo album, Never Told a Soul, to which Knopfler, Clark and Williams contributed. Knopfler also teamed up with Bryan Ferry to contribute lead guitar to one track from his solo album Boys and Girls, released in June 1985.

=== 1985–1986: Brothers in Arms and international success ===
At the end of 1984, Dire Straits began recording tracks at George Martin's AIR Studios in Montserrat for their upcoming fifth studio album, to be titled Brothers in Arms, with Mark Knopfler and Neil Dorfsman producing.

The recording sessions saw further personnel changes. Taking the place of Tommy Mandel, Guy Fletcher had joined Dire Straits full time so that the band had a permanent second keyboardist. Fletcher had previously worked as a session musician with Roxy Music and on Aztec Camera’s second album (released in 1984 and produced by Knopfler), and he had also worked with Knopfler on the Cal and Comfort and Joy soundtracks. While Clark mostly concentrated (although not exclusively) on piano and organ, Fletcher specialised in the additional broader synthesizer tones which Knopfler's expanding arrangements now favoured and demanded.

Although he was present during the early weeks of the sessions, Hal Lindes decided to leave the band early on during the recording of Brothers in Arms following social disagreements, with Knopfler once again taking on all guitar duties. Six weeks into the sessions, Terry Williams was sidelined and temporarily suspended from duties following disagreements and dissatisfaction with his drum approach. A feel-based drummer, Williams did not enjoy having to work with a click track, and neither Knopfler nor Dorfsman were happy with his playing in relation to the sound they wanted for the record. For recording purposes, Williams was temporarily replaced by jazz and session drummer Omar Hakim who re-recorded nearly all of the album's drum parts during a two to three day session before leaving for other commitments. Ultimately, Williams would be retained for future touring, while Hal Lindes was eventually replaced in December 1984 by Jack Sonni, a New York-based guitarist and longstanding friend of Knopfler (although Sonni's eventual contribution to the album would be minimal).

Released in May 1985, Brothers in Arms entered the UK Albums Chart at number 1, spent a total of 228 weeks in the charts, and sold over 4 million copies. It went on to become the best-selling album of 1985 in the UK. Brothers in Arms was similarly successful in the US, peaking at No. 1 on Billboard 200 for nine weeks, going multi-platinum and selling nine million copies there. The album spent 34 weeks at number 1 on the Australian ARIA Charts, and it remains the longest-running number one album in Australia.

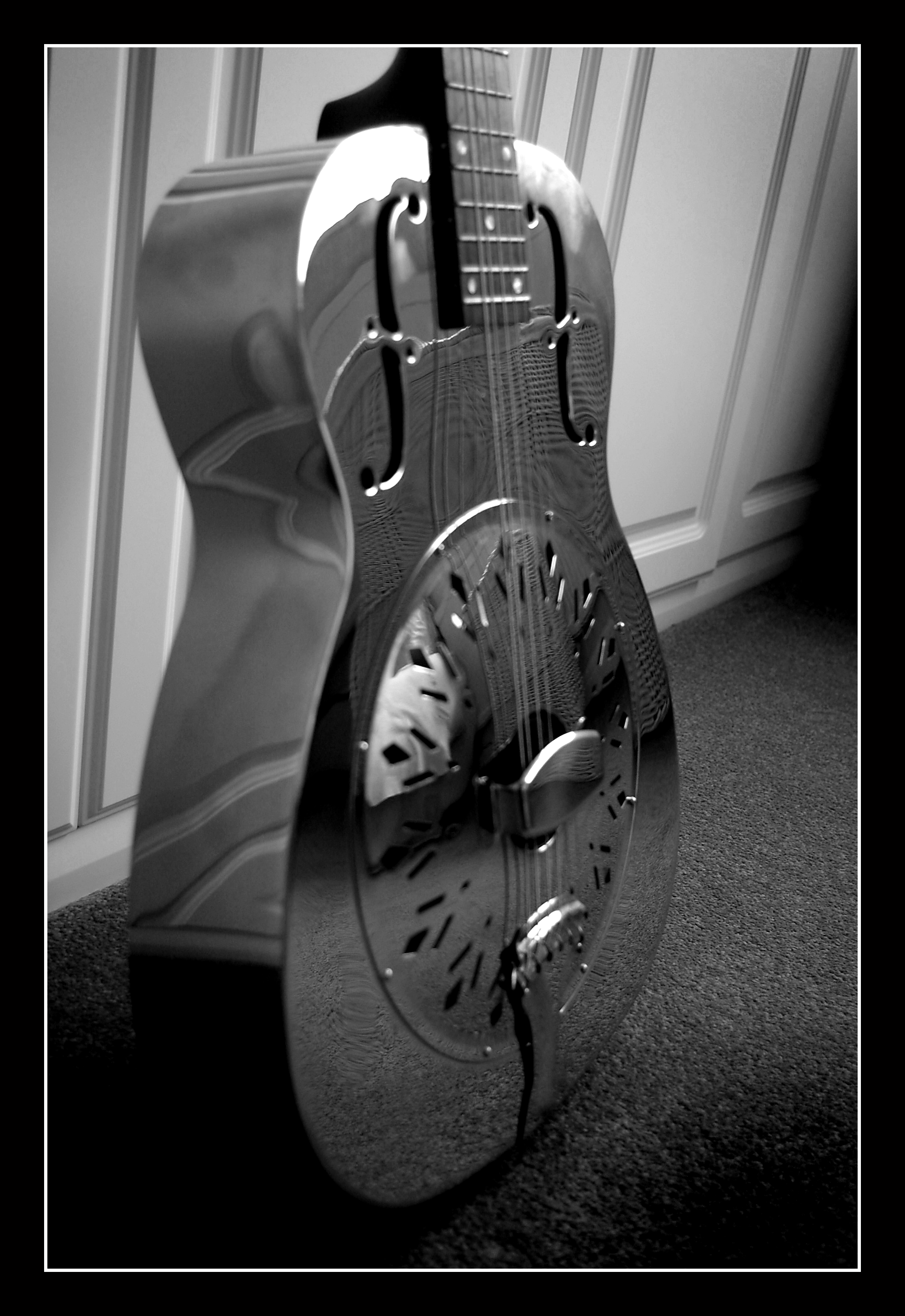
A National Style 0 resonator guitar features on the cover of Brothers in Arms. Knopfler also used the guitar in the 1981 single "Romeo and Juliet".

The album featured a more lavish production and overall sound than Dire Straits' earlier work and spawned several big chart singles: "Money for Nothing", which reached number 1 on the US Billboard Hot 100, and number 4 in the UK Singles Chart, "So Far Away" (No. 20 UK, No. 19 US), "Brothers in Arms" (No. 16 UK), "Walk of Life" (No. 2 UK, No. 7 US), and "Your Latest Trick" (No. 26 UK). "Money for Nothing" was the first video to be played on MTV in the UK and featured guest vocals by Sting, who is credited with co-writing the song with Mark Knopfler, although it was the inclusion of the melody from "Don't Stand So Close To Me" that triggered the copyright credit, as no lyrics were written by Sting. It also won a Grammy Award for Best Rock Performance by a Duo or Group with Vocal in February 1986.

Some sources cite Brothers in Arms as the first album recorded entirely digitally, but the history of commercially released all-digital recordings goes back to the early 1970s, and multitrack digital recorders were used for popular music albums by the late 1970s. Written during Britain's involvement in the Falklands War of 1982, the album's title track, "Brothers in Arms", deals with the senselessness of war. In 2007, the 25th anniversary of the war, Knopfler recorded a new version of the song at Abbey Road Studios to raise funds for British veterans who he said "are still suffering from the effects of that conflict." "Brothers in Arms" has become a favourite at military funerals. Reported to be the world's first CD single, it was issued in the UK as a promotional item distinguished with a logo for the tour, Live in '85, while a second to commemorate the Australian leg of the tour marked Live in '86. "Walk of Life", meanwhile, was nearly excluded from the album when co-producer Neil Dorfsman voted against its inclusion, but the band members outvoted him. The result was Dire Straits' most commercially successful hit single in the UK, peaking at number two.

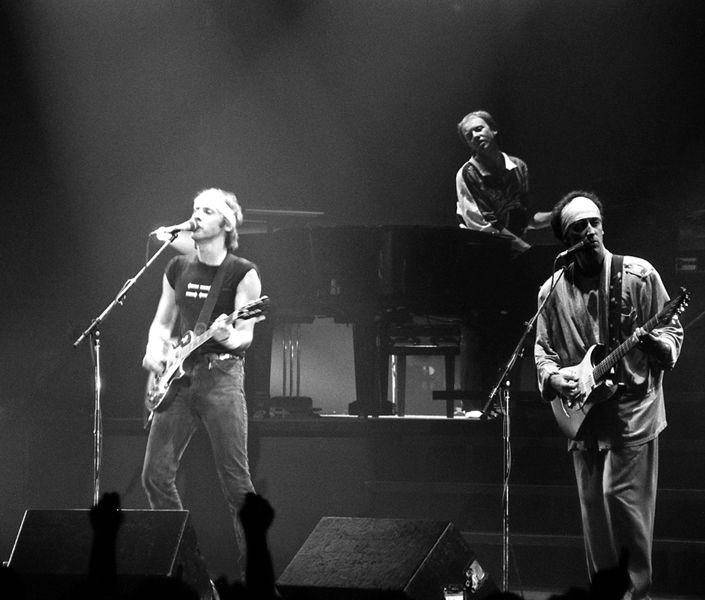
Dire Straits performing in Belgrade, Yugoslavia, (now Serbia) on 10 May 1985. Left to right: Mark Knopfler, Alan Clark, and Jack Sonni.

The album is listed in the Guinness Book of World Records as the first compact disc (CD) to sell a million copies, and it has been credited with popularising the CD format. The Guardian ranked the Brothers in Arms CD number 38 in their list of the 50 key events in rock music history. The album featured the full version of the "Money for Nothing" cut, rather than the LP version, and it also includes extended versions of all tracks on the first side of the LP, with the exception of "Walk of Life".

The 1985–1986 Brothers in Arms world tour which followed the album's release (with Sonni now fully in place as rhythm guitarist and Williams back on drums) was phenomenally successful, with over 2.5 million tickets sold. The tour included dates in Europe, Israel, North America, and Australia and New Zealand. The band, joined by saxophonist Chris White, played 248 shows in over 100 cities. The tour began on 25 April 1985 in Split, Croatia (then part of Yugoslavia). Following the opening show in Split, the band performed concerts in Israel, appearing at Sultan’s Pool in Jerusalem on 30 April 1985 and at Park HaYarkon in Tel Aviv in early May, before continuing the European leg of the tour.

While playing a 13-night residency at Wembley Arena in London, the band moved down the road to Wembley Stadium on the afternoon of 13 July 1985, to appear in a Live Aid slot, in which their set included "Money For Nothing" with Sting as guest vocalist. John Illsley states, "It was a very special feeling to be part of something so unique. Live Aid was a unique privilege for all of us. It’s become a fabulous memory." The tour ended at the Sydney Entertainment Centre, Australia, on 26 April 1986, where Dire Straits still holds the record for consecutive appearances at 21 nights. The band also made an impromptu attempt at the Australian folk song "Waltzing Matilda". With 900,000 tickets sold in Australia and New Zealand, it was the biggest concert tour in Australasian music history, until it was overtaken in 2017–2018 by Ed Sheeran.

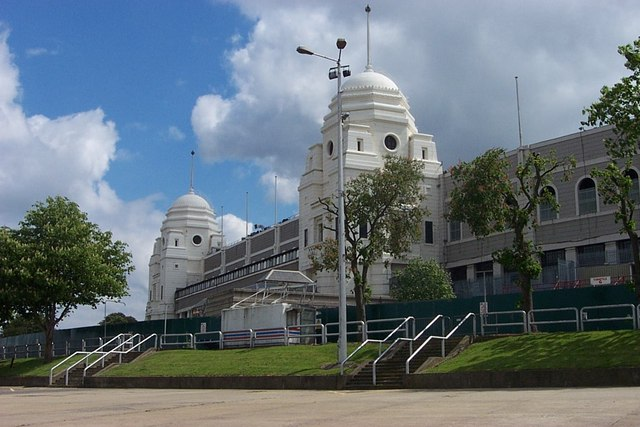
Dire Straits performed at Live Aid at the old Wembley Stadium (exterior pictured) on 13 July 1985, in between 13 dates at the nearby Wembley Arena.

Additionally, in 1985, a group that set out from London to Khartoum to raise money for famine relief, led by John Abbey, was called "The Walk of Life". Dire Straits donated the Brothers in Arms Gold disc to the participants in recognition of what they were doing.

The band's concert of 10 July 1985 at Wembley Arena, in which they were accompanied by Nils Lofgren for "Solid Rock" and Hank Marvin joined the band at the end to play "Going Home" (the theme from Local Hero), was partially televised in the United Kingdom on The Tube on Channel 4 in January 1986. (Although never officially released, bootleg recordings of the performance entitled Wembley does the Walk (2005) have been circulated.)

In 1986, Brothers in Arms won two Grammy Awards and also won Best British Album at the 1987 Brit Awards. Q magazine placed the album at number 51 in its list of the 100 Greatest British Albums Ever in 2000. The album also ranked number 351 on Rolling Stone magazine's list of the "500 Greatest Albums of All Time" in 2003. Brothers in Arms is also ranked number 3 in the best albums of 1985 and number 31 in the best albums of the 1980s, and as of December 2017, the album was ranked the eighth-best-selling album in UK chart history, and is the 107th-best-selling album in the United States. In August 1986, MTV Europe was launched with Dire Straits' "Money for Nothing".

=== 1987–1990: Hiatus and first break-up ===
After the Brothers in Arms tour, Mark Knopfler took a break from Dire Straits, and, during 1987, he concentrated on solo projects and film soundtracks. Dire Straits regrouped in 1988 for the Nelson Mandela 70th Birthday Tribute concert, staged on 11 June 1988 at Wembley Stadium, in which they were the headline act. Guitarist Jack Sonni was unable to attend as it coincided with the birth of his twin daughters. In his place Eric Clapton played rhythm guitar with the band and during the set Clapton performed his hit "Wonderful Tonight" with them. This also concluded Sonni’s and Terry Williams’ time as members of Dire Straits.

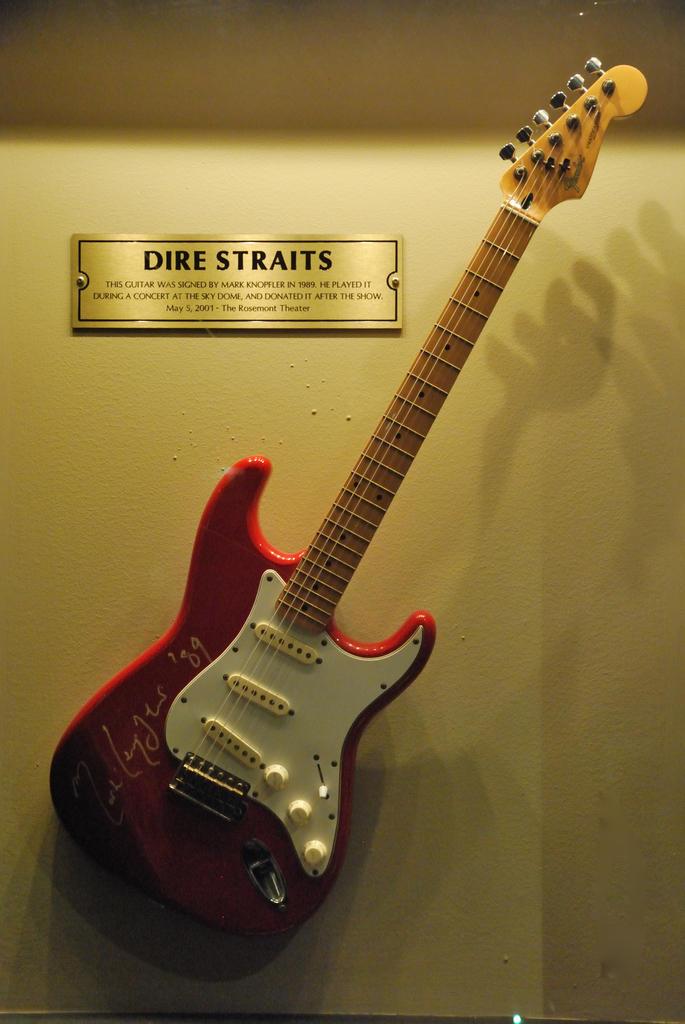
A 1989 signed Knopfler guitar at the Blues bar in Chicago

Mark Knopfler announced the dissolution of Dire Straits in September 1988. He told Rob Tannenbaum in Rolling Stone: "A lot of press reports were saying we were the biggest band in the world. There's not an accent then on the music, there's an accent on popularity. I needed a rest." The tremendous success of the Brothers in Arms album and its tour left the band members under significant stress, and Knopfler announced that he wanted to work on more personal projects. A greatest-hits compilation, Money for Nothing, was released in October 1988 and reached number one in the UK. The group's first hit single "Sultans of Swing" was re-released as a single in the UK to promote the album. Also in 1988, John Illsley released his second solo album, Glass, which featured Mark Knopfler, Alan Clark, Guy Fletcher and Chris White. During this period, Alan Clark joined Eric Clapton's band for three years, during which time Knopfler also briefly joined.

Dire Straits reunited for a one-off charity concert on 9 October 1989 at the Mayfair Ballroom in Newcastle in honour of Joanne Gillespie, the National Children of Courage and North East Personality award winner, who was then 11 years of age and published the 1989 book Brave Heart about her fight against cancer. The concert raised more than £35,000, and was also the last time Terry Williams played with Dire Straits as drummer. Brendan Croker played rhythm guitar in place of Jack Sonni.

Also in 1989 over a meal at a Notting Hill wine bar, Knopfler formed the Notting Hillbillies, a country band featuring Guy Fletcher, Brendan Croker, and Steve Phillips, and their manager, Ed Bicknell, on drums. The Notting Hillbillies' one album, Missing...Presumed Having a Good Time, with its single "Your Own Sweet Way", was released in March 1990. The Notting Hillbillies toured for the remainder of the year and appeared on Saturday Night Live. Knopfler further emphasised his country-music influences on his 1990 collaboration with the guitarist Chet Atkins, Neck and Neck.

In 1990, Dire Straits (Knopfler, Illsley, Clark and Fletcher) performed alongside Eric Clapton and his band at the Knebworth Festival, playing "Solid Rock", "Money for Nothing" and "I Think I Love You Too Much". Knopfler explained that the last was an experimental song and was unsure if they should record it on a following record. The song, a blues rock track with solos by Knopfler and Clapton, also appeared on the 1990 album Hell To Pay as a gift to Canadian blues/jazz artist Jeff Healey from Knopfler. This was prior to the time that Knopfler, Illsley and manager Ed Bicknell decided to re-form the band the following year.

=== 1990–1995: On Every Street and final dissolution ===
In 1990, Dire Straits reunited. Retaining Bicknell as their manager, Mark Knopfler, John Illsley, Alan Clark and Guy Fletcher were joined in the studio by saxophonist Chris White, steel guitarist Paul Franklin, percussionist Danny Cummings and guitarist Phil Palmer, with drums split between Jeff Porcaro of Toto and Manu Katché. The new album was produced by Knopfler, Clark and Fletcher.

Dire Straits released their sixth studio album, On Every Street, in September 1991, which turned out to be their final studio release. It was met with more moderate success and mixed reviews, as well as a significantly reduced audience. Some retrospective reviewers, including the AllMusic Guide, dubbed On Every Street an "underwhelming" follow-up to Brothers in Arms. However, it had sold 15 million copies by 2008, and on release, it went straight to number 1 in the UK Albums Chart. The album also reached number 1 in numerous European countries and Australia, and was particularly successful in France, where it achieved Diamond certification. In the US, it peaked at number 12.

Several singles were released from the album, some of which achieved success in Europe, Australasia and the US; however, none were successful in the UK. An edited version of the opening track "Calling Elvis" was the first single released from the album. With a video based on the 1960s television show Thunderbirds, the track charted at number 21 on its first week in the UK Singles Chart but dropped out of the charts within four weeks. The track fared much better elsewhere, however, reaching the top 10 in Australia, New Zealand and throughout Europe, peaking as high as the number 2 position in several countries, including Denmark and Switzerland, and number 1 in Italy.

The follow-up single, "Heavy Fuel", failed to reach the Top 50 in the UK Singles chart; however, it reached number one in the US on the Billboard Mainstream Rock Tracks chart, their second song to do so (after "Money for Nothing"). The track reached the top 20 in Canada and Belgium and peaked inside the top 30 in other European countries, as well as Australia. The album's title track was also relatively unsuccessful in the UK, failing to reach the top 40, although it reached the top 25 in France. The final single released in the UK was "The Bug", which reached the top 25 in Canada and contains backing vocals by Vince Gill, who was invited to join the band full-time but declined and pursued a solo career. "You and Your Friend" was also released as a single in France and Germany, but not in the UK.

Dire Straits, with Chris Whitten on drums, embarked on a world tour to promote the album, which lasted until October 1992. The On Every Street Tour featured 300 shows in front of some 7.1 million ticket-buying fans. While musically more elaborate than the previous 1985–86 world tour, the band's gruelling final tour was not as critically acclaimed nor as commercially successful. This proved to be too much for Dire Straits, and by this time Mark Knopfler had enough of such massive operations. This led to the second and final break-up. Bill Flanagan described the sequence of events in GQ: "The subsequent world tour lasted nearly two years, made mountains of money and drove Dire Straits into the ground. When the tour was over, both Knopfler's marriage and his band were gone."

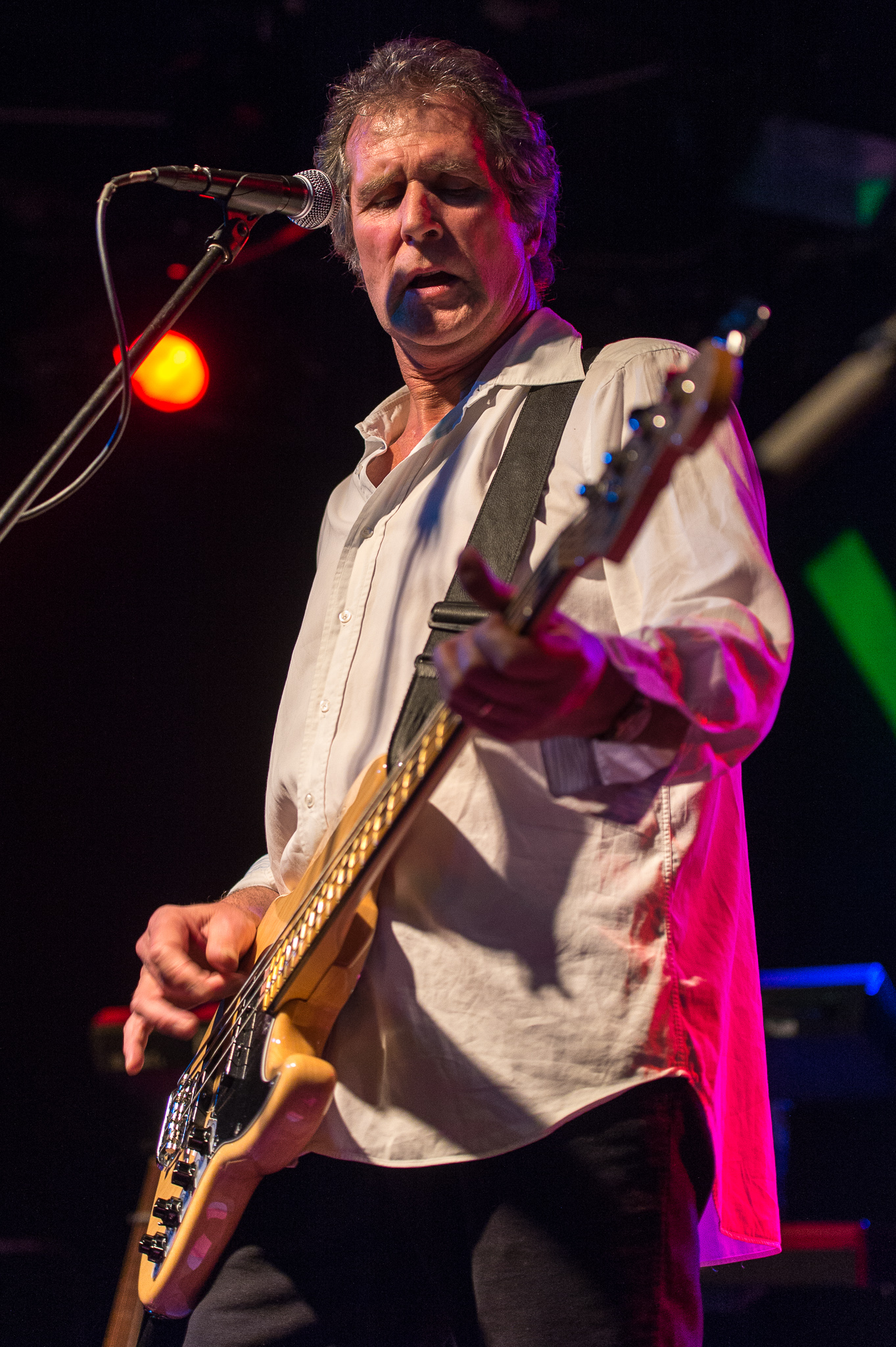
Following their On Every Street Tour, John Illsley stated, "Personal relationships were in trouble and it put a terrible strain on everybody, emotionally and physically. We were changed by it. Neither of us wants to go back to those days."

Manager Ed Bicknell also said, "The last tour was utter misery. Whatever the zeitgeist was that we had been part of, it had passed." John Illsley agreed, saying "Personal relationships were in trouble and it put a terrible strain on everybody, emotionally and physically. We were changed by it." The last stop and final touring concert of the group took place on 9 October 1992 in Zaragoza, Aragon, Spain.

After the tour, Mark Knopfler expressed a wish to give up touring on a big scale and took some time out from the music business. A live album, On the Night, was released in May 1993, which documented the tour, again to very mixed reviews. Nevertheless, it reached the UK Top 5, a rare achievement for a live album. The four-track Encores EP was also released and rose to number one in the French and Spanish singles charts and reached number 31 in the UK.

Dire Straits' final album, Live at the BBC, is a collection of live recordings from 1978 to 1981, which mostly feature the original line-up of the band. Released in June 1995, their third and final live album was a contractual release to Vertigo Records (now a division of Mercury Records). At this time, Mark Knopfler quietly disbanded Dire Straits and prepared to work on his first fully fledged solo album (still signed to Mercury Records). Knopfler later recalled, "I put the thing to bed because I wanted to get back to some kind of reality. It's self-protection, a survival thing. That kind of scale is dehumanising." Knopfler spent two years recovering from the experience, which had taken a toll on his creative and personal life.

=== 1996–present: Reunion speculations and Rock and Roll Hall of Fame induction ===
After disbanding Dire Straits, Mark Knopfler started a career as a solo artist, releasing his first solo album, Golden Heart, in March 1996 after nearly 20 years of collaborations. Brothers in Arms was certified nine times platinum in the US in August 1996. During that year, the entire Dire Straits catalogue was remastered by Bob Ludwig and re-released on CD on Mercury Records, in most of the world outside the US. The remasters were released in September 2000 in the US on Warner Bros.

Knopfler, John Illsley, Alan Clark, and Guy Fletcher reunited one last time on 19 June 1999, with Ed Bicknell on drums, playing five songs, including Chuck Berry's "Nadine", for Illsley's wedding. In July 2002, Knopfler was joined by Illsley, Fletcher, Danny Cummings and Chris White for four charity concerts under the name of "Mark Knopfler and friends". Brendan Croker joined Knopfler during the first half, playing mainly material composed with The Notting Hillbillies. Illsley came on for a Dire Straits session toward the end of which, at a Shepherd's Bush concert, Jimmy Nail provided backing vocals for Knopfler's solo composition "Why Aye Man". This song appeared on The Ragpicker's Dream (2002), an album that contained references to Knopfler's home area in the northeast of England.

A compilation album, The Best of Dire Straits & Mark Knopfler: Private Investigations, was released in November 2005 and reached the UK Top 20. Featuring material from the majority of Dire Straits' studio albums and Knopfler's solo and soundtrack material, it was released in two editions, a single CD with a grey cover and a double CD in a blue cover. The only previously unreleased track on the album, "All the Roadrunning", was a duet with singer Emmylou Harris. The album was well received. In 2005, Brothers in Arms was re-released in a limited 20th-anniversary edition which won a Grammy Award for Best Surround Sound Album at the 48th Grammy Awards ceremony.

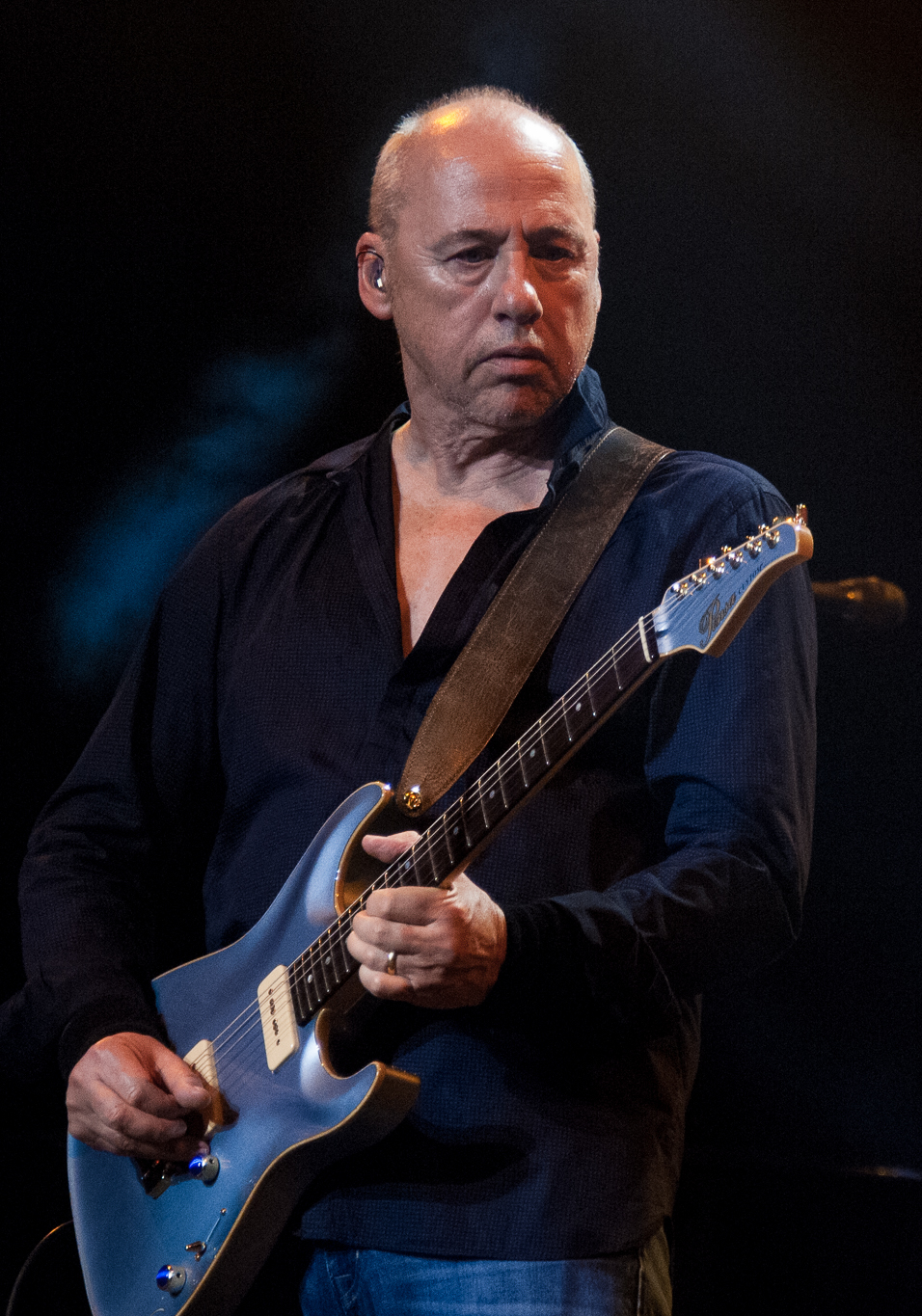
Mark Knopfler, pictured in 2015, has declined offers to re-form the band, stating "It just got too big. If anyone can tell me one good thing about fame, I'd be very interested to hear it."

Since the break-up of Dire Straits, Knopfler has shown no interest in re-forming the band and said he was not interested in "getting all that stuff back together again." He said, "I would only do that for a charity. I'm glad I've experienced it all – I had a lot of fun with it – but I like things the way they are." Keyboardist Guy Fletcher has been associated with almost all of Knopfler's solo work to date and Danny Cummings has been a frequent contributor, notably to Knopfler's solo album releases All the Roadrunning (with Emmylou Harris), Kill to Get Crimson, Get Lucky and One Deep River.

In 2007, Knopfler said he did not miss the global fame that came his way at the height of the band's success. He said, "It just got too big." In October 2008, Illsley told the BBC that he hoped Knopfler would agree to re-form Dire Straits for a comeback tour. Knopfler declined, saying that he was reluctant to re-form the group and that he was not "a fan of Dire Straits' early hits." In the same interview, Illsley said Knopfler was enjoying his continuing success as a solo artist. "He's doing incredibly well as a solo artist, so hats off to him. He's having a perfectly good time doing what he's doing." Guy Fletcher stated on his website that Knopfler had no interest in re-forming Dire Straits.

In December 2009, the band were commemorated with a Heritage Award from PRS for Music. A plaque was placed on a block of flats in Deptford, London, where Dire Straits was formed and played their first gig. In 2011, Alan Clark, Chris White, and Phil Palmer, along with Tom Petty and the Heartbreakers' drummer Steve Ferrone, formed a new band, the Straits, to perform at a charity show at the Royal Albert Hall in London.

On 13 December 2017, Dire Straits were announced as inductees into the Rock and Roll Hall of Fame for 2018. Speaking to Billboard magazine, John Illsley said he was pleased to have his work as a musician recognised, but felt that Knopfler was not enthusiastic about a possible reunion performance. Knopfler did not appear at the ceremony; John Illsley, Alan Clark and Guy Fletcher were the only band members who attended. According to Illsley, Knopfler "just didn't feel like coming, it's as simple as that. It just didn't appeal to him, and I appealed to him on several occasions." Dire Straits were the first act ever inducted without anyone introducing them, and they did not perform.

In 2009, Illsley and Clark performed several Dire Straits songs in an open air concert in San Vigilio, and since then, Clark, Palmer, Illsley, Cummings, Collins, Sonni and Withers, in various line-ups, have toured as the Dire Straits Legends and continue as the Dire Straits Legacy. They have released an album, 3 Chord Trick. In a 2018 US tour they were joined by Trevor Horn on bass and Steve Ferrone on drums.

In September 2021, Alan Clark released his piano solo album Backstory, and in November 2021 Illsley published his autobiography My Life in Dire Straits. Former Straits guitarist Jack Sonni died on 30 August 2023 at the age of 68.

In November 2023, John Illsley reiterated in an interview that he and Knopfler had no interest in re-forming Dire Straits, in spite of having received large financial offers to re-form. He reflected that the band members had "reached the end of the road" after their final world tour ended in October 1992, and that he was "pretty happy" when the band's run came to an end, recalling feeling "mentally, physically and emotionally exhausted" by the time Dire Straits disbanded. He said he and Knopfler had enjoyed the success of the band, despite the stress of keeping it working, and quoted Knopfler's comment that "success is great, but fame is [...] something you don't really want". Knopfler said: "I had an absolute ball for as long as it lasted, until it got so big that I didn't know the names of all the roadies [...] It got so big, we were actually leapfrogging stages [running duplicate convoys of equipment]."

== Musical style and influences ==
Dire Straits' sound is derived from "the laid-back blues-rock" that American musician JJ Cale was known for. Their style is characterized by Mark Knopfler's fingerstyle guitar technique. American online music database AllMusic describes the band's sound as "minimalistic and stripped down". The site wrote: "If anything, the band was a direct outgrowth of the roots revivalism of pub rock, but where pub rock celebrated good times, Dire Straits were melancholy." Louder wrote that when the band released their self-titled debut album, "Dire Straits became a byword for a certain sort of safe, homogenised music, and Knopfler was turned into a caricature of the middle-aged rocker, with jacket sleeves rolled up and wearing a headband." The band's later output is considered to be more mature and "refined", according to AllMusic. Their sound also drew influence from jazz and country music, and would occasionally flirt with progressive rock with their use of unorthodox song structures. Frontman Mark Knopfler's lyricisms employed stream of conscious and narrative styles, which drew comparisons to Bob Dylan. The Rock and Roll Hall of Fame states that his lyrics are introspective.

== Legacy ==
Dire Straits are one of the most popular British rock bands and one of the world's most commercially successful artists, with more than 120 million albums sold worldwide. The Rock and Roll Hall of Fame stated that the band "were one of the few rock bands to break out in an era dominated by punk and disco", and that "introspective lyrics with out-of-this-world guitar and drum sounds made them one of the most original rock bands of the 80s."

== Band members ==
Final members

- Mark Knopfler – lead vocals, lead and rhythm guitars (1977–1988, 1990–1995)
- John Illsley – bass, backing vocals (1977–1988, 1990–1995)
- Alan Clark – keyboards (1980–1988, 1990–1995)
- Guy Fletcher – keyboards, backing vocals (1984–1988, 1990–1995)

Former members

- Pick Withers – drums, occasional backing vocals (1977–1982)
- David Knopfler – rhythm guitar, backing vocals (1977–1980)
- Hal Lindes – rhythm guitar, backing vocals (1980–1984)
- Terry Williams – drums (1982–1988)
- Jack Sonni – rhythm guitar, backing vocals (1984–1988; died 2023)

== Discography ==
- Dire Straits (1978)
- Communiqué (1979)
- Making Movies (1980)
- Love over Gold (1982)
- Brothers in Arms (1985)
- On Every Street (1991)

== Awards ==
=== Honoured and inducted ===
- PRS for Music Heritage Award 2009
- Rock and Roll Hall of Fame 2018

=== Won ===
- Brit Awards 1983 – British Group
- Brit Awards 1986 – British Group
- Grammy Award 1986 – Best Rock Performance by a Duo Or Group (for "Money for Nothing")
- Grammy Award 1986 – Best Engineered Recording, Non-Classical (for Brothers in Arms, Mark Knopfler, Neil Dorfsman, engineer)
- Juno Award 1986 – International Album of the Year
- MTV Video Music Award 1986 – Video of the Year (for "Money for Nothing")
- MTV Video Music Award 1986 – Best Group Video (for "Money for Nothing")
- Brit Awards 1987 – British Album of the Year (for Brothers in Arms)
- Grammy Award 1987 – Best Music Video (for "Brothers in Arms")
- Grammy Award 2006 – Best Surround Sound Album (for his surround sound production for Brothers in Arms—20th Anniversary Edition, Chuck Ainlay, surround mix engineer; Bob Ludwig, surround mastering engineer; Chuck Ainlay and Mark Knopfler, surround producers)

=== Nominated ===
- Grammy Award 1980 – Best New Artist
- Grammy Award 1980 – Best Rock Vocal Performance by a Duo or Group (for "Sultans of Swing")
- American Music Award 1986 – Favorite Pop/Rock Single (for "Money for Nothing")
- Brit Awards 1986 – British Album of the Year (for Brothers in Arms)
- Brit Awards 1986 – British Single (for "Money for Nothing")
- Brit Awards 1986 – British Video (for "Money for Nothing")
- Grammy Award 1986 – Album of the Year (for Brothers in Arms)
- Grammy Award 1986 – Record of the Year (for "Money for Nothing")
- Grammy Award 1986 – Song of the Year (for "Money for Nothing")
- MTV Video Music Award 1986 – Best Concept Video (for "Money for Nothing")
- MTV Video Music Award 1986 – Most Experimental Video (for "Money for Nothing")
- MTV Video Music Award 1986 – Best Stage Performance in a Video (for "Money for Nothing")
- MTV Video Music Award 1986 – Best Overall Performance in a Video (for "Money for Nothing")
- MTV Video Music Award 1986 – Best Direction in a Video (for "Money for Nothing")
- MTV Video Music Award 1986 – Best Visual Effects in a Video (for "Money for Nothing")
- MTV Video Music Award 1986 – Best Art Direction in a Video (for "Money for Nothing")
- MTV Video Music Award 1986 – Best Editing in a Video (for "Money for Nothing")
- MTV Video Music Award 1986 – Viewer's Choice (for "Money for Nothing")
- Brit Awards 1987 – British Group
- Brit Awards 1992 – British Group
- Grammy Award 1992 – Best Music Video (for "Calling Elvis")
- Brit Awards 2010 – British Album of 30 Years (for Brothers in Arms)

== See also ==
- "Between dire straits": The Three Weeks
