= Private Investigations (song) =

Single by Dire Straits

from the album Love over Gold
- B-side: "Badges, Posters, Stickers, T-Shirts"
- Released: 27 August 1982
- Recorded: 8 March – 11 June 1982
- Genre: Progressive rock
- Length: 6:45 (Album version); 5:51 (Single edit)
- Label: Vertigo
- Songwriter: Mark Knopfler
- Producer: Mark Knopfler

Dire Straits singles chronology
"Romeo and Juliet" (1981)	"Private Investigations" (1982)	"Industrial Disease" (1982)

"Private Investigations" is a song by the British rock band Dire Straits from their album Love over Gold. It reached number 2 in the United Kingdom and is one of their biggest chart successes in the UK. The track has appeared on the compilation albums Money for Nothing and Sultans of Swing: The Very Best of Dire Straits, and is the title track to the more recent 2005 compilation, Private Investigations: The Best of Dire Straits & Mark Knopfler.

The song begins with a deep-pitched synthesizer orchestration (omitted from the 7" single edit), leading into a slow piano progression accompanying a classical guitar, followed by several spoken verses. The single edit removes the opening synthesisers, beginning with acoustic guitar.

After the verses, the song opens into a slow, bass-driven beat, with strident electric guitar chords at the end, before the gradual diminuendo featuring extended interplay between Mark Knopfler's acoustic guitar and marimba played by Mike Mainieri.

On the Sultans of Swing: The Very Best of Dire Straits DVD, Mark Knopfler said this about the song: "It's just about the Private Investigations... "What have you got at the end of the day" – Nothing more than you started out with..." It is said the song was inspired by author Raymond Chandler. Parts of the song were first played live in 1981 as a coda to the song "News".

This song was also modified by Mark Knopfler into a score for the Bill Forsyth film Comfort and Joy in 1984, in which portions of the song are used for certain scenes.

It was also used in the video release of the 1984 film Against All Odds during the deleted scenes. A section of the footage cut from the final release dealt with the time spent on the run, in Mexico, by Rachel Ward’s & Jeff Bridges' characters.

The riff from the song was used in France on a Crédit Agricole advert in 1984, and on a BT advert in 1994.

== Charts ==
=== Weekly charts ===
Chart (1982)	Peak position
Australia (Kent Music Report)	21
Austria (Ö3 Austria Top 40)	19
Belgium (Ultratop 50 Flanders)	1
Finland (Suomen virallinen lista)	20
France (IFOP)	4
Ireland (IRMA)	2
Netherlands (Dutch Top 40)	1
Netherlands (Single Top 100)	1
New Zealand (Recorded Music NZ)	16
Switzerland (Schweizer Hitparade)	4
UK Singles (Official Charts)	2

=== Year-end charts ===
Chart (1982)	Position
Belgium (Ultratop Flanders)	25
Netherlands (Dutch Top 40)	6
Netherlands (Single Top 100)	10

== Certifications ==
Region	Certification	Certified units/sales
New Zealand (RMNZ)	Gold	15,000^{‡}
United Kingdom (BPI)	Silver	250,000^{^}
^{^} Shipments figures based on certification alone.^{‡} Sales+streaming figures based on certification alone.
