= On Every Street (song) =

1992 single by Dire Straits

Single by Dire Straits

from the album On Every Street
- B-side: "Romeo and Juliet"
- Released: 10 February 1992
- Length: 5:04
- Label: Vertigo
- Songwriter(s): Mark Knopfler
- Producer(s): Mark Knopfler

Dire Straits singles chronology
"Heavy Fuel" (1991)	"On Every Street" (1992)	"The Bug" (1992)

"On Every Street" is the third single and title track from the album of the same name by English rock band Dire Straits. No promotional video was made for the song. Its B-side is a track from the band's 1980 album Making Movies, "Romeo and Juliet". The song was also included on the 2005 compilation The Best of Dire Straits & Mark Knopfler: Private Investigations.

== Track listing ==
7-inch single

1. "On Every Street"
2. "Romeo and Juliet"

== Charts ==
Chart (1992)	Peak position
Australia (ARIA)	109
France (SNEP)	23
Netherlands (Single Top 100)	42
UK Singles (OCC)	42

== Release history ==
Region	Date	Format(s)	Label(s)	Ref.
Australia	10 February 1992	CD; cassette	Vertigo	
United Kingdom	17 February 1992	7-inch vinyl; CD; cassette	Vertigo	
