= Heavy Fuel =

1991 single by Dire Straits

Single by Dire Straits

from the album On Every Street
- B-side: "Planet of New Orleans"; "Kingdom Come"
- Released: 21 October 1991
- Genre: Rock
- Length: 4:57 (album version); 4:03 (single version)
- Label: Vertigo
- Songwriter: Mark Knopfler
- Producers: Mark Knopfler; Alan Clark

Dire Straits singles chronology
"Calling Elvis" (1991)	"Heavy Fuel" (1991)	"On Every Street" (1992)

Music video
- "Heavy Fuel" on YouTube

"Heavy Fuel" is a song by British rock band Dire Straits, released in October 1991 by Vertigo Records as the second single from their sixth and final album, On Every Street (1991). The song reached No. 1 on the US Billboard Album Rock Tracks chart, making it the band's second song to do so.

== Lyrical content ==
In "Heavy Fuel", Mark Knopfler ironically extols the virtues of such vices as cigarettes, hamburgers, Scotch, lust, money and violence. The phrase "You got to run on heavy fuel" is from the novel Money by Martin Amis, on which Knopfler based his lyric.

== Music video ==
The song's music video features American actor-comedian Randy Quaid who plays as the band's roadie messing around the venues where the band performs and even fantasizes himself as the band's singer Mark Knopfler.

== Track listings ==
1. "Heavy Fuel"
2. "Planet of New Orleans"
3. "Kingdom Come"

== Charts ==
=== Weekly charts ===
Weekly chart performance for "Heavy Fuel"
Chart (1990–1992)	Peak position
Australia (ARIA)	26
Belgium (Ultratop 50 Flanders)	19
Canada Top Singles (RPM)	17
Europe (European Hit Radio)	13
France (SNEP)	32
Germany (GfK)	48
Luxembourg (Radio Luxembourg)	10
Netherlands (Dutch Top 40)	24
Netherlands (Single Top 100)	25
New Zealand (Recorded Music NZ)	34
UK Singles (Official Charts)	55
UK Airplay (Music Week)	9
US Alternative Airplay (Billboard)	22
US Mainstream Rock (Billboard)	1

=== Year-end charts ===
Annual chart rankings for "Heavy Fuel"
Chart (1991)	Position
Italy (Musica e dischi)	100

Chart (1992)	Position
US Album Rock Tracks (Billboard)	15

== Release history ==
Region	Date	Format(s)	Label(s)	Ref.
United Kingdom	21 October 1991	7-inch vinyl; 12-inch vinyl; CD; cassette	Vertigo	
Australia	4 November 1991	CD; cassette	Vertigo	
Japan	5 December 1991	Mini-CD	Vertigo	

== See also ==
- List of Billboard Mainstream Rock number-one songs of the 1990s
