= Chris White (saxophonist) =

English saxophonist

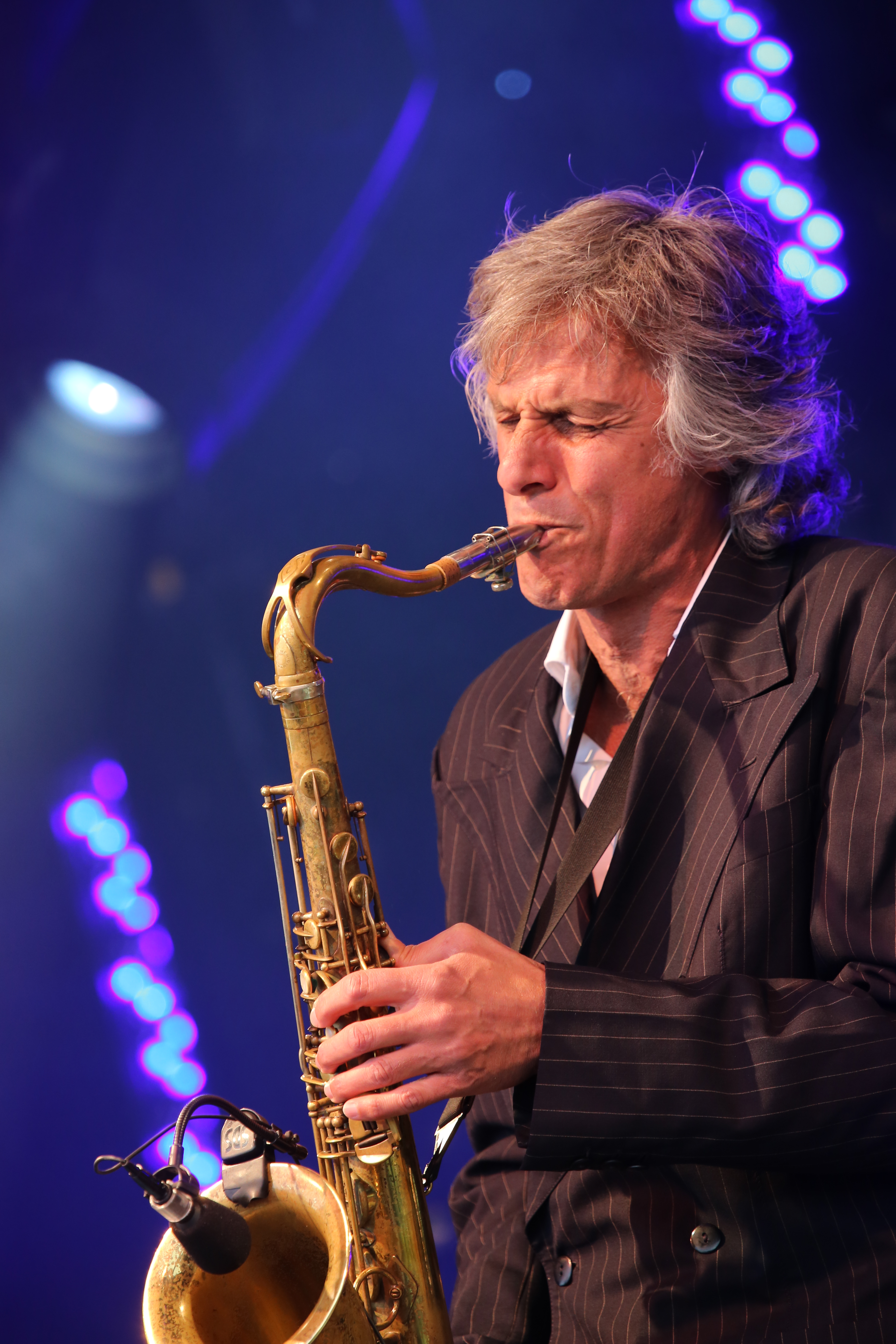
- White performing with The Straits at Concert at the Kings in 2014

Background information
- Born: 13 July 1955 (age 71); Bristol, England
- Genres: Rock, celtic rock, country, blues
- Occupations: Musician, composer
- Instruments: Saxophone, flute, tambourine
- Labels: Vertigo, Mercury

Chris White (born 13 July 1955) is an English jazz/rock saxophonist who toured with Dire Straits from 1985 to 1995, and who has played with many bands and artists, including Robbie Williams, Paul McCartney, Chris De Burgh and Mick Jagger.

== Biography ==
White took up the saxophone at the age of 13, whilst a pupil at Lawrence Weston Secondary School. He started gigging a couple of years later, and was soon playing in the National Youth Jazz Orchestra and touring with other musicians (such as France Gall). He joined Dire Straits in 1985 (saxophones, flute, backing vocals and percussion) for their two final world tours, Brothers in Arms (1985–1986) and On Every Street (1991–1992), and played at both the Live Aid concert in 1985 and the Nelson Mandela's 70th Birthday Concert in 1988. He played on the sixth Dire Straits studio album On Every Street, released in September 1991, and on the band's second live album On the Night, released in 1993, which was recorded during the On Every Street tour at tour concerts in Nîmes, France and Rotterdam, The Netherlands.

In May 1990, he joined The Notting Hillbillies, a country rock project formed by Mark Knopfler.

In 1991, White released his first and only solo album, Shadowdance comprising Jazz-Rock, Fusion and Contemporary Jazz. A motorcycle accident in 1993 prevented him from touring with Pink Floyd.

In July 2002, he joined Knopfler, Illsley, Fletcher, Danny Cummings for four charity concerts under the name of "Mark Knopfler and friends".

In 2007, White played with Tom Jones and Bryan Ferry at the Concert for Diana at Wembley Stadium.

He was a member of The Straits, a former Dire Straits cover band and tribute band where "former members of Dire Straits perform the band's greatest hits", its members being Alan Clark, Chris White, Terence Reis, Steve Ferrone, Mickey Feat, Adam Philips and Jamie Squire. The Dire Straits Legacy also planned, as of 2017, on releasing original material. He, along with the other members of tribute act and cover band The Dire Straits Experience also performed at a charity event in Gurgaon and Bangalore, India in March 2017.

As of 2022, 2023 and 2024, White continues to perform and tour with The Dire Straits Experience band.

== Discography ==
=== Discography ===
- Shadowdance, 1991.

=== Dire Straits ===
- On Every Street, 1991.
- On the Night, 1993.
- Encores, 1993.
- San Antonio Live in 85, 2025.
