= The Bug =

1992 single by Dire Straits

Single by Dire Straits

from the album On Every Street
- B-side: "Twisting by the Pool"; "Expresso Love"; "Walk of Life"
- Released: 15 June 1992
- Genre: Rockabilly
- Length: 4:16
- Label: Vertigo
- Songwriter: Mark Knopfler
- Producer: Mark Knopfler

Dire Straits singles chronology
"On Every Street" (1992)	"The Bug" (1992)	"You and Your Friend" (1992)

"The Bug" is a song written by Mark Knopfler and originally recorded by Dire Straits on the final studio album by the band, On Every Street (1991). It was covered by Mary Chapin Carpenter in 1992, and also recorded on the albums Blues Ballads (1996) by The Alex Bollard Assembly and Keep Your Hands to Yourself (2002) by Mike Berry & The Outlaws.

== Dire Straits ==
The song is the fourth and final UK single from the album On Every Street by English rock band Dire Straits, where it reached number 67, and it also was to be Dire Straits' final single release in the UK. The song reached number 21 in Canada. Other songs from the album were released as singles in selected countries ("You and Your Friend" in France and Germany or "Ticket to Heaven" in Netherlands).

=== Track listings ===
- 7-inch vinyl single
1. "The Bug"
2. "Twisting by the Pool"
- 5-inch CD single
1. "The Bug"
2. "Twisting by the Pool"
3. "Expresso Love"
4. "Walk of Life"

=== Charts ===
Chart (1992)	Peak position
Canada Top Singles (RPM)	21
UK Singles (OCC)	67
UK Airplay (Music Week)	46

== Release history ==
Region	Date	Format(s)	Label(s)	Ref.
United Kingdom	15 June 1992	7-inch vinyl; 12-inch vinyl; CD; cassette	Vertigo	
Australia	13 July 1992	CD; cassette	Vertigo	

== Mary Chapin Carpenter version ==
"The Bug"

Single by Mary Chapin Carpenter

from the album Come On Come On
- B-side: "Rhythm of the Blues"
- Released: 1993
- Studio: Bias
- Genre: Country
- Length: 3:47
- Label: Columbia
- Songwriter: Mark Knopfler
- Producers: John Jennings, Mary Chapin Carpenter, Steve Buckingham

Mary Chapin Carpenter singles chronology
"The Hard Way" (1993)	"The Bug" (1993)	"He Thinks He'll Keep Her" (1993)

The song was covered by Mary Chapin Carpenter on her 1992 album Come On Come On, and was released as a single the next year, peaking at 16 on Billboard's Hot Country Singles & Tracks. This version of the song is also included on the soundtrack of the 2006 animated film Everyone's Hero.

=== Charts ===
Chart (1993)	Peak position
Canada Country Singles (RPM)	22
US Hot Country Songs (Billboard)	16
