= Dire Straits discography =

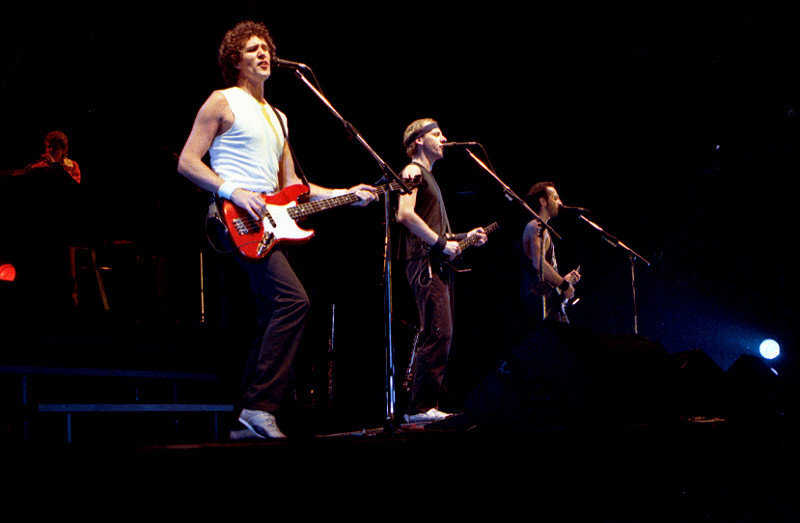
- Dire Straits performing live in Norway, October 1985
- Studio albums: 6
- Extended plays: 3
- Live albums: 5
- Compilation albums: 3
- Singles: 31
- Music videos: 15
- Box sets: 2

The discography of the British rock band Dire Straits consists of six studio albums, five live albums, three compilation albums, four extended plays, 31 singles and 15 music videos. Dire Straits also have sold over 100 million records worldwide, making them one of the best-selling music artists in the world.

== Albums ==
=== Studio albums ===
Title	Album details	Peak chart positions										Certifications
Title	Album details	UK	AUS	AUT	CAN	FRA	GER	NLD	NZ	SWI	US	Certifications
Dire Straits	Released: 9 June 1978; Label: Vertigo	5	1	17	2	1	3	3	2	7	2	BPI: 2× Platinum; BVMI: Platinum; IFPI SWI: 2× Platinum; MC: 4× Platinum; NVPI: Platinum; RIAA: 2× Platinum; RMNZ: Platinum; SNEP: Platinum
Communiqué	Released: 5 June 1979; Label: Vertigo	5	5	7	14	3	1	3	1	2	11	BPI: Platinum; BVMI: Platinum; IFPI SWI: 3× Platinum; MC: 2× Platinum; NVPI: Platinum; RIAA: Gold; RMNZ: Gold; SNEP: 2× Platinum
Making Movies	Released: 17 October 1980; Label: Vertigo	4	6	15	21	6	7	6	3	—	19	BPI: 2× Platinum; BVMI: Gold; IFPI SWI: Gold; MC: 2× Platinum; NVPI: Gold; RIAA: Platinum; RMNZ: Platinum; SNEP: Gold
Love over Gold	Released: 24 September 1982; Label: Vertigo	1	1	1	6	2	4	1	1	—	19	BPI: 2× Platinum; ARIA: 2× Platinum; BVMI: Platinum; MC: 2× Platinum; NVPI: Platinum; RIAA: Gold; RMNZ: Platinum; SNEP: Platinum
Brothers in Arms	Released: 17 May 1985; Label: Vertigo	1	1	1	1	1	1	1	1	1	1	BPI: 14× Platinum; ARIA: 17× Platinum; BVMI: Platinum; IFPI AUT: 4× Platinum; IFPI SWI: Diamond; MC: Diamond; RIAA: 9× Platinum; RMNZ: Platinum; SNEP: Diamond
On Every Street	Released: 9 September 1991; Label: Vertigo	1	1	1	3	1	1	1	1	1	12	BPI: 2× Platinum; ARIA: 2× Platinum; BVMI: Platinum; IFPI AUT: Platinum; IFPI SWI: 4× Platinum; MC: 2× Platinum; NVPI: Platinum; RIAA: Platinum; RMNZ: Platinum; SNEP: Diamond
"—" denotes items that did not chart or were not released in that territory.

=== Live albums ===
Title	Album details	Peak chart positions										Certifications
Title	Album details	UK	AUS	AUT	CAN	FRA	GER	NLD	NZ	SWI	US	Certifications
Alchemy: Dire Straits Live	Released: 16 March 1984; Label: Vertigo	3	3	9	26	4	8	1	3	3	46	BPI: Platinum; ARIA: Gold; BVMI: Gold; MC: Gold; NVPI: Platinum; RIAA: Gold; RMNZ: Platinum; SNEP: Gold
On the Night	Released: 10 May 1993; Label: Vertigo	4	5	1	33	1	7	2	10	5	116	BPI: Gold; ARIA: Gold; IFPI AUT: Gold; IFPI SWI: Gold; NVPI: Platinum; RMNZ: Gold; SNEP: Platinum
Live at the BBC	Released: 26 June 1995; Label: Windsong	71	98	—	—	13	—	15	—	45	—	

=== Various artists live albums ===
Title	Album details
Live at Knebworth	Includes two Dire Straits tracks; Released: 1990; Label: Vertigo

=== Compilation albums ===
Title	Album details	Peak chart positions										Certifications
Title	Album details	UK	AUS	AUT	CAN	FRA	GER	NLD	NZ	SWI	US	Certifications
Money for Nothing	Released: 17 October 1988; Label: Vertigo	1	3	3	—	1	2	4	2	1	62	BPI: 4× Platinum; ARIA: 3× Platinum; BVMI: Platinum; IFPI SWI: 3× Platinum; MC: Platinum; NVPI: Platinum; RIAA: Platinum; RMNZ: Platinum; SNEP: Diamond
Sultans of Swing: The Very Best of Dire Straits	Released: 19 October 1998; Label: Vertigo	6	4	5	60	1	6	6	6	3	—	BPI: 3× Platinum; ARIA: 6× Platinum; BVMI: Gold; IFPI AUT: Gold; IFPI SWI: Platinum; NVPI: Gold; RMNZ: Platinum; SNEP: Platinum
Private Investigations: The Best of Dire Straits & Mark Knopfler	Released: 7 November 2005; Label: Mercury	20	35	44	—	4	36	23	17	15	—	BPI: 5× Platinum; ARIA: Platinum; RMNZ: Platinum
"—" denotes items that did not chart or were not released in that territory.

=== Box sets ===
Title	Album details	Peak chart positions	
Title	Album details	UK	GER
The Studio Albums 1978–1991	Released: December 2013 (LP); Released: October 2020 (CD); Label: Vertigo	9	14
Live 1978–1992	Released: 3 November 2023 (LP and CD); Label: Mercury	81	7
"—" denotes items are yet to be released in that territory.

== Extended plays ==
Title	EP details	Peak chart positions									Certifications
Title	EP details	UK	AUS	AUT	CAN	FRA	GER	NLD	SWI	US	Certifications
ExtendedancEPlay	Released: 10 January 1983; Label: Vertigo	—	—	—	12	—	—	—	—	53	MC: Platinum
Encores	Released: 10 May 1993; Label: Vertigo	31	47	19	91	1	34	3	20	—	
The Honky Tonk Demos	Released: 18 April 2015; Label: Vertigo	—	—	—	—	—	—	—	—	—	
"—" denotes items that did not chart or were not released in that territory.

== Singles ==
Title	Year	Peak chart positions											Certifications	Album
Title	Year	UK	AUS	AUT	CAN	FRA	GER	NLD	NZ	SWI	US	US Main	Certifications	Album
"Sultans of Swing"	1978	8	6	—	4	36	20	11	12	—	4	—	BPI: 4× Platinum; BVMI: Platinum; MC: Gold; RMNZ: 10× Platinum	Dire Straits
"Water of Love"	1978	—	54	—	—	—	—	28	—	—	—	—	RMNZ: Gold	Dire Straits
"Lady Writer"	1979	51	95	—	51	34	—	18	39	—	45	—	BPI: Silver; RMNZ: Platinum	Communiqué
"Once Upon a Time in the West"	1979	—	—	—	—	—	—	—	—	—	—	—	RMNZ: Platinum	Communiqué
"Tunnel of Love"	1980	54	62	—	—	52	44	28	—	—	—	—	BPI: Silver; RMNZ: Platinum	Making Movies
"Skateaway"	1980	37	—	—	—	—	—	—	47	—	58	31		Making Movies
"Solid Rock" [airplay]	1980	—	—	—	—	—	—	—	—	—	—	56		Making Movies
"Expresso Love"	1980	—	—	—	—	—	—	—	—	—	—	39		Making Movies
"Romeo and Juliet"	1981	8	—	—	—	—	—	—	—	—	—	—	BPI: 2× Platinum; RMNZ: 4× Platinum	Making Movies
"Private Investigations"	1982	2	21	19	—	4	—	1	16	4	—	—	BPI: Silver; RMNZ: Gold	Love over Gold
"Industrial Disease"	1982	—	—	—	18	—	—	—	—	—	75	9		Love over Gold
"Twisting by the Pool"	1983	14	2	—	18	29	31	6	1	11	105	12		ExtendedancEPlay
"Love over Gold" (live)	1984	50	46	—	—	15	—	43	29	—	—	—		Alchemy
"So Far Away"	1985	20	22	—	24	20	—	23	25	6	19	29	BPI: Silver; RMNZ: 2× Platinum	Brothers in Arms
"Money for Nothing"	1985	4	4	7	1	34	19	35	4	22	1	1	BPI: 2× Platinum; BVMI: Gold; MC: Gold; RMNZ: 6× Platinum	Brothers in Arms
"Brothers in Arms"	1985	16	57	—	—	—	—	—	5	—	—	—	BPI: Platinum; BVMI: Gold; RMNZ: 3× Platinum	Brothers in Arms
"Walk of Life"	1985	2	11	18	7	—	15	17	3	24	7	6	BPI: 3× Platinum; RMNZ: 6× Platinum	Brothers in Arms
"One World" [airplay]	1985	—	—	—	—	—	—	—	—	—	—	8		Brothers in Arms
"Ride Across The River" [promo]	1985	—	—	—	—	—	—	—	—	—	—	21		Brothers in Arms
"Your Latest Trick"	1986	26	—	—	—	—	—	—	47	—	—	—	BPI: Silver; RMNZ: Gold	Brothers in Arms
"Why Worry"	1986	—	—	—	—	—	—	—	—	—	—	—	RMNZ: Gold	Brothers in Arms
"Sultans of Swing" (re-release)	1988	62	—	—	—	—	—	—	—	—	—	—		Money for Nothing
"Brothers in Arms" (re-release)	1988	—	—	—	—	—	—	59	—	—	—	—		Money for Nothing
"Money for Nothing" (re-release)	1989	—	—	—	—	—	—	23	—	—	—	—		Money for Nothing
"Calling Elvis"	1991	21	8	8	4	7	8	4	9	2	—	3		On Every Street
"Heavy Fuel"	1991	55	26	—	17	32	48	25	34	—	—	1		On Every Street
"On Every Street"	1992	42	109	—	—	23	—	42	—	—	—	—		On Every Street
"The Bug"	1992	67	—	—	21	44	52	24	—	—	—	8		On Every Street
"You and Your Friend"	1992	—	—	—	—	49	—	62	—	—	—	—		On Every Street
"Ticket to Heaven"	1994	—	—	—	—	—	—	43	—	—	—	—		On Every Street
"—" denotes items that did not chart or were not released in that territory.

== Other certified songs ==
Title	Year	Certifications	Album
"Six Blade Knife"	1978	RMNZ: Gold	Dire Straits
"Wild West End"	1978	RMNZ: Platinum	Dire Straits
"Down to the Waterline"	1978	RMNZ: Platinum	Dire Straits
"Telegraph Road"	1982	RMNZ: Platinum	Love over Gold

== Home video ==
Title	Video/DVD details	Peak chart positions						Certifications
Title	Video/DVD details	UK DVD	AUS DVD	BEL DVD	FIN DVD	NLD DVD	SWI DVD	Certifications
Sultans of Swing: The Very Best of Dire Straits	Released: 21 May 1999; Label: Universal Music	19	9	—	3	2	—	BPI: Gold; ARIA: 5× Platinum
On the Night	Released: 14 September 2003; Label: Universal Music	33	18	—	—	6	—	ARIA: Platinum
Alchemy: Dire Straits Live	Released: 14 May 2010; Label: Universal Music	2	1	2	7	5	6	ARIA: Gold
Sultans of Swing: Live in Germany	Released: 5 February 2011; Label: Sony	—	—	—	—	12	—	
Stratospheric Sounds: Live in Basel, Switzerland, 1992	Released: 8 April 2011; Label: Showtime	—	—	—	—	—	3	
"—" denotes items that did not chart or were not released in that territory.

== Various artists home video ==
Title	Video/DVD details
Live at Knebworth	Includes three Dire Straits tracks; Released: 2002; Label: Eagle

== Music videos ==
Year	Title	Director	Album
1978	"Sultans of Swing"	unknown	Dire Straits
1978	"Wild West End"	unknown	Dire Straits
1979	"Lady Writer"	unknown	Communiqué
1981	"Romeo and Juliet"	Lester Bookbinder	Making Movies
1981	"Skateaway"	Lester Bookbinder	Making Movies
1981	"Tunnel of Love"	Lester Bookbinder	Making Movies
1982	"Private Investigations"	unknown	Love over Gold
1983	"Twisting by the Pool"	unknown	ExtendedancEPlay
1985	"So Far Away"	Steve Barron	Brothers in Arms
1985	"Money for Nothing"	Steve Barron	Brothers in Arms
1985	"Brothers in Arms"	Bill Mather	Brothers in Arms
1986	"Walk of Life"	Stephen R. Johnson	Brothers in Arms
1991	"Calling Elvis"	Gerry Anderson	On Every Street
1991	"Heavy Fuel"	Steve Barron	On Every Street
1992	"The Bug"	Richard Jernigan	On Every Street
