= Hal Lindes discography =

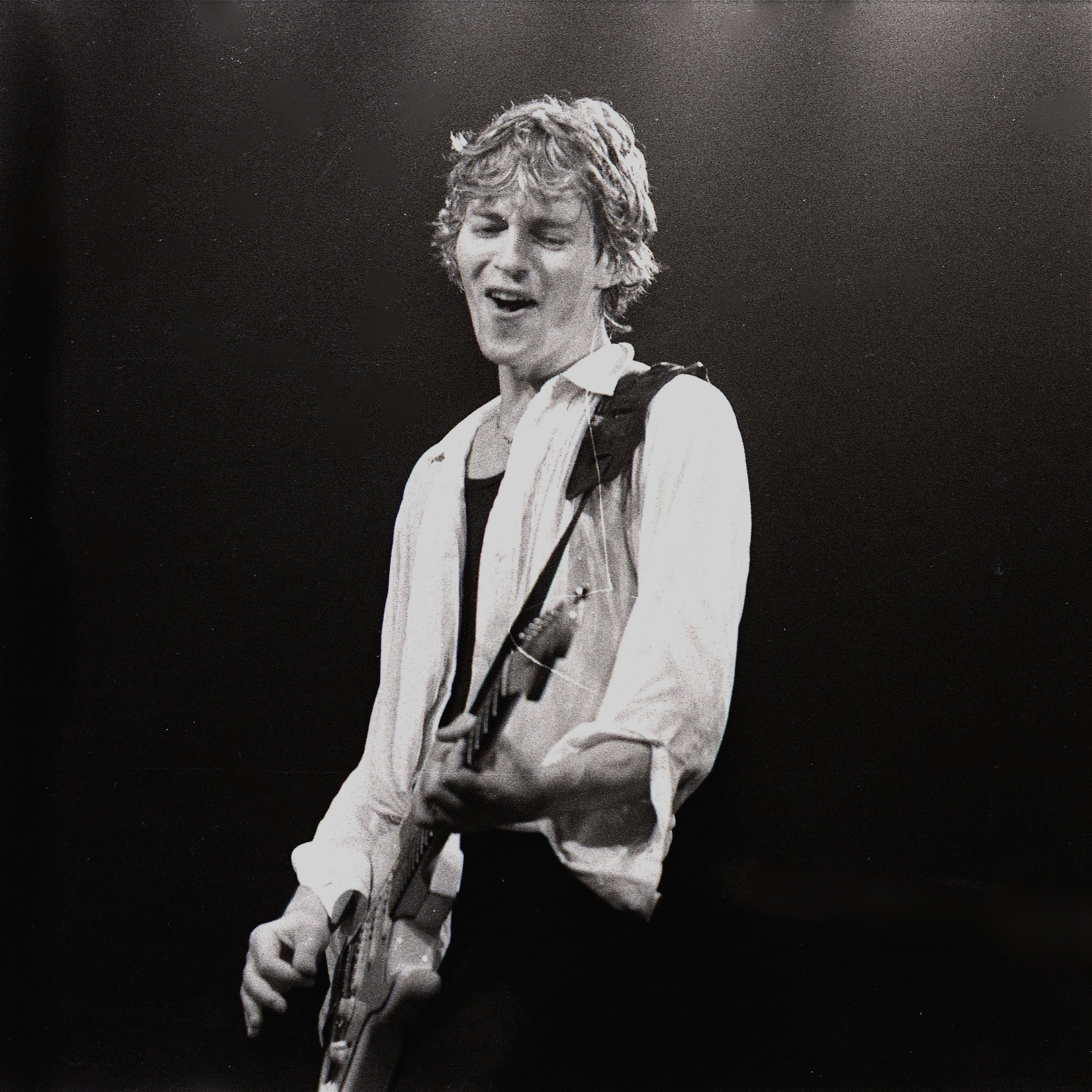
- Hal Lindes with Dire Straits in June, 1981
- Studio albums: 2
- Soundtrack albums: 7
- Singles: 4
- Music videos: 8
- Collaborative albums and singles: 58
- Film and TV scores: 61

The Hal Lindes discography consists of recordings and film/TV scores by the American guitarist and film score composer Hal Lindes. He is best known as a member of Dire Straits from 1980 until late 1984 and also for his collaborations with musicians like Johnny Hallyday, Tina Turner, Gary Brooker, Roger Daltrey, Chris Jagger, Al Kooper, Brian Tarquin, Steve Morse, Robben Ford, Kiki Dee, Fish, Russ Taff, Sabrina, Twiggy.

Since 1984, with an interest initially sparked by the Local Hero soundtrack recording sessions, Lindes also pursued film composing, with over 60 film and TV scores composed. He has won a Royal Television Society Award for the BAFTA award nominated film Reckless and a TRIC award for Best TV Theme Music. Lindes composed the soundtrack to The Boys Are Back, a Miramax film directed by Scott Hicks and starring Clive Owen, in which his guitar score is paired with songs by Sigur Rós, Ray Lamontagne and Carla Bruni. He also composed the theme music for the 1990s BBC TV series Between the Lines.

== Albums ==
- Guitar Heart (2011)
- Lone Guitar (2014)

== Singles ==
- Ricarda (2010)
- Babe I’m Gonna Leave You (2010)
- Inspired By An Angel (2015)
- Song For An Irish Girl (2020)

== Collaborative albums and singles ==
With Darling

Album:

- Put It Down T Experience (1979)

Singles:

- Do Ya Wanna / Stuck On You (7", 1979)
- Charisma (1979)

With Dire Straits

- Love over Gold (1982)
- Twisting by the Pool (1983)
- Alchemy (1984)
- Money For Nothing (1988)
- Live At The BBC (1995)

With Mark Knopfler

- Going Home (Local Hero) (1983)
- Freeway Flyer (Local Hero) (1983)

With Johnny Koonce

- Got My Eye On You (Got My Eye On You) (1983)

With Tina Turner

- Private Dancer (Private Dancer) (1984)
- Steel Claw (Private Dancer) (1984)

With Kiki Dee

- Stay Close To You (Angel Eyes) (1987)
- I Fall In Love Too Easily (Angel Eyes) (1987)
- Angel Eyes (Angel Eyes) (1987)

With Russ Taff

- Guiding Light (The Way Home) (1989)

Got My Eye On You With Chris Daniels & The Kings

- Got My Eye On You (That's What I Like About The South) (1989)

With Fish

- Vigil in a Wilderness of Mirrors (1990)

With Sabrina

- Dirty Boy Look (Over the Pop) (1991)

With The Tornados

- Telstar (1992)

With Various Artists

- Easy Trail (Picturesque) (1992)
- Country Guitars (Jingles and Themes) (1996)
- Sun Daze (Ambient Grooves) (2004)
- A Wry Look (2009)

With Nicholas Pike

- Celtic Tales (2003)

With Al Kooper

- Got My Ion Hue (Black Coffee) (2005)

With Ian Livingstone

- Life Stories (2009)

With Luan Parle

- Riding The Storm (The Full Circle) (2010)
- Running In Circles (The Full Circle) (2010)
- Lonely World (Never Say Goodbye) (2020)

With Brian Tarquin (APM / Sonoton)

- Aphrodite (2010)
- You Know What I Mean (2010)
- Bettie (2010)
- The Big Sleep (2021)
- Orlando In Heven (2021)
- Sucka Punch (2021)
- Sand & Blood (2021)
- Emotional Vocals (2021)
- Distant Light (2021)
- Aphrodite (2021)
- Blues Guitars All Stars (2022)
- Rock Orchestral Action (2022)
- Hip Hop Rockestral Supreme (2023)
- LoFi Christmas Hip Hop (2023)
- Quiet Desperation (2024)
- Ultimate Olympic Score (2024)
- Beats Underscore (2024)
- Adrenaline Fueled Score (2024)
- Indie Palooza (2024)

With Robert Homes and James Homes

- Down to the Swamp (2015)

With Maryen Cairns

- Granny Lum Loy (Femina Australis) (2016)
- Smoking Gun (Femina Australis) (2016)
- Lady Bushranger (Femina Australis) (2016)

With Dominik Johnson and Alex Tschallener

- Acoustic Traveler (2017)

With Chris Constantinou

- A Walk In The Woods (2018)
- New Wave Funk Rock (NWFR) (2018)
- Homebound (2020)
- Folk Hop (2024)

With RudeGRL + CC

- Anthemic Hip Hop (2020)

With Evangeline Lindes

- Out Of My Mind (2020)

With One Thousand Motels

- Get In Where You Fit In (2021)

With David Knopfler

- This Isn’t Kansas Anymore (Songs Of Loss And Love) (2020)
- LA Rain (Crow Gifts) (2024)

With Sunset Donkeys

- Setting It All On Fire (2024)

== Film and TV score albums composer ==
- Theme from Between the Lines

Various – 100 Greatest TV Themes (The Ultimate Television Themes Collection) (2002)

- The Boys Are Back - Score (2010)
- Sleeping with Strangers (Eamon's Theme)

Easy Listening (Music Inspired By The ITV Series Big Bad World) (1999)

- NY-LON

Various – Music From The Drama Series Ny-Lon: A Transatlantic Romance (2004)

- Apparitions (Music From The TV Series) (2008)
- Reckless Original Score (1997)
- The Syndicate (Music From The TV Series) (2012 – 2021)

== Film and TV scores ==
Year	Title	Notes
1987	CBS Summer Playhouse	TV Series (one episode)
1988	Joyriders	Film
1990	Screen Two	TV series Ep. Drowning in the Shallow End
1988	TECX	TV series (13 episodes)
1991	Legacy: The Origins of Civilization	TV mini series (6 episodes)
1992	The Guilty	TV mini series (2 episodes)
1992–1994	Between the Lines	TV series
1992	Screen One	TV series (Ep. Born Kicking)
1993	A Statement of Affairs	TV mini series (one episode)
1993	The Secrets of Lake Success	TV mini series
1994	Deadly Advice	Film
1994	Bermuda Grace	TV film
1994	The Coriolis Effect	Short film
1994	Don't Do It	Film
1995	Thief Takers	TV series (one episode)
1995	The Infiltrator	Film
1995	Is This Your Life?	TV series (3 episodes)
1995	The Great Kandinsky	TV film
1995	The Mediator	TV film
1995–1996	Band of Gold	TV series
1996	Kiss and Tell	TV film
1997	Reckless	TV series
1997	The Vanishing Man	TV series (one episode)
1997	Gold	TV series (6 episodes)
1997	Police 2020	TV pilot
1998	Gunshy	Film
1998	Reckless: The Sequel	TV film
1999	Big Bad World	TV series (6 episodes)
2000	Forgive and Forget	TV film
2000	This Is Personal: The Hunt for the Yorkshire Ripper	TV mini series
2000	The Blind Date	TV series
2000	Vent de colère	TV film
2001	Best of Both Worlds	TV series
2001	The Hunt	TV film
2001	The Whistle-Blower	TV series
2001	Red Cap	TV series
2002	Local Boys	Film
2003	Alibi	TV film
2003	Nature	TV series (2 episodes)
2004	In Denial of Murder	TV film
2004	NY-LON	TV series (6 episodes)
1996–2005	Airport	TV series (title music)
2005	ShakespeaRe-Told	TV mini series
2005	Perfect Day	TV film
2005	Lucky 13	Film
2006	1969	Short film
2006	The Complete Guide to Parenting	TV series (6 episodes)
2006	Losing Gemma	TV series (2 episodes)
2007	Girl 27	Documentary
2007	Little Devil	TV mini series (3 episodes)
2008	Apparitions	TV series
2009	The Boys Are Back	Film
2009	Albert's Memorial	TV film
2009	Off the Ledge	Film
2010	Accidental Farmer	TV film
2011	Fast Freddie, The Widow and Me	TV film
2014–2016	In the Club	TV series (12 episodes)
2018	La La Means I Love You	Short film
2018	Girlfriends	TV series (6 episodes)
2018	Lost Fare	Film
2012 – 2021	The Syndicate	TV series

== Music videos ==
Year	Title	Album
1980	Solid Rock	Making Movies
1982	Private Investigations	Love over Gold
1982	Love over Gold	Love over Gold
1982	Two Young Lovers	Alchemy: Dire Straits Live
1983	Twisting By The Pool	ExtendedancEPlay
1983	Alchemy	Alchemy: Dire Straits Live
1983	Sultans Of Swing	Alchemy: Dire Straits Live
1984	Expresso Love	Alchemy: Dire Straits Live
