= List of Dire Straits band members =

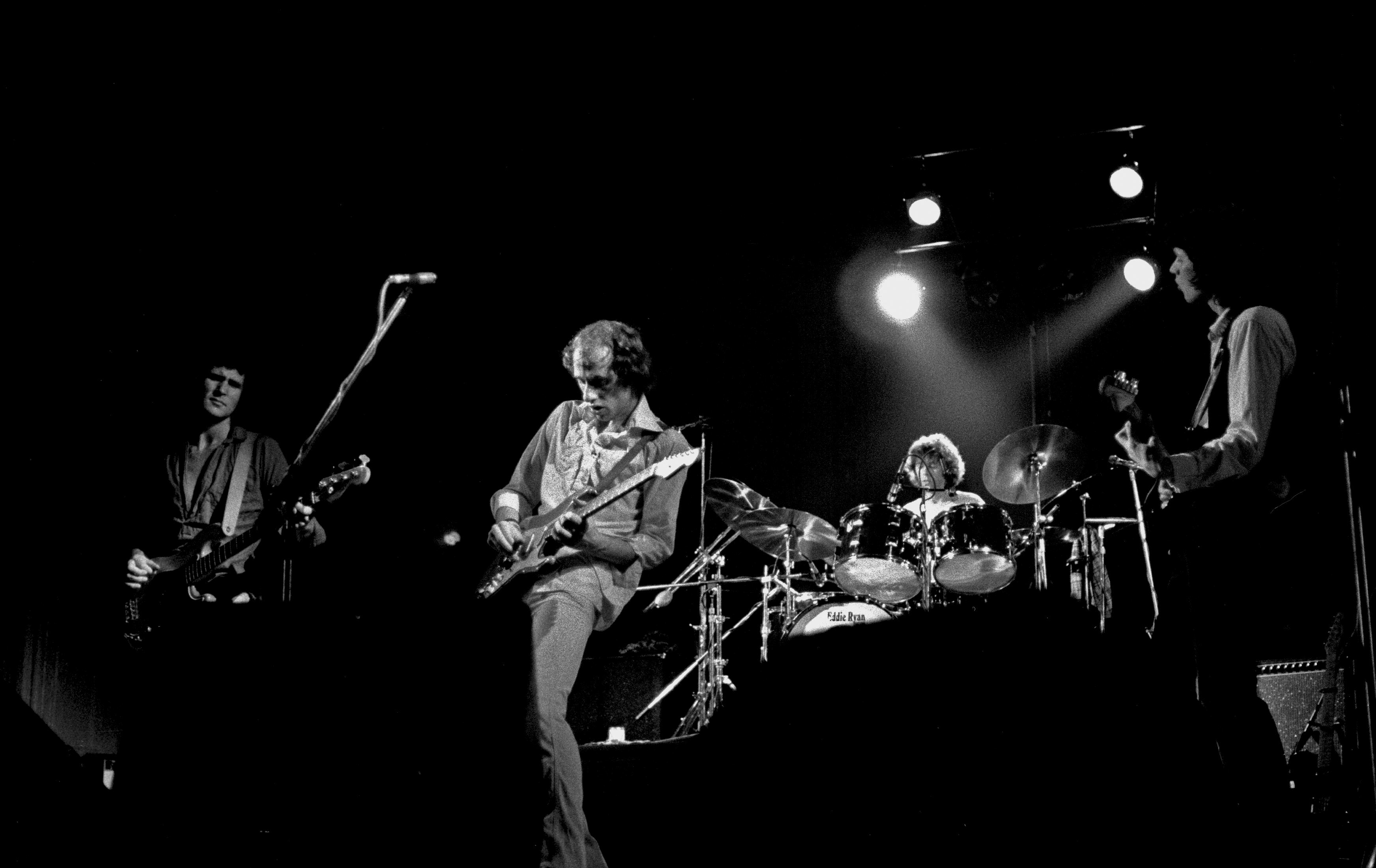
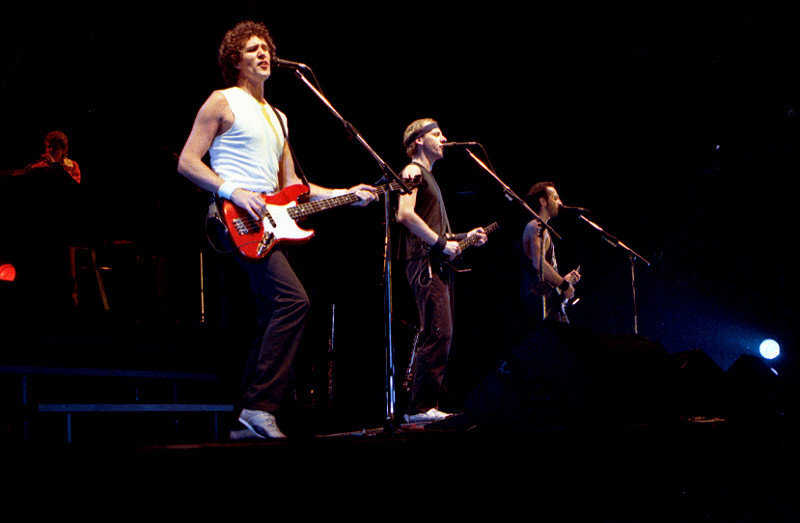
Two lineups of Dire Straits performing in 1978 (top) and 1985 (bottom).

Dire Straits were a British rock band formed in London in June 1977. The group originally comprised the Knopfler brothers Mark (lead vocals, lead guitar) and David (rhythm guitar, backing vocals), John Illsley (bass, backing vocals), and Pick Withers (drums). At the time of their first breakup in September 1988, the band comprised Mark Knopfler, Illsley, Jack Sonni (rhythm guitar, backing vocals), Terry Williams (drums), Alan Clark (keyboards), and Guy Fletcher (keyboards, backing vocals). Mark Knopfler, Illsley, Clark and Fletcher reformed as Dire Straits in 1990, undertaking one more studio album and world tour with backup musicians before their second and final breakup in 1995.

== History ==
=== 1977–1988 ===
Dire Straits was formed in June 1977 by Mark and David Knopfler, John Illsley and Pick Withers. The band released their first two studio albums, Dire Straits and Communiqué, in 1978 and 1979, respectively. On the 1979 Communiqué Tour, Joop de Korte began working with the band as a roadie and off-stage percussionist. David Knopfler left the group during the recording of their third album Making Movies in July 1980, following an argument with Mark which prompted him to return to the UK and start a solo career. After the album, which featured Roy Bittan on keyboards, was released in October 1980, Hal Lindes was announced as Knopfler's replacement, while keyboardist Alan Clark was also added. Withers remained until shortly after the completion of the band's fourth album Love over Gold (released in September 1982) at which point he left and was replaced by former Rockpile drummer Terry Williams.

During the Love over Gold Tour, Dire Straits added keyboardist Tommy Mandel and King Crimson saxophonist Mel Collins to their touring lineup, both of whom were featured on the live release Alchemy: Dire Straits Live. In late 1984, Guy Fletcher was added to the band's lineup as a second keyboardist. Lindes left shortly afterwards, during the recording of Brothers in Arms and his place was taken by Jack Sonni. Also during the recording sessions, Williams was temporarily replaced by Omar Hakim, although both are credited with contributing to the album. Williams was back in the band for the album's promotional concert tour which lasted from April 1985 to April 1986, the lineup of which also featured saxophonist and flautist Chris White.

After a break from touring, Dire Straits regrouped for the Nelson Mandela 70th Birthday Tribute concert staged on 11 June 1988 at Wembley Stadium, at which they were the headline act. As Sonni was unable to play the show, Eric Clapton took his place. This also concluded Jack Sonni’s and Terry Williams’ time as Dire Straits members, and was the last show with roadie/touring percussionist Joop de Korte.

On 15 September 1988, Knopfler announced the disbanding of Dire Straits. Speaking in a Rolling Stone interview about the breakup, the band's frontman stated that "There's not an accent then on the music, there's an accent on popularity. I needed a rest."

=== 1990–1995 ===
On 30 June 1990 the four remaining members of Dire Straits - Mark Knopfler, John Illsley, Alan Clark and Guy Fletcher - reunited for a performance at Knebworth Festival. They were joined by Eric Clapton and his band – guitarist Phil Palmer, bassist Nathan East, drummer Steve Ferrone, keyboardist Greg Phillinganes, and backing vocalists Katie Kissoon and Tessa Niles.

In late 1990/early 1991 Dire Straits officially reformed, with Knopfler, Illsley, Clark and Fletcher recording their final studio album On Every Street (released in September 1991) with a host of session musicians, including Toto drummer Jeff Porcaro. The album's concert tour featured On Every Street contributors Palmer, Chris White, Paul Franklin (pedal steel guitar) and Danny Cummings (percussion), and drummer Chris Whitten, all of whom featured on the live releases On the Night and Encores.

Following another hiatus, Dire Straits' final album Live at the BBC (released in 1995) was a contractual release featuring live recordings from 1978 to 1981, with the original line-up of Mark and David Knopfler, Illsley and Pick Withers (Clark and Lindes also featured on one track). In 1995, Mark Knopfler disbanded Dire Straits for the second time, choosing to focus on his solo career.

== Members ==
=== Official ===
Image	Name	Years active	Instruments	Release contributions
	Mark Knopfler	1977–1988; 1990–1995	lead vocals; lead and rhythm guitars	all Dire Straits releases
	John Illsley	1977–1988; 1990–1995	bass; backing vocals	all Dire Straits releases
	David "Pick" Withers	1977–1982	drums; occasional backing vocals	Dire Straits (1978); Communiqué (1979); Making Movies (1980); Love over Gold (1982); Live at the BBC (1995); The Honky Tonk Demos (2015); Live at the Rainbow, 1979 (2023)
	David Knopfler	1977–1980	rhythm guitar; backing vocals	Dire Straits (1978); Communiqué (1979); Live at the BBC (1995); The Honky Tonk Demos (2015); Live at the Rainbow, 1979 (2023)
	Alan Clark	1980–1988; 1990–1995	keyboards; piano	all Dire Straits releases from Love over Gold (1982) to Live at the BBC (1995); San Antonio Live in 85 (2025)
	Hal Lindes	1980–1984	rhythm guitar; backing vocals	Love over Gold (1982); ExtendedancEPlay (1983); Alchemy: Dire Straits Live (1984); Live at the BBC (1995)
	Terry Williams	1982–1988	drums	ExtendedancEPlay (1983); Alchemy: Dire Straits Live (1984); Brothers in Arms (1985); San Antonio Live in 85 (2025)
	Guy Fletcher	1984–1988; 1990–1995	keyboards; synthesisers; backing vocals	all Dire Straits releases from Brothers In Arms (1985) to Encores (1993); San Antonio Live in 85 (2025)
	Jack Sonni	1984–1988 (died 2023)	rhythm guitar; backing vocals	Brothers in Arms (1985); San Antonio Live in 85 (2025)

=== Touring and session musicians ===
Image	Name	Years active	Instruments	Release contributions
	Barry Beckett	1978 (session) (died 2009)	keyboards	Communiqué (1979)
	Joop de Korte	1979–1988 (touring)	percussion	Alchemy: Dire Straits Live (1984); Live at the BBC (1995); Live at the Rainbow, 1979 (2023); San Antonio Live in 85 (2025)
	Roy Bittan	1980 (session)	keyboards	Making Movies (1980)
	Sid McGinnis	1980 (session)	guitars	Making Movies (1980)
	Ed Walsh	1982 (session)	synthesiser programming	Love over Gold (1982)
	Mike Mainieri	1982 (session); 1984–1985 (session)	vibraphone; marimba	Love over Gold (1982); Brothers in Arms (1985)
	Mel Collins	1982–1983 (session/touring)	saxophone	ExtendedancEPlay (1983); Alchemy: Dire Straits Live (1984)
	Tommy Mandel	1982–1983 (touring)	keyboards	Alchemy: Dire Straits Live (1984)
	Michael Brecker	1984–1985 (session) (died 2007)	saxophone	Brothers in Arms (1985)
	Malcolm Duncan	1984–1985 (session) (died 2019)	saxophone	Brothers in Arms (1985)
	Omar Hakim	1984–1985 (session)	drums	Brothers in Arms (1985)
	Randy Brecker	1984–1985 (session)	brass	Brothers in Arms (1985)
	Neil Jason	1984–1985 (session)	bass	Brothers in Arms (1985)
	Tony Levin	1984–1985 (session)	bass, Chapman Stick	Brothers in Arms (1985)
	Dave Plews	1984–1985 (session)	trumpet	Brothers in Arms (1985)
	Sting	1984–1985 (session)	vocals	Brothers in Arms (1985)
	Jimmy Maelen	1984–1985 (session) (died 1988)	percussion	Brothers in Arms (1985)
	Chris White	1985–1988 (touring); 1990–1992 (session/touring)	saxophone; backing vocals; flute; percussion	On Every Street (1991); On the Night (1993); Encores (1993); San Antonio Live in 85 (2025)
	Phil Palmer	1990–1992 (session/touring)	rhythm guitar; backing vocals	On Every Street (1991); On the Night (1993); Encores (1993)
	Paul Franklin	1990–1992 (session/touring)	pedal steel guitar	On Every Street (1991); On the Night (1993); Encores (1993)
	Danny Cummings	1990–1992 (session/touring)	percussion; backing vocals	On Every Street (1991); On the Night (1993); Encores (1993)
	Vince Gill	1990–1991 (session)	guitar; backing vocals	On Every Street (1991)
	Manu Katché	1990–1991 (session)	drums; percussion	On Every Street (1991)
	Jeff Porcaro	1990–1991 (session) (died 1992)	drums; percussion	On Every Street (1991)
	George Martin	1990–1991 (session) (died 2016)	string arranger; conductor	On Every Street (1991)
	Chris Whitten	1991–1992 (touring)	drums	On the Night (1993); Encores (1993)

== Lineups ==
Period	Members	Releases
June 1977 – July 1980	Mark Knopfler – lead vocals, lead guitar; David Knopfler – rhythm guitar, backing vocals; John Illsley – bass, backing vocals; Pick Withers – drums	Dire Straits (1978); Communiqué (1979); Live at the BBC (1995); The Honky Tonk Demos (2015); Live at the Rainbow, 1979 (2023)
July – October 1980	Mark Knopfler – lead vocals, guitars; John Illsley – bass, backing vocals; Pick Withers – drums, backing vocals	Making Movies (1980)
October 1980 – October 1982	Mark Knopfler – lead vocals, lead guitar; John Illsley – bass, backing vocals; Pick Withers – drums; Hal Lindes – rhythm guitar, backing vocals; Alan Clark – keyboards, piano	Love over Gold (1982); ExtendedancEPlay (1983) – one track only; Live at the BBC (1995) – one track only
October 1982 – December 1984	Mark Knopfler – lead vocals, lead guitar; John Illsley – bass, backing vocals; Hal Lindes – rhythm guitar, backing vocals; Alan Clark – keyboards, piano; Terry Williams – drums	ExtendedancEPlay (1983); Alchemy: Dire Straits Live (1984)
December 1984 – April 1986 Band on hiatus April 1986 – June 1990 with one-off show on 11 June 1988	Mark Knopfler – lead vocals, lead guitar; John Illsley – bass, backing vocals; Alan Clark – keyboards, piano; Terry Williams – drums; Jack Sonni – rhythm guitar, backing vocals (absent from 1988 show for family reasons); Guy Fletcher – keyboards, backing vocals	Brothers in Arms (1985); San Antonio Live in 85 (2025)
June 1990 – 1995	Mark Knopfler – lead vocals, lead guitar; John Illsley – bass, backing vocals; Alan Clark – keyboards, piano; Guy Fletcher – keyboards, backing vocals	Live at Knebworth (1990) – two tracks only; On Every Street (1991); On The Night (1993); Encores (1993)
