= Terry Williams (drummer) =

Welsh rock drummer (born 1948)

- Born: Terrence Williams; 11 January 1948 (age 78); Swansea, Wales
- Genres: Progressive rock; rock; blues
- Occupation: Musician
- Instrument: Drums
- Years active: 1962–2007
- Formerly of: Love Sculpture; Man; Rockpile; Neverland Express; Dire Straits

Terrence Williams (born 11 January 1948) is a retired Welsh rock drummer. During the 1970s and early 1980s Williams was drummer with Dave Edmunds / Rockpile and Man. Rockpile split in 1981 and Williams joined Dire Straits from 1982 until 1988.

Williams was born in Swansea. During the 1960s, he played in a number of Welsh bands, including Commancheros, the Smokeless Zone, Dream and Plum Crazy, before joining Dave Edmunds' band Love Sculpture. In 1970 he joined the Welsh rock group Man, which included two former Dream and Smokeless Zone members, Deke Leonard and Martin Ace.

Between 1981 and 1982, Williams was part of the Neverland Express band, backing Meat Loaf. In June 1982 Williams joined Dire Straits as the replacement for drummer Pick Withers, shortly after the release of their fourth studio album Love Over Gold. Williams played with them for the first time on the 1983 EP titled ExtendedancEPlay (featuring the hit single "Twisting by the Pool") and on the 1982–1983 Love over Gold Tour. The band's double live album Alchemy: Dire Straits Live was a recording of excerpts from the final two concerts from that eight month long tour at London's Hammersmith Odeon in July 1983, featuring Williams, and was released in March 1984.

During 1983 and 1984, Williams and Dire Straits frontman Mark Knopfler were also involved with other projects outside of Dire Straits, and they both played on Phil Everly's and Cliff Richard's song "She Means Nothing To Me", which was a UK hit single in February 1983, taken from the album "Phil Everly". Knopfler also wrote and produced the music score for the David Puttnam produced film Local Hero. The album was released in April 1983 and Williams played drums on one track, “Freeway Flyer”. This was followed in 1984 by Knopfler's music scores for the films Cal (soundtrack) and Comfort and Joy, both of which Williams contributed to. Also in 1984, Williams played drums on the Knopfler penned track "Private Dancer" for Tina Turner's comeback album of the same name to which other Dire Straits members also contributed, as well as the song "Steel Claw" recorded for the same project.

Williams remained as a full time member of Dire Straits for the recording of their fifth studio album, 1985's Brothers in Arms, however according to a Sound on Sound magazine interview with co-producer Neil Dorfsman, his drumming performance was considered to be unsuitable for the desired sound of the album during the first month of the recording sessions, which led to him being released from the remainder of the sessions and being temporarily replaced by jazz session drummer Omar Hakim, who re-recorded the album's drum parts during a two to three day stay and then left. Williams himself has claimed that he had recorded all his drum parts to a click track, which he felt hindered his ability to channel the rhythmic feel he wanted. Both Hakim and Williams are credited on the album, although Williams' contribution on the finished album was the rockabilly hit single "Walk of Life" and the improvised drum crescendo at the beginning of "Money for Nothing". According to another interview with Neil Dorsman, Williams played toms and tom fills throughout “Money for Nothing” and "Walk of Life", while Omar Hakim played drums on all the remaining tracks on the album. Although he had been sidelined for most of the recording sessions of the album, Williams remained a full time member of Dire Straits and he featured in all the music videos, as well as performing with the band for the duration of the 1985–1986 Brothers in Arms world tour that followed.

After a hiatus of almost two years, Dire Straits regrouped with Eric Clapton to perform at the Nelson Mandela 70th Birthday Tribute concert staged on 11 June 1988 at Wembley Stadium, in which they were the headline act. This was one of the final concerts in which Williams played with Dire Straits. In September 1988 Mark Knopfler announced the official disbanding of Dire Straits and Williams then left the band. The compilation album Money for Nothing was released in October 1988 and featured selections from Williams’ 1982–85 tenure with the band. Dire Straits regrouped for a one off charity concert in Newcastle in October 1989 with Williams on drums. This was his last ever concert with the band. Dire Straits regrouped in 1990 and again in 1991 without Williams as drummer.

In 1988, Williams played drums on albums by Graham Parker and Nick Lowe.

== Discography ==
With Billy Bremner

- Bash! (1984)

With Carlene Carter

- Carlene Carter (1978)
- Musical Shapes (1980)
- C'est C Bon (1983)

With Cliff Richard

- Rock Connection (1984)

With Dave Edmunds / Rockpile

- Rockpile (1972)
- Get It (1977)
- Tracks on Wax 4 (1978)
- Repeat When Necessary (1979)
- Seconds of Pleasure (1980)
- Twangin... (1981)
- Riff Raff/I Hear You Rockin (2002) compilation
- They Call It Rock

With Deke Leonard

- Iceberg (1973)
- Kamikaze (1974)
- Before Your Very Eyes (1981)

With Dion

- Yo Frankie (1989)

With Dire Straits

- ExtendedancEPlay (1983)
- Alchemy: Dire Straits Live (1984)
- Brothers in Arms (1985)
- Money for Nothing (1988) compilation
- Sultans of Swing: The Very Best of Dire Straits (1998) compilation
- The Best of Dire Straits & Mark Knopfler: Private Investigations (2005) compilation

With Graham Parker

- The Mona Lisa's Sister (1988)
- Passion Is No Ordinary Word (1993) 1976-1991 era compilation
- No Holding Back (1996) compilation
- Ultimate Collection (2001) compilation

With John Illsley

- Never Told a Soul (1984)
- K. Wallis B. And The Dark Shades Of Night – Diamonds (1987)

With Man

- To Live for to Die (1970)
- Man (1971)
- Do You Like It Here Now, Are You Settling In? (1971)
- Greasy Truckers Party (1972)
- Live at the Padget Rooms, Penarth (1972)
- Be Good to Yourself at Least Once a Day (1972)
- Live at the Rainbow 1972 (1972)
- Christmas at the Patti (1973)
- Back into the Future (1973)
- Rhinos, Winos, and Lunatics (1974)
- Slow Motion (1974)
- 1999 Party Tour (1974)
- Maximum Darkness (1975)
- The Welsh Connection (1976)
- All's Well That Ends Well (1977)
- Rare Man (1999)
- Undrugged (2002) (1996 sessions)

With Mark Knopfler

- Local Hero (1983)
- Cal (soundtrack) (1984)
- Comfort and Joy (1984)
- Screenplaying (1993) compilation

With Mickey Jupp

- Juppanese (1978)

With The Motors

- Tenement Steps (1980)

With Nick Lowe

- Jesus of Cool (Pure Pop for Now People in US) (1978)
- Cruel to Be Kind (1979)
- Labour of Lust (1979)
- Nick the Knife (1982)
- 16 All Time Lowes (1984) compilation
- Nick's Knack (1986) compilation
- Pinker and Prouder than Previous (1988)
- Quiet Please... The New Best of Nick Lowe (2009) compilation

With Paul Brady

- Full Moon (1986)

With The Everly Brothers

- Phil Everly (1983)
- EB 84 (1984)
- Mercury Years (1993) compilation

With Tina Turner

- Private Dancer (1984)
- Simply the Best (1991) compilation

With Tracey Ullman

- You Caught Me Out (1984)
- Takes on the Hits (2002) compilation

With Willie and the Poor Boys (Bill Wyman)

- Willie and the Poor Boys (1985)
- Poor Boy Boogie (2006) compilation

Also

Stiffs Live (1978) Plays with: Nick Lowe's Last Chicken in the Shop, Larry Wallis' Psychedelic Rowdies and Ian Dury & the Blockheads
