= Lindes (surname) =

Lindes is a surname. Notable people with the surname include:

- Hal Lindes, American–English guitarist and film score composer
- Helen Lindes (born 1981), Spanish actress and model
- Staz Lindes (born 1993), English-American fashion model and musician

== See also ==
- Madam Lindes Institut, a Danish girls' school, active in Copenhagen from 1786 to 1845
