= Hal Lindes =

American musician (born 1953)

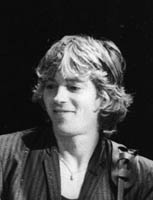
- Lindes performing with Dire Straits

Background information
- Born: Harold Andrew Lindes; 30 June 1953 (age 73); Monterey, California, U.S.
- Genres: Rock
- Occupations: Musician, songwriter, film composer, music producer
- Instruments: Guitar, vocals
- Years active: 1979–present
- Labels: Virgin EMI, Sony Music, BMG, Universal
- Website: www.hallindes.com

Harold Andrew Lindes (born 30 June 1953) is an American guitarist and film score composer best known for his time as a member of Dire Straits from 1980 until late 1984.

== Early life and career ==
Lindes was born in Monterey, California, went to high school in Washington, D.C., and attended Maryland University. He moved to London in 1975. In 1979, Lindes played guitar with the new wave group Darling. Signed to Charisma Records, they released the single "Do You Wanna" (written by Lindes) and published the album Put It Down To Experience the same year, before breaking up.

At the time of being asked to join Dire Straits, Al Kooper was producing Lindes at Basing Street Studios in London with Herbie Flowers on bass, Brad Bradbury of the Specials on drums, Kooper on keyboards and Lindes on guitar and vocals.

== Dire Straits (1980–1984) ==
Lindes became a full-time member of Dire Straits in 1980, before the release of the group's third album, Making Movies. He replaced original co-founding member and rhythm guitarist David Knopfler. Lindes toured with Dire Straits while they were promoting Making Movies and remained with the band while they recorded their fourth album, 1982's Love Over Gold. Lindes was also with the band for the EP titled ExtendedancEPlay released in early 1983, which included the hit single “Twisting by the Pool”.

Also during 1982 and 1983, Dire Straits’ frontman Mark Knopfler was involved with composing the music score for David Puttnam's film Local Hero, in which Lindes also performed. Lindes toured with Dire Straits for their 1982–1983 Love over Gold Tour. The band's double live album Alchemy: Dire Straits Live was a recording of excerpts from the final two concerts from that tour at London's Hammersmith Odeon in July 1983, featuring Lindes, and was released in March 1984.

In December 1984, while Dire Straits were recording tracks for their Brothers In Arms album, Lindes left the band to pursue his interest in film composing, sparked by the Local Hero soundtrack recording sessions.

== Film scores and other work (1984–present) ==
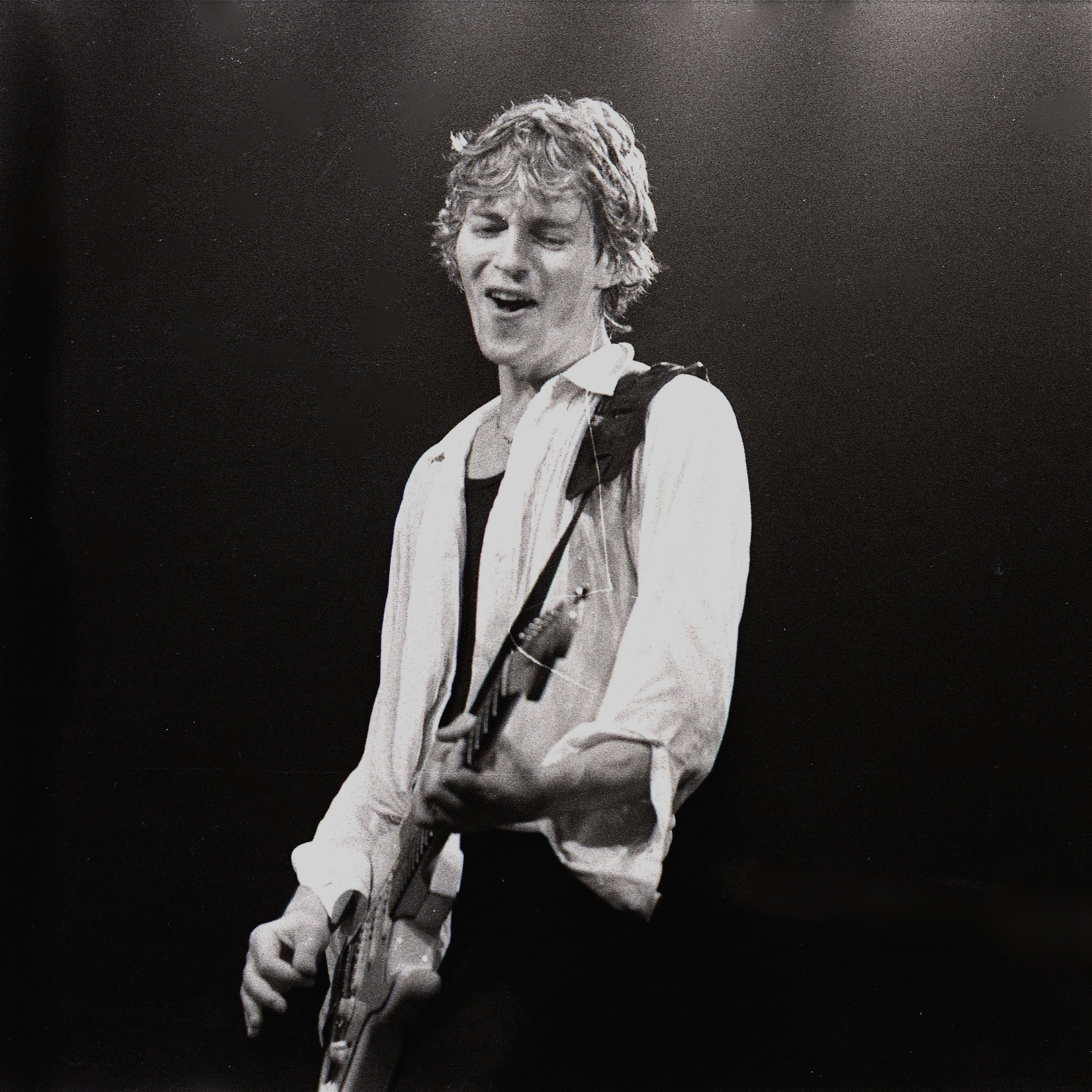
Lindes with Dire Straits in June 1981

In 1984, Lindes played guitar alongside Jeff Beck on Tina Turner's hit "Private Dancer", as well as on the song "Steel Claw" recorded for the same project.

Since his departure from Dire Straits, Lindes has composed music for films, and has won a Royal Television Society Award for the BAFTA award nominated film Reckless and a TRIC award for Best TV Theme Music. Lindes composed the soundtrack to The Boys Are Back, a Miramax film directed by Scott Hicks and starring Clive Owen, in which his guitar score is paired with songs by Sigur Rós, Ray Lamontagne and Carla Bruni.

In 1989, Lindes teamed up with rock singer Fish to contribute guitar to his debut solo album following his departure from Marillion. Vigil in a Wilderness of Mirrors was released in January 1990, and Lindes featured on nearly all of the album's tracks as well as co-writing three songs on the album. Lindes declined the opportunity to join Fish’s touring band. He composed the theme music for the 1990s BBC TV series Between the Lines.

Lindes has written, produced and recorded with Johnny Hallyday, Tina Turner, Gary Brooker, Roger Daltrey, Chris Jagger, Al Kooper, Brian Tarquin, Steve Morse, Robben Ford, Kiki Dee, Fish, Russ Taff, Sabrina, Twiggy.

== Personal life ==
Lindes is married to Ricarda Ankenbrand Lindes. He has four children and is the father of actress Evangeline Lindes, musician and Saint Laurent model Staz Lindes, and singer and artist Misha Lindes.

== Discography ==
Recordings (selection)

With Dire Straits

- Love over Gold (1982)
- Twisting by the Pool (1983)
- Alchemy (1984)
- Money For Nothing (1988)
- Live At The BBC (1995)

With Mark Knopfler

- Going Home (Local Hero) (1983)
- Freeway Flyer (Local Hero) (1983)

With Tina Turner

- Private Dancer (1984)
- Steel Claw (1984)

With Kiki Dee

- Stay Close To You (1987)
- I Fall In Love Too Easily (1987)
- Angel Eyes (1987)

With Fish

- Vigil in a Wilderness of Mirrors (1990)

With Al Kooper

- Black Coffee (2005)

Film and TV score albums composer (selection)

- Theme from Between the Lines

Various – 100 Greatest TV Themes (The Ultimate Television Themes Collection) (2002)

- The Boys Are Back - Score (2010)
- Sleeping with Strangers (Eamon's Theme)

Easy Listening (Music Inspired By The ITV Series Big Bad World) (1999)

- NY-LON

Various – Music From The Drama Series Ny-Lon: A Transatlantic Romance (2004)

- Apparitions (Music From The TV Series) (2008)
- Reckless Original Score (1997)
- The Syndicate (Music From The TV Series) (2012 – 2021)

Single releases

- Ricarda (2010)
- Babe I’m Gonna Leave You (2010)
- Guitar Heart (2011)
- Lone Guitar (2014)
- Inspired By An Angel (2015)
- Song For An Irish Girl (2020)

== Filmography ==
=== Films and TV productions ===
Film and TV score composer (selection)

Year	Title	Notes
1988	Joyriders	Film
1990	Screen Two	TV series Ep. Drowning in the Shallow End
1992–1994	Between the Lines	TV series
1993	The Secrets of Lake Success	TV mini series
1994	Bermuda Grace	TV film
1995	The Infiltrator	Film
1995–1996	Band of Gold	TV series
1996	Kiss and Tell	TV film
1997	Reckless	TV series
2000	This Is Personal: The Hunt for the Yorkshire Ripper	TV mini series
2003	Alibi	TV film
2004	ShakespeaRe-Told	TV mini series
2005	NY-LON	TV series
2007	Girl 27	Documentary
2008	Apparitions	TV series
2010	The Boys Are Back	Film
2012 – 2021	The Syndicate	TV series

Actor

Year	Title	Role	Notes
1990	Screen Two	Floyd	Series 6 Ep. Drowning in the Shallow End
1997	FairyTale: A True Story	Angel	
2018	Stranger Thoughts To Get Out	Grandma Rosi	Short Film

=== Music videos ===
Year	Title	Album
1980	Solid Rock	Making Movies
1982	Private Investigations	Love over Gold
1982	Love over Gold	Love over Gold
1982	Two Young Lovers	Alchemy: Dire Straits Live
1983	Twisting By The Pool	ExtendedancEPlay
1983	Alchemy	Alchemy: Dire Straits Live
1983	Sultans Of Swing	Alchemy: Dire Straits Live
1984	Expresso Love	Alchemy: Dire Straits Live
