= Telegraph Road (song) =

Promotional single by Dire Straits

from the album Love over Gold
- Released: 1982
- Genre: Progressive rock; art rock
- Length: 14:18 (album version) 5:05 (single edit)
- Label: Vertigo
- Songwriter: Mark Knopfler
- Producer: Mark Knopfler

"Telegraph Road" is a song by British rock band Dire Straits, written by Mark Knopfler. It is the opening track on the 1982 album Love over Gold.

== Release and live performances ==
The song was first played live at the opening concert of the band's "Making Movies" Australian tour (Perth Entertainment Centre, 22 March 1981) as the final encore. "Telegraph Road" became a staple of Dire Straits and Mark Knopfler solo tours. A slightly shorter live version of the song is included in the 1984 live album Alchemy: Dire Straits Live, and a remixed edit of that performance is included in their 1988 greatest hits album Money for Nothing. The original studio version is the opening track on the double disc version of the compilation The Best of Dire Straits & Mark Knopfler: Private Investigations. The song was cut down to 5:05 for a single release in 1983, with "Twisting By The Pool" as the B-side.

== Meaning and inspiration ==
Telegraph Road is a major north-south 70-mile (110 km) thoroughfare in Michigan, and Mark Knopfler was inspired to write the song while riding in the front of the tour bus, which made the journey down Telegraph Road. At the same time, Knopfler was reading the novel Growth of the Soil by the Nobel Prize winning Norwegian author Knut Hamsun and he was inspired to put the two together and write a song about the beginning of the development along Telegraph Road and the changes over the ensuing decades.

== Composition ==
The song starts out with a quiet crescendo in the key of G minor that lasts almost two minutes, before the song's main theme starts. After the first verse, the main theme plays again, followed by the second verse. After a guitar solo, a short bridge slows the song down to a quiet keyboard portion similar to the intro, followed by a slow guitar solo. Next, the final two verses play with the main theme in between. The main theme is played one last time, followed by a slightly faster guitar solo lasting about five minutes and eventually fading out. "Telegraph Road" is the last song recorded with Pick Withers on drums, as he was replaced by Terry Williams.

== Reception ==
In a contemporary review for Rolling Stone magazine, David Fricke praised "Telegraph Road", and he characterized as a "challenge to the average pop fan's attention span" with its "historic sweep and intimate tension". Loudersound.com ranks "Telegraph Road" 6th among Dire Straits' best songs, while Return of Rock ranks it 5th, describing it as "A fourteen-minute masterpiece worth every second of its length. …it deserves to be on the list of the best long-form songs and progressive rock songs."

== Personnel ==
- Mark Knopfler – vocals, electric guitar and resonator guitar
- John Illsley – bass guitar
- Hal Lindes – electric guitar
- Alan Clark – piano, organ, synthesizers
- Pick Withers – drums

== Certifications ==
Certifications for "Telegraph Road"
Region	Certification	Certified units/sales
New Zealand (RMNZ)	Gold	15,000^{‡}
^{‡} Sales+streaming figures based on certification alone.
