= So Far Away (Dire Straits song) =

Single by Dire Straits

from the album Brothers in Arms
- B-side: "Walk of Life" (UK) "If I Had You" (US)
- Released: 12 April 1985
- Studio: AIR (Salem, Montserrat)
- Genre: Rock; pop rock; heartland rock
- Length: 5:12 (full version); 3:59 (vinyl LP edit)
- Label: Vertigo
- Songwriter: Mark Knopfler
- Producers: Mark Knopfler; Neil Dorfsman

Dire Straits singles chronology
"Love over Gold (Live)" (1984)	"So Far Away" (1985)	"Money for Nothing" (1985)

"So Far Away" is a song by British rock band Dire Straits. It appears as the opening track on their fifth studio album Brothers in Arms (1985). It became the band's fourth top 20 hit, peaking at number 19 in the US. The original studio version of the track appeared on the 2005 compilation The Best of Dire Straits & Mark Knopfler: Private Investigations.

== Reception ==
Cash Box said that "with a punchy guitar hook [it] should walk right into the Top 10."

== Single release ==
"So Far Away" was released as the lead single from Brothers in Arms in the UK and Europe on 12 April 1985. The song charted at number 20 in the UK, but also reached the Top 5 in Norway (number 4), Top 10 in Switzerland (number 6) and Sweden (number 7) and Top 40 in Italy (number 33). The single was also released in Australia and peaked at number 22.

After the song climbed to number 29 on the Billboard Hot Mainstream Rock Tracks chart in 1985, "So Far Away" was released in February 1986 as the album's third single in North America, where it peaked at number 3 on the Hot Adult Contemporary Tracks chart and number 19 on the Billboard Hot 100, giving Dire Straits a third consecutive Top 20 hit from Brothers in Arms on the Hot 100.

== B-side ==
The 1985 European releases of "So Far Away" featured another track from Brothers in Arms, "Walk of Life". This song would itself be released as the fourth official single from the album in Europe (second in North America) in late 1985 reaching number 7 on the Hot 100 and number 2 in the UK – the band's highest ever charted single in their homeland. The 7" featured an edited version of "So Far Away" that was also used on the LP, but the 12" featured the full length version that was on the CD version. It is sometimes erroneously credited as an extended mix.

In the United States, the song used for the B-side was "If I Had You", from Dire Straits' 1983 EP ExtendedancEPlay. In Canada, a Limited Edition double Vinyl featuring the full length version of "So Far Away" was released, along with live renditions of "Going Home" and "Sultans of Swing", the instrumental section of "Why Worry" and a Mark Knopfler solo effort, "Fear and Hatred".

== Live versions ==
A live version was released as the B-Side of the Knopfler solo single Why Aye Man in 2002. One of the songs on Knopfler's 2006 album, Real Live Roadrunning, is a duet version of "So Far Away" with American country-folk singer Emmylou Harris.

== Charts ==
Chart (1985–1986)	Peak Position
Australia (Kent Music Report)	22
Belgium (Ultratop 50 Flanders)	21
Canada Top Singles (RPM)	24
Finnish Singles Chart (Suomen virallinen lista)	13
Ireland (IRMA)	14
Italian Singles Chart	33
Netherlands (Single Top 100)	23
New Zealand (Recorded Music NZ)	25
Norway (VG-lista)	4
South African top 20	5
Spanish Singles Chart	6
Sweden (Sverigetopplistan)	7
Switzerland (Schweizer Hitparade)	6
UK Singles (Official Charts)	20
US Billboard Hot 100	19
US Adult Contemporary (Billboard)	3
US Cash Box Top 100	15

== Certifications ==
Region	Certification	Certified units/sales
Spain (Promusicae)	Gold	30,000^{‡}
New Zealand (RMNZ)	2× Platinum	60,000^{‡}
United Kingdom (BPI)	Silver	200,000^{‡}
^{‡} Sales+streaming figures based on certification alone.

== Personnel ==
- Mark Knopfler – vocals and electric guitars
- John Illsley – bass and backing vocals
- Alan Clark – organ, piano and sampler
- Guy Fletcher – synthesizers and backing vocals
- Omar Hakim – drums and tambourine
