= Sultans of Swing: The Very Best of Dire Straits =

1998 greatest hits album by Dire Straits

Greatest hits album by Dire Straits
- Released: 19 October 1998
- Recorded: 1978–1992
- Genre: Roots rock
- Length: 78:59
- Label: Mercury; Warner (US)

Dire Straits chronology
Live at the BBC (1995)	Sultans of Swing: The Very Best of Dire Straits (1998)	Private Investigations (2005)

Professional ratings
Review scores
Source	Rating
AllMusic	4/5 stars

Sultans of Swing: The Very Best of Dire Straits is the second greatest hits compilation by the British rock band Dire Straits, released on 19 October 1998 by Mercury Records internationally, and by Warner Bros. Records in the United States. The album was originally released three years after the band's 1995 dissolution, and it featured liner notes by Robert Sandall, as both a single CD and a limited edition double CD, with the second CD containing live recordings from Mark Knopfler's first solo tour in 1996. A DVD of the same name was also released, featuring the music videos of all the songs on the single CD version, in addition to short interviews with Mark Knopfler about each song. The album is named after the band's 1978 hit single of the same name. In 2002, a limited edition box set, comprising the two CDs and the DVD, was released as part of Universal's "Sight and Sound" series.

== Track listing ==
All tracks are written by Mark Knopfler, except where noted.

Disc one
No.	Title	Original album	Length
1.	"Sultans of Swing"	Dire Straits, 1978	5:50
2.	"Lady Writer"	Communiqué, 1979	3:49
3.	"Romeo and Juliet"	Making Movies, 1980	6:05
4.	"Tunnel of Love" (containing an extract from Rodgers and Hammerstein's "Carousel Waltz")	Making Movies	8:14
5.	"Private Investigations" (edited version)	Love over Gold, 1982	5:54
6.	"Twisting by the Pool"	ExtendedancEPlay, 1983	3:36
7.	"Love over Gold" (live)	Alchemy: Dire Straits Live, 1984	3:40
8.	"So Far Away" (edited version)	Brothers in Arms, 1985	4:03
9.	"Money for Nothing" (radio edit; written by Knopfler and Sting)	Brothers in Arms	4:09
10.	"Brothers in Arms" (radio edit)	Brothers in Arms	4:55
11.	"Walk of Life"	Brothers in Arms	4:12
12.	"Calling Elvis" (edited version)	On Every Street, 1991	4:41
13.	"Heavy Fuel"	On Every Street	4:54
14.	"On Every Street" (edited version)	On Every Street	4:39
15.	"Your Latest Trick" (live)	On the Night, 1993	5:41
16.	"Local Hero/Wild Theme" (live)	Encores, 1993	4:23

Disc two

The following tracks were recorded live at the Royal Albert Hall on 23 May 1996 by Mark Knopfler.

1. "Calling Elvis" – 9:05
2. "Walk of Life" – 5:28
3. "Last Exit to Brooklyn" – 2:23
4. "Romeo and Juliet" – 7:30
5. "Sultans of Swing" – 13:14
6. "Brothers in Arms" – 8:54
7. "Money for Nothing" – 6:37

== Charts ==
=== Weekly charts ===
Chart (1998)	Peak position
Australian Albums (ARIA)	4
Austrian Albums (Ö3 Austria)	5
Belgian Albums (Ultratop Flanders)	3
Belgian Albums (Ultratop Wallonia)	6
Canadian Albums (RPM)	60
Danish Albums (Hitlisten)	6
Dutch Albums (Album Top 100)	6
European Albums Chart	3
Finnish Albums (Suomen virallinen lista)	1
French Compilations Chart	1
German Albums (Offizielle Top 100)	6
Hungarian Albums (MAHASZ)	10
Irish Albums (IRMA)	10
Italian Albums (FIMI)	44
New Zealand Albums (RMNZ)	6
Norwegian Albums (VG-lista)	2
Scottish Albums (OCC)	9
Spanish Albums (Promusicae)	44
Swedish Albums (Sverigetopplistan)	7
Swiss Albums (Schweizer Hitparade)	3
UK Albums (OCC)	6

=== Year-end charts ===
Chart (1998)	Position
Belgian Albums (Ultratop Flanders)	10
Belgian Albums (Ultratop Wallonia)	29
Dutch Albums (Album Top 100)	44
UK Albums (OCC)	54

Chart (1999)	Position
Australian Albums (ARIA)	59
Belgian Albums (Ultratop Flanders)	43
Belgian Albums (Ultratop Wallonia)	46
Dutch Albums (Album Top 100)	38

Chart (2004)	Position
UK Albums (OCC)	196

== Certifications ==
Region	Certification	Certified units/sales
Argentina (CAPIF)	Platinum	60,000^{^}
Australia (ARIA)	6× Platinum	420,000^{^}
Austria (IFPI Austria)	Gold	25,000^{*}
Belgium (BRMA)	Platinum	50,000^{*}
Finland (Musiikkituottajat)	Platinum	42,743
France (SNEP)	Platinum	300,000^{*}
Germany (BVMI)	Gold	250,000^{^}
Greece (IFPI Greece)	Gold	15,000^{^}
Hungary (MAHASZ)	Gold	
Italy (FIMI)	Gold	50,000^{*}
Netherlands (NVPI)	Gold	50,000^{^}
New Zealand (RMNZ)	Platinum	15,000^{^}
Norway (IFPI Norway)	Platinum	50,000^{*}
Spain (Promusicae)	2× Platinum	200,000^{^}
Sweden (GLF)	Platinum	80,000^{^}
Switzerland (IFPI Switzerland)	Platinum	50,000^{^}
United Kingdom (BPI)	3× Platinum	900,000^{‡}
Summaries
Europe (IFPI)	4× Platinum	4,000,000^{*}
^{*} Sales figures based on certification alone.^{^} Shipments figures based on certification alone.^{‡} Sales+streaming figures based on certification alone.
