= Private Investigations =

Private Investigations may refer to:

- Private investigations
- "Private Investigations" (song), a 1982 song by Dire Straits
- Private Investigations (album), a 2005 compilation album by Dire Straits and Mark Knopfler
