= Private Dancer (Tina Turner song) =

- U.S. vinyl release picture sleeve

Single by Tina Turner

from the album Private Dancer
- B-side: "Keep Your Hands Off My Baby"; "Nutbush City Limits" (live)
- Released: October 1984 (EU); November 5, 1984 (UK)
- Recorded: 1983
- Length: 7:11 (album version); 3:57 (single edit)
- Label: Capitol
- Songwriter: Mark Knopfler
- Producer: Carter

Tina Turner singles chronology
"Better Be Good to Me" (1984)	"Private Dancer" (1984)	"I Can't Stand the Rain" (1985)

Music video
- "Private Dancer" on YouTube

"Private Dancer" is a song written by British musician Mark Knopfler and recorded by singer Tina Turner, first released in October 1984. The song was intended to be for Knopfler’s band Dire Straits, but was never fully recorded or released by the band. He ended up giving the song to Turner, with her recording being produced by John Carter for her fifth solo album of the same name and released as the album's fifth single. In a fresh recording session, Dire Straits (minus Knopfler) backed Jeff Beck on lead guitar and Straits' touring saxophonist, Mel Collins. The track reached number seven on the US Billboard Hot 100 and number three on the US R&B chart. The song had moderate international success, reaching number 26 on the UK Singles Chart.

== Background ==
The song was initially intended for Dire Straits' 1982 album Love over Gold. The instruments were recorded, but Mark Knopfler considered the lyrics unsuitable for a male singer, so the track was dropped from the project. Legal restrictions prevented the original recording being used by Tina Turner, so two years later it was remade by members of Dire Straits (minus Knopfler). Terry Williams replaced the original drummer, Pick Withers. Lead guitar was performed by Jeff Beck.

About how she came to record the song, Tina Turner told DJ Roger Scott:

Roger [Tina Turner's manager] knows Knopfler's manager Ed Bicknell, and Bicknell said, 'I think Mark has a song that could fit Tina, that he never used because he thought it was a song for a girl.' Mark produced the song and sang it, and after he did it he felt that it was not a song for a man, so it was just sitting on the shelf… He gave me the track and I copied it with Dire Straits people – most of them. At first I was going to try to just put my voice on Mark's tapes, but there was a record company problem, so we got Mark's musicians, Dire Straits, and went into the studio... Someone said, 'Why did you select "Private Dancer"? It's a song about a hooker. Is it because you've been a hooker?' And I was shocked... I didn't see her as a hooker... I can be naive about some of these things. But actually the answer is no. I took it because it was an unusual song. I'd never sung a song like it. And I wish you could hear Mark's version of it. He's got a very English-sounding voice... and it was really quite beautiful.... A very arty song... so I put the old soulful touch on it.

Knopfler once said the song was ruined due to "them drafting in Jeff Beck to play the world's second-ugliest guitar solo".

The song shares the same tune as the song "Love over Gold" which had been recorded by Dire Straits two years previously and later released as a live single.

== Critical reception ==
The Daily Vault's Mark Millan wrote, "It's a sexy, dark track that gives the album an edge and also a chance for Turner's powerful sexuality to sparkle."

== Music video ==
The accompanying music video for "Private Dancer", featuring dance choreography by Arlene Phillips, was directed by Brian Grant and filmed at the Rivoli Ballroom in Crofton Park in London. It features Turner as a disillusioned taxi dancer, although the song has also been interpreted as being sung from the perspective of a prostitute. The video was later published on Turner's official YouTube channel in March 2009. It has amassed more than 40 million views as of June 2023.

== Personnel ==
- Tina Turner – vocals
- Jeff Beck – guitar solo
- John Illsley – bass guitar
- Alan Clark – keyboards
- Hal Lindes – guitar
- Terry Williams – drums
- Mel Collins – tenor saxophone
- Julian Diggle and Carter – percussion
- Norman Seeff – cover photography (US)
- Peter Ashworth – cover photography (UK)

== Versions and mixes ==
- 7-inch edit – 3:54
- Album version – 7:11
- The album version was remastered in 2015. The song remained the same length and is titled "Private Dancer – 2015 Remaster."

== Charts ==
=== Weekly charts ===
Chart (1984–1985)	Peak position
Australia (Kent Music Report)	21
Belgium (Ultratop 50 Flanders)	5
Canada Top Singles (RPM)	11
Europe (European Top 100)	12
Finland (Suomen virallinen lista)	11
Ireland (IRMA)	14
Netherlands (Dutch Top 40)	4
Netherlands (Single Top 100)	4
New Zealand (Recorded Music NZ)	5
Spain (PROMUSICAE)	6
UK Singles (Official Charts)	26
US Billboard Hot 100	7
US Adult Contemporary (Billboard)	30
US Hot R&B/Hip-Hop Songs (Billboard)	3
West Germany (Official German Charts)	20
US Cash Box Top 100	8

Chart (2023)	Peak position
Hungary (Single Top 40)	32

Chart (2026)	Peak position
Israel International Airplay (Media Forest)	14

=== Year-end charts ===
Chart (1984)	Position
Belgium (Ultratop 50 Flanders)	74
Netherlands (Single Top 100)	24

Chart (1985)	Position
US Billboard Hot 100	93
US Hot R&B/Hip-Hop Songs (Billboard)	39

== Certifications ==
Region	Certification	Certified units/sales
United Kingdom 1984 release	—	250,000
United Kingdom (BPI) 2004 release	Silver	200,000^{‡}
^{‡} Sales+streaming figures based on certification alone.

== Cover versions ==
American singer-songwriter, rapper, and bassist Meshell Ndegeocello recorded a cover version of the song for her album Ventriloquism, released on March 16, 2018.

In 2015, Canadian electronic musician and performance artist Peaches performed a piano version of the song on The Strombo Show at the home of George Stroumboulopoulos. Peaches had previously played the song live at different concerts.
