= Private Investigations (album) =

Compilation album by Dire Straits and Mark Knopfler
- Released: 11 November 2005
- Genre: Roots rock
- Length: 77:12 (CD); 135:52 (2CD); 137:57 (2CD-U.S.A.)
- Labels: Mercury; Vertigo; Warner Bros. (US)

Dire Straits chronology
Sultans of Swing: The Very Best of Dire Straits (1998)	Private Investigations (2005)	The Honky Tonk Demos (2015)

Mark Knopfler chronology
One Take Radio Sessions (2005)	Private Investigations (2005)	All the Roadrunning (2006)

Private Investigations: The Best of Dire Straits & Mark Knopfler is the third compilation album by Dire Straits, released in 2005 by Mercury and Vertigo internationally, and Warner Bros. in the United States. Named after their 1982 hit single, the album consists of material by Dire Straits, with songs selected from the group's six studio albums (excluding the 1979 album Communiqué) from 1978 up through the group's dissolution in 1995. It also features work from the solo career of the group's singer, songwriter, and guitarist Mark Knopfler, including some of his soundtrack material.

The only previously unreleased track on the album is "All the Roadrunning", a duet with country music singer Emmylou Harris. It was released as a single, reaching #8 in the UK. The United States version omits "Darling Pretty", but adds "Skateaway".

== Release ==
Private Investigations was released in four different versions:

- A single disc (grey cover)
- A two-disc compilation (blue cover)
- A two-disc compilation with a booklet (gold cover)
- A two-disc LP with tracks from the single disc CD version

== Critical reception ==
Professional ratings
Review scores
Source	Rating
AllMusic	4/5 stars

In his review for AllMusic, Thom Jurek gave the album four out of five stars and praised the 2CD release, describing a 1CD version as "a silly thing at best and a hopelessly frustrating one at worst." He concluded that "this is not only a fine collection for fans because of its wonderful sequencing, but the best introduction to the man and the band that one could ask for."

== Track listing ==
All songs were written by Mark Knopfler, except where indicated.

=== Single disc version ===
No.	Title	Artist; original album	Length
1.	"Sultans of Swing"	Dire Straits; Dire Straits, 1978	5:48
2.	"Love over Gold"	Dire Straits; Love over Gold, 1982	6:16
3.	"Romeo and Juliet"	Dire Straits; Making Movies, 1980	6:00
4.	"Tunnel of Love" (Extract from "The Carousel Waltz" by Richard Rodgers and Oscar Hammerstein II)	Dire Straits; Making Movies	8:10
5.	"Private Investigations" (Edit)	Dire Straits; Love over Gold	5:57
6.	"Money for Nothing" (Single edit, featuring Sting; Knopfler, Gordon Sumner)	Dire Straits; Brothers in Arms, 1985	4:04
7.	"Brothers in Arms"	Dire Straits; Brothers in Arms	6:57
8.	"Walk of Life"	Dire Straits; Brothers in Arms	4:08
9.	"On Every Street"	Dire Straits; On Every Street, 1991	5:03
10.	"Going Home (Theme from Local Hero)"	Mark Knopfler; Local Hero soundtrack, 1983	5:00
11.	"Why Aye Man" (Radio Edit) (featuring Jimmy Nail & Tim Healy)	Mark Knopfler; The Ragpicker's Dream, 2002	4:09
12.	"Boom, Like That"	Mark Knopfler; Shangri-La, 2004	5:49
13.	"What It Is"	Mark Knopfler; Sailing to Philadelphia, 2000	4:56
14.	"All the Roadrunning" (featuring Emmylou Harris)	Mark Knopfler; All the Roadrunning, 2006	4:49
Total length:			77:13

=== Two-disc version ===
Disc one

No.	Title	Artist; original album	Length
1.	"Telegraph Road"	Dire Straits; Love over Gold	14:20
2.	"Sultans of Swing"	Dire Straits; Dire Straits	5:48
3.	"Love over Gold"	Dire Straits; Love Over Gold	6:16
4.	"Romeo and Juliet"	Dire Straits; Making Movies	6:00
5.	"Tunnel of Love" (Extract from "The Carousel Waltz" by Rodgers and Hammerstein)	Dire Straits; Making Movies	8:10
6.	"Private Investigations" (Edit)	Dire Straits; Love over Gold	5:57
7.	"So Far Away"	Dire Straits; Brothers in Arms	5:07
8.	"Money for Nothing" (featuring Sting)	Dire Straits; Brothers in Arms	8:24
9.	"Brothers in Arms"	Dire Straits; Brothers in Arms	6:57
10.	"Walk of Life"	Dire Straits; Brothers in Arms	4:08
11.	"Your Latest Trick"	Dire Straits; Brothers in Arms	6:29

Disc two

No.	Title	Artist; original album	Length
1.	"Calling Elvis"	Dire Straits; On Every Street	6:24
2.	"On Every Street"	Dire Straits; On Every Street	5:03
3.	"Going Home (Theme from Local Hero)"	Mark Knopfler; Local Hero soundtrack	5:00
4.	"Darling Pretty"	Mark Knopfler; Golden Heart	4:43
5.	"The Long Road (Theme from Cal)"	Mark Knopfler; Cal soundtrack	7:17
6.	"Why Aye Man" (Radio Edit) (featuring Jimmy Nail & Tim Healy)	Mark Knopfler; The Ragpicker's Dream	4:09
7.	"Sailing to Philadelphia" (Extended Album Version) (featuring James Taylor)	Mark Knopfler; Sailing to Philadelphia	5:53
8.	"What It Is"	Mark Knopfler; Sailing to Philadelphia	4:56
9.	"The Trawlerman's Song"	Mark Knopfler; Shangri-La	5:02
10.	"Boom, Like That"	Mark Knopfler; Shangri-La	5:49
11.	"All the Roadrunning" (featuring Emmylou Harris)	Mark Knopfler; All the Roadrunning	4:49
Total length:			135:52

=== Two-disc American version ===
Disc one

No.	Title	Artist; original album	Length
1.	"Telegraph Road"	Dire Straits; Love Over Gold	14:20
2.	"Sultans of Swing"	Dire Straits; Dire Straits	5:48
3.	"Love Over Gold"	Dire Straits; Love Over Gold	6:18
4.	"Romeo and Juliet"	Dire Straits; Making Movies	6:00
5.	"Tunnel of Love" (Extract from "The Carousel Waltz" by Rodgers and Hammerstein)	Dire Straits; Making Movies	8:10
6.	"Skateaway"	Dire Straits; Making Movies	6:35
7.	"Private Investigations" (Edit)	Dire Straits; Love over Gold	5:59
8.	"So Far Away"	Dire Straits; Brothers in Arms	5:07
9.	"Money for Nothing" (featuring Sting)	Dire Straits; Brothers in Arms	8:24
10.	"Walk of Life"	Dire Straits; Brothers in Arms	4:08
11.	"Your Latest Trick"	Dire Straits; Brothers in Arms	6:29

Disc two

No.	Title	Artist; original album	Length
1.	"Calling Elvis"	Dire Straits; On Every Street	6:24
2.	"On Every Street"	Dire Straits; On Every Street	5:03
3.	"Going Home (Theme from Local Hero)"	Mark Knopfler; Local Hero soundtrack	5:00
4.	"The Long Road (Theme from Cal)"	Mark Knopfler; Cal soundtrack	7:21
5.	"Why Aye Man" (Radio Edit) (featuring Jimmy Nail & Tim Healy)	Mark Knopfler; The Ragpicker's Dream	4:09
6.	"Sailing to Philadelphia" (Extended Album Version) (featuring James Taylor)	Mark Knopfler; Sailing to Philadelphia	5:53
7.	"What It Is"	Mark Knopfler; Sailing to Philadelphia	4:56
8.	"The Trawlerman's Song"	Mark Knopfler; Shangri-La	5:02
9.	"Boom, Like That"	Mark Knopfler; Shangri-La	5:49
10.	"Brothers in Arms"	Dire Straits; Brothers in Arms	6:57
11.	"All the Roadrunning" (featuring Emmylou Harris)	Mark Knopfler; All the Roadrunning	4:49
Total length:			137:57

== Charts ==
=== Weekly charts ===
Chart (2005)	Peak position
Australian Albums (ARIA)	35
Austrian Albums (Ö3 Austria)	44
Belgian Albums (Ultratop Flanders)	14
Belgian Albums (Ultratop Wallonia)	32
Danish Albums (Hitlisten)	5
Dutch Albums (Album Top 100)	23
Finnish Albums (Suomen virallinen lista)	17
French Compilations Chart	4
German Albums (Offizielle Top 100)	36
Greek Albums (IFPI)	8
Irish Albums (IRMA)	10
Italian Albums (FIMI)	21
New Zealand Albums (RMNZ)	17
Norwegian Albums (VG-lista)	5
Portuguese Albums (AFP)	3
Scottish Albums (Official Charts)	20
Spanish Albums (Promusicae)	7
Swiss Albums (Schweizer Hitparade)	15
UK Albums (Official Charts)	20

Chart (2010)	Peak position
Swedish Albums (Sverigetopplistan)	3

Chart (2016)	Peak position
French Albums (SNEP)	134
Polish Albums (ZPAV)	4

Chart (2026)	Peak position
Greek Albums (IFPI)	1

=== Year-end charts ===
Chart (2005)	Position
Belgian Albums (Ultratop Flanders)	94
Swedish Albums (Sverigetopplistan)	42
UK Albums (OCC)	87

Chart (2010)	Position
Swedish Albums (Sverigetopplistan)	56
UK Albums (OCC)	173

Chart (2011)	Position
UK Albums (OCC)	159

Chart (2012)	Position
UK Albums (OCC)	181

Chart (2013)	Position
UK Albums (OCC)	200

Chart (2016)	Position
Polish Albums (ZPAV)	81

Chart (2019)	Position
Belgian Albums (Ultratop Flanders)	140

Chart (2025)	Position
UK Albums (OCC)	97

== Certifications ==
Region	Certification	Certified units/sales
Australia (ARIA)	Platinum	70,000^{^}
Belgium (BRMA)	Platinum	50,000^{*}
Denmark (IFPI Danmark)	Platinum	40,000^{^}
Germany (BVMI)	Platinum	200,000^{‡}
Ireland (IRMA)	2× Platinum	30,000^{^}
Italy (FIMI)	Platinum	50,000^{*}
New Zealand (RMNZ)	Platinum	15,000^{^}
Poland (ZPAV)	Platinum	20,000^{‡}
Portugal (AFP)	Platinum	20,000^{^}
Spain (Promusicae)	Platinum	80,000^{^}
Sweden (GLF)	Gold	30,000^{^}
United Kingdom (BPI)	5× Platinum	1,500,000^{‡}
Summaries
Europe (IFPI)	Platinum	1,000,000^{*}
^{*} Sales figures based on certification alone.^{^} Shipments figures based on certification alone.^{‡} Sales+streaming figures based on certification alone.
