= Screenplaying =

Compilation album by Mark Knopfler
- Released: 9 November 1993
- Recorded: 1982–1989
- Genre: Film music
- Length: 71:16
- Label: Vertigo; Warner Bros. (USA)
- Producer: Mark Knopfler

Mark Knopfler chronology
| Neck and Neck (1990) | Screenplaying (1993) | Golden Heart (1996) |

Screenplaying is a compilation album by British singer-songwriter and guitarist Mark Knopfler, released on 9 November 1993 by Vertigo Records internationally and Warner Bros. Records in the United States. The album contains previously released tracks from Knopfler's soundtrack albums Cal (1984), Last Exit to Brooklyn (1989), The Princess Bride (1987), and Local Hero (1983).

== Critical reception ==
Professional ratings
Review scores
| Source | Rating |
|---|---|
| AllMusic | 4.5/5 stars |

In his review for AllMusic, William Ruhlmann gave the album four and a half out of five stars, writing, "The music is reminiscent of the calmer parts of Dire Straits songs: melodic, lyrical, and touching."

== Track listing ==
All music was written by Mark Knopfler, except where indicated.

| No. | Title | Writer(s) | Length |
|---|---|---|---|
| 1. | "Irish Boy" (Cal) | | 4:38 |
| 2. | "Irish Love" (Cal) | | 2:26 |
| 3. | "Father and Son" (Cal) | | 3:27 |
| 4. | "Potato Picking" (Cal) | | 2:06 |
| 5. | "The Long Road" (Cal) | | 7:20 |
| 6. | "A Love Idea" (Last Exit to Brooklyn) | | 3:06 |
| 7. | "Victims" (Last Exit to Brooklyn) | | 3:33 |
| 8. | "Finale – Last Exit to Brooklyn" (Last Exit to Brooklyn) | | 6:22 |
| 9. | "Once Upon a Time...Storybook Love" (The Princess Bride) | | 3:58 |
| 10. | "Morning Ride" (The Princess Bride) | | 1:34 |
| 11. | "The Friends' Song" (The Princess Bride) | | 3:01 |
| 12. | "Guide My Sword" (The Princess Bride) | | 5:09 |
| 13. | "A Happy Ending" (The Princess Bride) | | 1:51 |
| 14. | "Wild Theme" (Local Hero) | | 3:39 |
| 15. | "Boomtown" (Local Hero) | | 4:08 |
| 16. | "The Mist Covered Mountains" (Local Hero) | Traditional, arrangement by Mark Knopfler | 4:59 |
| 17. | "Smooching" (Local Hero) | | 5:00 |
| 18. | "Going Home: Theme of the Local Hero" (Local Hero) | | 4:59 |
| Total length: | | | 71:16 |

== Charts ==
| Chart (1993) | Peak position |
|---|---|
| Hungarian Albums (MAHASZ) | 21 |
| Netherlands Albums Chart | 21 |
| New Zealand Albums Chart | 21 |

== Certifications ==
| Region | Certification | Certified units/sales |
|---|---|---|
| New Zealand (RMNZ) | Gold | 7,500^{^} |
| Spain (PROMUSICAE) | Platinum | 100,000^{^} |
^{^} Shipments figures based on certification alone.
