= Staz Lindes =

English-American model and musician (born 1992)

- Born: Nastassia Sahara Elizabeth Lindes; 26 March 1992 (age 34); London, England
- Occupations: Fashion model; musician
- Parent: Hal Lindes
- Modeling information
- Height: 1.73 m (5 ft 8 in)
- Hair color: Blonde
- Eye color: Blue
- Agency: The Society Management (New York); Elite Model Management (Paris, London, Barcelona); Why Not Model Management (Milan); Scoop Models (Copenhagen); Priscilla's Model Management (Sydney); Freedom (Miami, Los Angeles) (mother agency)

Nastassia Sahara Elizabeth Lindes (born 26 March 1992) is an English-American fashion model and musician. She has been the face of YSL Beauty. As a musician, she plays bass in the Los Angeles riot grrrl-style garage rock band The Paranoyds.

== Early life ==
Lindes was born in Westminster, London, England to American rock musician Hal Lindes and English model Mary Lovett. They moved to Los Angeles, California in 1998. She has an older brother named Misha, who is a musician, and younger sister named Evangeline, who is an actress. As a child, she learned to play the guitar, bass, flute and cello.

== Career ==
As a model, Lindes was discovered at a bowling alley in Santa Monica, California after multiple scouts sought after her. She modeled for H&M, Vogue Japan, ASOS, Cosmopolitan, Jeremy Scott and Moschino, Seventeen, i-D, and appeared on the cover of Russh magazine.

After seeing her perform with her band The Paranoyds, fashion designer Hedi Slimane cast her for an Yves Saint Laurent show and campaign. She has appeared in ads for Rag & Bone, Forever 21, Mango, and Dior; she's appeared in editorials for American and Russian Vogue, W, and Harper's Bazaar. She has also walked the runway for Sonia Rykiel.
