= Money for Nothing (album) =

Greatest hits album by Dire Straits
- Released: 17 October 1988
- Recorded: 1978–1985
- Genre: Rock
- Length: 66:18
- Label: Vertigo; Warner Bros. (US)
- Producer: Various

Dire Straits chronology
Brothers in Arms (1985)	Money for Nothing (1988)	On Every Street (1991)

Professional ratings
Review scores
Source	Rating
AllMusic	4/5 stars
Robert Christgau	B−
Number One	1.5/5 stars

Money for Nothing is a greatest hits album by British rock band Dire Straits released on 17 October 1988, featuring highlights from the band's first five albums. The vinyl edition omits the song "Telegraph Road" and has a different running order.

== Details ==
The first track on the album, "Sultans of Swing", which was the group's first hit single, was re-released as a single in the UK in November 1988 to promote the album.

The album was remastered and reissued with the rest of the Dire Straits catalogue in 1996 for most of the world outside the United States, before being deleted in 1998 and replaced by another compilation, Sultans of Swing: The Very Best of Dire Straits.

The cover art is a screenshot taken from the "Money for Nothing" music video. The version of the song included on the album omits the controversial Verse 2 lyrics entirely.

A newly-remastered version of the compilation was issued in the UK to streaming platforms and on vinyl on 17 June 2022. This reissued vinyl includes the live version of "Telegraph Road" omitted from the original vinyl release. The version issued to streaming services originally included an alternate version of "Sultans of Swing" used for release as a single in 1978, before being replaced with the album version.

== Track listing ==
All songs written by Mark Knopfler, except the intro to "Tunnel of Love" (extract from "The Carousel Waltz" by Rodgers & Hammerstein) and "Money for Nothing" by Mark Knopfler and Sting.

Original 1988 CD release
No.	Title	Original release	Length
1.	"Sultans of Swing"	Dire Straits, 1978	5:46
2.	"Down to the Waterline"	Dire Straits	4:01
3.	"Portobello Belle" (live)	Previously unreleased outtake from Alchemy: Dire Straits Live, 1984	4:33
4.	"Twisting by the Pool" (remix)	Previously unreleased remix; original mix on ExtendeDancEPlay, 1983	3:30
5.	"Tunnel of Love"	Making Movies, 1980	8:10
6.	"Romeo and Juliet"	Making Movies	5:56
7.	"Solid Rock" (Japanese release only)	Making Movies	3:19
8.	"Where Do You Think You're Going?" (alternative mix)	Previously unreleased mix; original mix on Communiqué, 1979	3:30
9.	"Walk of Life"	Brothers in Arms, 1985	4:08
10.	"Private Investigations" (single edit)	Love over Gold, 1982	5:50
11.	"Telegraph Road" (live; remix)	Alchemy: Dire Straits Live	11:59
12.	"Money for Nothing" (radio edit)	Brothers in Arms	4:06
13.	"Brothers in Arms" (radio edit)	Brothers in Arms	4:49

Original 1988 vinyl release

Side 1
No.	Title	Length
1.	"Sultans of Swing"
2.	"Down to the Waterline"
3.	"Portobello Belle" (live)
4.	"Twisting by the Pool" (remix)
5.	"Romeo and Juliet"
6.	"Where Do You Think You're Going?"

Side 2
No.	Title	Length
7.	"Walk of Life"
8.	"Private Investigations"
9.	"Money for Nothing"
10.	"Tunnel of Love"
11.	"Brothers in Arms"

Remastered 2022 release

- Released on 17 June 2022
- Available on vinyl and digital download only
- The tracks, versions and song order are the same as the original 1988 CD International and American releases
- Released as a double LP

Side 1
No.	Title	Length
1.	"Sultans of Swing"	5:48
2.	"Down to the Waterline"	4:01
3.	"Portobello Belle" (live; alternative outtake)	4:23

Side 2
No.	Title	Length
4.	"Twisting by the Pool" (remix)	3:33
5.	"Tunnel of Love"	8:12
6.	"Romeo and Juliet"	5:59

Side 3
No.	Title	Length
7.	"Where Do You Think You're Going?" (alternative mix)	3:33
8.	"Walk of Life"	4:06
9.	"Private Investigations"	5:56

Side 4
No.	Title	Length
10.	"Telegraph Road" (live; remix)	12:00
11.	"Money for Nothing" (radio edit)	4:08
12.	"Brothers in Arms" (radio edit)	4:58

== Charts ==
=== Weekly charts ===
Weekly chart performance for Money for Nothing
Chart (1988–1991)	Peak position
Australian Albums (ARIA)	3
Austrian Albums (Ö3 Austria)	3
Dutch Albums (Album Top 100)	1
German Albums (Offizielle Top 100)	2
Hungarian Albums (MAHASZ)	36
Italian Albums (Musica e dischi)	2
New Zealand Albums (RMNZ)	2
Norwegian Albums (VG-lista)	3
Swedish Albums (Sverigetopplistan)	8
Swiss Albums (Schweizer Hitparade)	1
UK Albums (Official Charts)	1
US Billboard 200	62

2022 weekly chart performance for Money for Nothing
Chart (2022)	Peak position
Belgian Albums (Ultratop Wallonia)	84

=== Year-end charts ===
Year-end chart performance for Money for Nothing
Chart (1989)	Position
Austrian Albums (Ö3 Austria)	28
Dutch Albums (Album Top 100)	6
German Albums (Offizielle Top 100)	18
New Zealand Albums (RMNZ)	36
Swiss Albums (Schweizer Hitparade)	11
Chart (1990)	Position
Dutch Albums (Album Top 100)	43
Chart (1991)	Position
Dutch Albums (Album Top 100)	25
Chart (1992)	Position
Dutch Albums (Album Top 100)	66

== Certifications and sales ==
Certifications and sales for Money for Nothing
Region	Certification	Certified units/sales
Australia (ARIA)	3× Platinum	210,000^{^}
Brazil (Pro-Música Brasil)	Platinum	400,000
Canada (Music Canada)	Platinum	100,000^{^}
Finland (Musiikkituottajat)	Gold	77,842
France (SNEP)	Diamond	1,000,000^{*}
Germany (BVMI)	Platinum	500,000^{^}
Hong Kong (IFPI Hong Kong)	Platinum	20,000^{*}
Italy sales 1988-1989	—	500,000
Malaysia	—	4,000
Netherlands (NVPI)	2× Platinum	318,563
New Zealand (RMNZ)	Platinum	15,000^{^}
Portugal (AFP)	Gold	20,000^{^}
Singapore	—	10,000
Spain (Promusicae)	2× Platinum	200,000^{^}
Switzerland (IFPI Switzerland)	3× Platinum	150,000^{^}
United Kingdom (BPI)	4× Platinum	1,200,000^{^}
United States (RIAA)	Platinum	1,000,000^{^}
^{*} Sales figures based on certification alone.^{^} Shipments figures based on certification alone.
