= Bermuda Grace =

1994 American television film directed by Mark Sobel

- Written by: William Davies; William Osborne
- Directed by: Mark Sobel
- Starring: William Sadler; Serena Scott Thomas; David Harewood; Leslie Phillips
- Music by: Hal Lindes
- Country of origin: United States

Production
- Cinematography: Terry Cole
- Editor: Allan Lee
- Running time: 96 minutes
- Production company: NBC Productions

Original release
- Network: NBC
- Release: January 7, 1994

Bermuda Grace is a 1994 American television film directed by Mark Sobel. A comedy thriller, it stars William Sadler and David Harewood. This buddy cop comedy was also considered a backdoor pilot for potential series, however the high production cost of an ongoing series in Bermuda made that impossible. It also featured Serena Scott Thomas, Andrew Jackson, Leslie Phillips and Cliff Parisi. The film was written and produced by William Davies and William Osborne, writers of the feature film Twins.

== Plot ==
A Philadelphia policeman and a British policeman jointly hunt a jewel thief to the Atlantic island of Bermuda.

== Production ==
The film was shot on location in Bermuda.

== Reception ==
The film was found "short on suspense, originality and zip" by Variety, but a Bermuda travel guide calls it ”a charming ode to modern-day Bermuda and its people. "
