= Alchemy: Dire Straits Live =

1984 live album by Dire Straits

Live album by Dire Straits
- Released: 16 March 1984
- Recorded: 22–23 July 1983
- Venues: Hammersmith Odeon, London
- Genres: Rock; roots rock; blues rock; jazz rock
- Length: 93:59 (CD); 88:50 (LP); 107:11 (2023 re-release)
- Labels: Vertigo; Warner Bros. (US)
- Producer: Mark Knopfler

Dire Straits chronology
ExtendedancEPlay (1983)	Alchemy: Dire Straits Live (1984)	Brothers in Arms (1985)

Singles from Alchemy: Dire Straits Live
- 1. "Love over Gold" Released: 10 February 1984

Professional ratings
Review scores
Source	Rating
AllMusic	3/5 stars

Alchemy: Dire Straits Live is the first live album by the British rock band Dire Straits, released on 16 March 1984 by Vertigo Records internationally, and by Warner Bros. Records in the United States. Recorded at the Hammersmith Odeon in London on 22–23 July 1983, the double album features songs from the band's first four albums (Dire Straits, Communiqué, Making Movies and Love Over Gold), the ExtendedancEPlay EP and Mark Knopfler's Local Hero soundtrack. Many of the songs have reworked arrangements and extended instrumental segments. The album cover is taken from a painting by Brett Whiteley.

Alchemy: Dire Straits Live was remastered and reissued with the rest of the Dire Straits catalogue in 1996 for most of the world outside the United States and was remastered and re-released in the USA on 8 May 2001.

In November 2023, Alchemy was included in the box set anthology, Live 1978-1992.

== Recording ==
Alchemy: Dire Straits Live was recorded live at the Hammersmith Odeon in London on 22–23 July 1983, the final two concerts of Dire Straits' eight-month Love Over Gold Tour promoting their album Love Over Gold. The concerts were recorded by Mick McKenna using the Rolling Stones Mobile unit. The recording was mixed at AIR Studios in London in November 1983 where Nigel Walker was the engineer.

The opening track, "Once Upon a Time in the West" is preceded by an uncredited version of the "Stargazer" instrumental from the Local Hero soundtrack. "Tunnel of Love" is preceded by an otherwise unrecorded instrumental (actually faded in from the extended coda of "Portobello Belle", which was left off the original album), already played on the 1981 tour, but here re-arranged to showcase Mel Collins' saxophone. It is followed by the brief "Carousel Waltz" intro and standard version of the song.

== Cover artwork ==
The album cover artwork was adapted from a section of a painting by Brett Whiteley titled Alchemy 1974. Alchemy is a hypothetical process once believed to turn ordinary elements into gold. The image of a guitar with lips held by a hand was added for the album design and covers sexually suggestive imagery in the original. The original painting, done between 1972 and 1973, was composed of many different elements and on 18 wood panels 203 cm x 1615 cm x 9 cm. In terms of media it used everything from feathers and part of a bird's nest to a glass eye, shell, plugs and brain in a work that becomes a transmutation of sexual organic landscapes and mindscapes.

== Critical reception ==
Reviewing retrospectively for AllMusic, critic William Ruhlmann wrote of the album "There is an interesting contrast .... between the music, much of which is slow and moody, with Mark Knopfler's muttered vocals and large helpings of his fingerpicking on what sounds like an amplified Spanish guitar, and the audience response. The arena-size crowd cheers wildly, and claps and sings along when given half a chance, as though each song were an up-tempo rocker." Ruhlmann concludes, "The CD version of the album contains one extra track, "Love Over Gold," which adds a needed change of pace to the otherwise slow-moving first disc."

== Track listing ==
All songs were written by Mark Knopfler, except where indicated.

=== LP ===
Side one

No.	Title	Length
1.	"Once Upon a Time in the West"	13:01
2.	"Romeo and Juliet"	8:22

Side two

No.	Title	Length
1.	"Expresso Love"	5:41
2.	"Private Investigations"	7:40
3.	"Sultans of Swing"	10:48

Side three

No.	Title	Length
1.	"Two Young Lovers"	4:51
2.	"Tunnel of Love" (Extract from "The Carousel Waltz" by Richard Rodgers and Oscar Hammerstein II)	14:38

Side four

No.	Title	Length
1.	"Telegraph Road"	13:19
2.	"Solid Rock"	5:32
3.	"Going Home: Theme of the Local Hero"	4:58

=== CD ===
"Love over Gold", which had been released as a separate single in 1984, was added into the track list for the CD release, and the fade outs between sides 1 and 2 and sides 3 and 4 have been removed. A number of tracks had their length increased for the CD releases (the closing number, "Going Home", by the addition of another intro from Local Hero, namely "The Rocks and the Thunder"), and the track order is slightly different: "Romeo and Juliet" and "Expresso Love" are in reversed order.

Disc one

No.	Title	Length
1.	"Once Upon a Time in the West"	13:01
2.	"Expresso Love"	5:45
3.	"Romeo and Juliet"	8:17
4.	"Love over Gold"	3:27
5.	"Private Investigations"	7:34
6.	"Sultans of Swing"	10:54

Disc two

No.	Title	Length
1.	"Two Young Lovers"	4:49
2.	"Tunnel of Love" (Extract from "The Carousel Waltz" by Richard Rodgers and Oscar Hammerstein II)	14:29
3.	"Telegraph Road"	13:37
4.	"Solid Rock"	6:01
5.	"Going Home – Theme from 'Local Hero'"	6:05

=== Outtakes ===
Three more songs were recorded live but not included on the official album release: "Industrial Disease," "Twisting by the Pool" and “Portobello Belle”.

An edited version of "Portobello Belle" (length: 4:33) and a remixed version of "Telegraph Road" were included on the CD version of the compilation Money for Nothing, released in 1988 (Money for Nothing was re-mastered in 1996 as part of the "Dire Straits Re-Mastered" series and was re-released in June 2022).

The three missing songs were newly mixed and inserted into the Alchemy running order for the box set Live 1978-1992 which was released in November 2023 (the other songs were remastered from the original mix), however this version of the album omits the "Rocks and the Thunder" intro to "Going Home" like the original LP did, and swaps the order of "Telegraph Road" and "Solid Rock". Also, "Portobello Belle" (7:22) has the full intro, but a shortened outro.

== Live 1978-1992 box set track listing ==
In November 2023, the album was re-released as a triple LP and double CD in the new box set Live 1978-1992, newly remastered by Andy Walter. On both the vinyl LP and the CD, "Telegraph Road" and "Solid Rock" are in reverse order from the original album.

=== LP ===
Side one

No.	Title	Length
1.	"Once Upon a Time in the West"	12:48
2.	"Industrial Disease"	5:52

Side two

No.	Title	Length
1.	"Expresso Love"	5:12
2.	"Romeo and Juliet"	8:11
3.	"Love Over Gold"	3:27

Side three

No.	Title	Length
1.	"Private Investigations"	7:33
2.	"Sultans of Swing"	10:55
3.	"Twisting by the Pool"	3:42

Side four

No.	Title	Length
1.	"Two Young Lovers"	4:43
2.	"Portobello Belle"	7:22

Side five

No.	Title	Length
1.	"Tunnel of Love" (Extract from "The Carousel Waltz" by Richard Rodgers and Oscar Hammerstein II)	13:55
2.	"Solid Rock"	5:35

Side six

No.	Title	Length
1.	"Telegraph Road"	12:56
2.	"Going Home – Theme from 'Local Hero'"	5:06

=== CD ===
Disc one

No.	Title	Length
1.	"Once Upon a Time in the West"	12:48
2.	"Industrial Disease"	5:52
3.	"Expresso Love"	5:12
4.	"Romeo and Juliet"	8:11
5.	"Love over Gold"	3:27
6.	"Private Investigations"	7:33
7.	"Sultans of Swing"	10:55

Disc two

No.	Title	Length
1.	"Twisting by the Pool"	3:42
2.	"Two Young Lovers"	4:43
3.	"Portobello Belle"	7:22
4.	"Tunnel of Love" (Extract from "The Carousel Waltz" by Richard Rodgers and Oscar Hammerstein II)	13:55
5.	"Solid Rock"	5:35
6.	"Telegraph Road"	12:56
7.	"Going Home – Theme from 'Local Hero'"	5:06

== Personnel ==
Dire Straits

- Mark Knopfler – guitar, vocals
- Alan Clark – keyboards
- John Illsley – bass guitar, backing vocals
- Hal Lindes – guitar, backing vocals
- Terry Williams – drums

Additional musicians

- Mel Collins – saxophone
- Tommy Mandel – keyboards
- Joop de Korte – percussion

Production

- Mark Knopfler – producer
- Mick McKenna – recording engineer
- Nigel Walker – engineer
- Jeremy Allom – assistant engineer
- Brett Whiteley – artwork (adapted from Alchemy 1974)
- C More Tone Studios – design

== Video release ==
Alchemy: Dire Straits Live

Video by Dire Straits
- Released: 1984 (VHS), 1995 (VHS remastered), 2010 (DVD, Blu-ray)
- Recorded: 22–23 July 1983
- Venue: Hammersmith Odeon (London)
- Genres: Roots rock, blues rock, progressive rock
- Length: 90:00
- Label: PolyGram Video
- Producer: Mark Knopfler

Professional ratings
Review scores
Source	Rating
Allmusic	4/5 stars

The concert film was originally released in Beta, VHS video cassette and Laserdisc formats, and digitally remastered in 1995. 2010 saw new DVD and Blu-ray Disc releases of the concert with surround sound mixes prepared by Chuck Ainlay and the original video footage digitally enhanced and cleaned by Dick Carruthers. The song "Love over Gold" is not included in the video, just like the original album, but is available on the compilation Sultans of Swing: The Very Best of Dire Straits. It includes a mix of the live band footage with circus spectacle scenes. The 2010 Blu-ray release also included the BBC Arena documentary about Dire Straits aired in 1980.

The Alchemy video opens with scenes of the band in a pub playing pool, interspersed with concert clips. Playing over this is the song "Saturday Night at the Movies" performed by The Drifters. The music changes to the instrumental "Stargazer", from the film Local Hero, over external shots of a sold-out Hammersmith Odeon. The scene switches to the inside of the venue as Dire Straits are announced and walk onstage for the concert. The closing credits again use the Drifters' "Saturday Night at the Movies".

- A Limelight Films Production
- Director – Peter Sinclair
- Film Editor – Peter Goddard
- Soundtrack produced by Mark Knopfler
- Recorded by Mick McKenna, Rolling Stones Mobile

== Charts ==
=== Album ===
Chart (1984)	Peak position
Australian Albums (Kent Music Report)	3
Austrian Albums Chart	9
Canadian RPM Albums Chart	26
Dutch Charts Chart	1
European Albums (European Top 100 Albums)	3
German Albums Chart	8
New Zealand Albums Chart	3
Norwegian Albums Chart	7
Spanish Albums Chart	6
Swedish Albums Chart	19
Swiss Albums Chart	3
UK Albums Chart	3
US Billboard 200	46

=== Video ===
Chart (2010)	Peak position
Australian Music DVDs Chart	1
Austrian Music DVDs Chart	5
Belgian (Flanders) Music DVDs Chart	2
Belgian (Wallonia) Music DVDs Chart	3
Danish Music DVDs Chart	3
Dutch Music DVDs Chart	5
Finnish Music DVDs Chart	7
New Zealand Music DVDs Chart	2
UK Music Videos Chart	2

== Certifications ==
=== Album ===
Region	Certification	Certified units/sales
Australia (ARIA)	Gold	35,000^{^}
Brazil (Pro-Música Brasil)	Platinum	250,000^{*}
Canada (Music Canada)	Gold	50,000^{^}
France (SNEP)	Gold	100,000^{*}
Germany (BVMI)	Gold	250,000^{^}
Netherlands (NVPI)	Platinum	178,231
New Zealand (RMNZ)	Platinum	15,000^{^}
Spain (Promusicae)	Gold	50,000^{^}
United Kingdom (BPI)	Platinum	300,000^{^}
United States (RIAA)	Gold	250,000^{^}
^{*} Sales figures based on certification alone.^{^} Shipments figures based on certification alone.

=== Video ===
Region	Certification	Certified units/sales
Australia (ARIA)	Gold	7,500^{^}
Brazil (Pro-Música Brasil)	Gold	15,000^{*}
France (SNEP)	Gold	5,000^{*}
Portugal (AFP)	Gold	4,000^{^}
United Kingdom (BPI)	Gold	25,000^{*}
^{*} Sales figures based on certification alone.^{^} Shipments figures based on certification alone.
