= Walk of Life =

Single by Dire Straits

from the album Brothers in Arms
- B-side: "One World"; "Two Young Lovers" (live); "Sultans of Swing" (live)
- Released: 14 October 1985 (US); 3 January 1986 (UK)
- Studio: AIR (Salem, Montserrat)
- Genre: Pop rock; rock and roll; heartland rock; zydeco
- Length: 4:12
- Label: Vertigo
- Songwriter: Mark Knopfler
- Producers: Neil Dorfsman; Mark Knopfler

Dire Straits singles chronology
"Brothers in Arms" (1985)	"Walk of Life" (1985)	"Your Latest Trick" (1986)

"Walk of Life" is a song by the British rock band Dire Straits, the third track on their fifth studio album, Brothers in Arms (1985). It was released as a single in the US in October 1985 and in the UK in January 1986.

The track peaked at number seven in the US charts, becoming their third and last top ten hit. It was their biggest commercial hit in the UK (along with "Private Investigations"), peaking at number two. The track also appeared on three compilation albums: 1988's Money for Nothing, 1998's Sultans of Swing: The Very Best of Dire Straits, and 2005's The Best of Dire Straits & Mark Knopfler: Private Investigations. It also appeared on the band's live album On the Night (1993).

== History ==
Mark Knopfler told Classic Rock in 2015 how the song came about: "I saw a photograph of a kid playing a guitar in a subway, turning his face to the wall to get a good reverb. When I started playing the guitar, because I didn't have an amplifier, I'd put the head of the guitar on the arm of a chair and put my head on the guitar to try and get into a loud noise. It kind of reminded me of that, I suppose."

Knopfler had not originally intended "Walk of Life" for the album, but rather as a B-side to one of the singles. Dire Straits manager Ed Bicknell heard it when it was being mixed and convinced Knopfler to include it on the album at the last minute.

A simple rock and roll rhythm is used, with chord changes limited to I, IV and V chords. The introduction features a synthesizer-driven keyboard riff with hints of the blues. The singer mentioned in the lyrics, "Johnny", is said to perform "down in the tunnels, trying to make it pay", a reference to busking in the subway. The songs he plays are oldies, including "I Got a Woman", "Be-Bop-A-Lula", "What'd I Say", "My Sweet Lovin' Woman", and "Mack the Knife". He also plays talking blues.

== Music videos ==
Two music videos were produced for "Walk of Life". One shows the band playing the song in concert while the character Johnny is playing 1950s songs in the Tyne cyclist and pedestrian tunnel; the second features the band playing interspersed with clips of sports blooper and was exclusive to MTV.

== Reception ==
Cash Box said the song recalls "the band's '50s rock infatuation first heard on 'Twisting by the Pool'", but that it "is a more profound but equally energetic effort". Cash Box later said that "a light sound is balanced by a meaningful lyric and wrapped in trademark Knopfler guitar accents". Billboard said that "Knopfler and friends bob out to a cajun/zydeco track that might have sounded weird if Rockin' Sidney hadn't broken the ice."

== Use in media ==
"Walk of Life" has been used in the first scene of the first season and the final scene of the series finale of Young Sheldon. An instrumental version was featured in a British Gas advert in 2025.

== Chart performance ==
=== Weekly charts ===
Chart (1985–1986)	Peak position
Australia (Kent Music Report)	11
Austria (Ö3 Austria Top 40)	18
Belgium (Ultratop 50 Flanders)	32
Canada Top Singles (RPM)	7
Europe (European Hot 100 Singles)	8
Ireland (IRMA)	1
Netherlands (Dutch Top 40)	20
Netherlands (Single Top 100)	17
New Zealand (Recorded Music NZ)	3
Spain (AFYVE)	13
South Africa (Springbok Radio)	2
Switzerland (Schweizer Hitparade)	24
UK Singles (Official Charts)	2
US Billboard Hot 100	7
US Adult Contemporary (Billboard)	4
US Mainstream Rock Airplay (Billboard)	6
US Cash Box	10
West Germany (GfK)	15

Chart (2025–2026)	Peak position
Norway Airplay (IFPI Norge)	66
Sweden (Sverigetopplistan)	98

=== Year-end charts ===
Chart (1985)	Position
Canada Top Singles (RPM)	79

Chart (1986)	Position
Australia (Kent Music Report)	97
South Africa (Springbok Radio)	14
UK Singles (OCC)	49
US Billboard Hot 100	49
US Adult Contemporary (Billboard)	31
US Cash Box	92

== Certifications ==
Region	Certification	Certified units/sales
Denmark (IFPI Danmark)	Platinum	90,000^{‡}
Italy (FIMI)	Platinum	70,000^{‡}
New Zealand (RMNZ)	6× Platinum	180,000^{‡}
Spain (Promusicae)	2× Platinum	120,000^{‡}
United Kingdom (BPI)	3× Platinum	1,800,000^{‡}
^{‡} Sales+streaming figures based on certification alone.

== See also ==
- List of number-one singles of 1986 (Ireland)
