= Expresso Love =

Single by Dire Straits

from the album Making Movies
- A-side: "The Bug"
- Released: October 1980; 1984 (Alchemy version)
- Recorded: June 1980
- Genre: Roots rock
- Length: 5:12
- Label: Vertigo
- Songwriter(s): Mark Knopfler
- Producer(s): Mark Knopfler; Jimmy Iovine

Dire Straits singles chronology
"On Every Street" (1992)	"Expresso Love" / "The Bug" (1992)	"You and Your Friend" (1992)

"Expresso Love" is a song written by Dire Straits frontman Mark Knopfler for their third album Making Movies. It is one of their heavier songs, with a slightly overdriven guitar playing the main riff, which was recycled from the unreleased track "Making Movies". It also has a piano melody played throughout, which accompanies the guitar. "Expresso Love" also contains a reference to the earlier Dire Straits song "Wild West End" from their eponymous album, with the line "Hey mister, you wanna take a walk in the wild west end sometime?"

The song was one of four from Making Movies to be performed throughout the Love Over Gold and Brothers in Arms tours, with a particularly notable version on the live album Alchemy, but the song was dropped from the lineup afterwards. It was also a radio single in the United States, reaching #39 on the US Mainstream Rock chart.

In 1984, the live version from Alchemy was released as a single backed with the Alchemy edition of "Two Young Lovers", and the song was later re-released in CD format as one of the B-sides to the single "The Bug".
