= Going Home: Theme of the Local Hero =

Single by Mark Knopfler

from the album Local Hero
- Released: 4 March 1983
- Genre: Instrumental rock; Celtic rock
- Length: 5:00 (album version); 3:58 (single version)
- Label: Vertigo
- Songwriter: Mark Knopfler

Music video
- "Going Home"

"Going Home: Theme of the Local Hero" is an instrumental rock track by Mark Knopfler, and the closing track from the Local Hero (1983) film soundtrack.

== Reception ==
"Going Home: Theme of the Local Hero" was the debut solo single by Knopfler, and charted at number 56 in the UK, at number 26 in the Netherlands and at number 18 in New Zealand. The soundtrack album also features a reprise called "Wild Theme", which consists of Knopfler's acoustic guitar interpretation of the song's melody. Despite its rather modest chart position in Knopfler's native UK, "Going Home" remains one of the artist's most popular songs. The saxophone piece was played by the American jazz saxophonist Michael Brecker. The song is popular among fans of English football, in particular those of Knopfler's childhood home club, Newcastle United, as it is played as the team runs out before every home game.

== Music video ==
The music video features footage of Knopfler playing on the New York City waterfront (with the Twin Towers and Empire State Building visible), intercut with footage from the film.

== Other releases ==
Besides its popularity in Knopfler's solo live set, "Going Home" had also become a live staple for Dire Straits, entering the band's repertoire since its release, and the song's popularity grew thanks to its inclusion in the live album Alchemy: Dire Straits Live. The studio version of the song was included on the 1993 solo compilation Screenplaying (which also included "Wild Theme") and on the 2005 compilation Private Investigations, both on the single disc and double disc edition.

=== 2024 studio version ===
A supergroup, referred to as Mark Knopfler's Guitar Heroes, recorded "Going Home" to support the Teenage Cancer Trust and Teen Cancer America. The recording, released 15 March 2024, was Jeff Beck's final recording before his death. Peter Blake, who designed the sleeve for the Beatles' Sgt. Pepper's Lonely Hearts Club Band, created the single's artwork; a collage of all the contributors, plus Local Hero actors Peter Riegert and Burt Lancaster, in front of "Hanks", the famous guitar shop in London's Denmark Street. The sessions were recorded at British Grove Studios, although some performances were submitted remotely.

Produced by former Dire Straits keyboardist Guy Fletcher, more than sixty musicians, mostly guitar players, participated in the nine minute recording. All musicians listed below played electric guitar except where noted:

- Joan Armatrading
- Jeff Beck
- Richard Bennett
- Joe Bonamassa
- Joe Brown (mandolin)
- James Burton (acoustic guitar)
- Jonathan Cain (piano)
- Paul Carrack (Hammond organ)
- Eric Clapton (electric and acoustic guitar)
- Ry Cooder (slide guitar)
- Jim Cox (piano)
- Steve Cropper
- Sheryl Crow (bass)
- Danny Cummings (percussion)
- Roger Daltrey (harmonica)
- Duane Eddy
- Sam Fender
- Guy Fletcher (Hammond organ, bass)
- Peter Frampton
- Audley Freed
- David Gilmour
- Vince Gill (acoustic guitar)
- Buddy Guy
- Keiji Haino
- Tony Iommi
- Joan Jett
- John Jorgenson (acoustic guitar)
- Mark Knopfler
- Sonny Landreth
- Albert Lee
- Greg Leisz (lap steel guitar)
- Alex Lifeson
- Steve Lukather
- Phil Manzanera
- Dave Mason
- Hank Marvin
- Brian May
- Robbie McIntosh
- John McLaughlin
- Tom Morello
- Rick Nielsen
- Orianthi
- Brad Paisley
- Nile Rodgers
- Mike Rutherford
- Joe Satriani
- John Sebastian
- Connor Selby
- Slash
- Bruce Springsteen
- Ringo Starr (drums)
- Zak Starkey (drums)
- Sting (bass)
- Andy Taylor
- Susan Tedeschi
- Derek Trucks (slide guitar)
- Ian Thomas (drums)
- Pete Townshend
- Keith Urban
- Steve Vai
- Waddy Wachtel
- Joe Louis Walker
- Joe Walsh
- Ronnie Wood
- Glenn Worf (bass)
- Zucchero

== Charts ==
1983 chart performance for "Going Home"
Chart (1983)	Peak position
Netherlands (Single Top 100)	26
New Zealand (Recorded Music NZ)	18
UK Singles (Official Charts)	56

2024 chart performance for "Going Home"
Chart (2024)	Peak position
New Zealand Hot Singles (RMNZ)	32
UK Singles (Official Charts)	18
UK Independent (Official Charts)	4
