= Brothers in Arms (song) =

Single by Dire Straits

from the album Brothers in Arms
- B-side: "Going Home (Live)"; "Why Worry (Instrumental segment)"
- Released: 18 October 1985
- Studio: AIR (Salem, Montserrat)
- Genre: Rock; blues rock
- Length: 6:58 (full version); 6:05 (edited version); 4:55 (radio edit, included on Sultans of Swing)
- Label: Vertigo
- Songwriter: Mark Knopfler
- Producers: Neil Dorfsman; Mark Knopfler

Dire Straits singles chronology
| "Money for Nothing" (1985) | "Brothers in Arms" (1985) | "Walk of Life" (1985) |

"Brothers in Arms" is a song by British rock band Dire Straits, the closing track on their fifth studio album of the same name, released in May 1985. It was written in 1982, the year of Britain's involvement in the Falklands War.

In 2007, the 25th anniversary of the war, Mark Knopfler recorded a new version of the song at Abbey Road Studios to raise funds for British veterans who he said "are still suffering from the effects of that conflict." "Brothers in Arms" has become a favourite at military funerals.

== Release ==
This song was first released as a single on 18 October 1985.

== Description ==
The song's lyrics, influence, and impact were discussed from a variety of musical and personal perspectives in the BBC radio programme and podcast Soul Music first broadcast in September 2012.

The song, written during the Falklands War, is usually described as an anti-war song. Classic Rock critic Paul Rees rated "Brothers in Arms" to be Dire Straits' fifth greatest song, citing its "dignified but lasting power" and a "stunning guitar solo." Spin noted the "political theme with outstanding craftsmanship in the words and music", the "quiet but authoritative" singing, and the "dark swath of Knopfler's Les Paul".

== Music video ==
The music video, directed and animated by Bill Mather, produced by Simon Fields through Limelight Films and cinematographed by Francis Kenny, uses rotoscoping and shows the band performing, overlaid with images of the First World War. In contrast with the at-that-time very modern clip in "Money for Nothing", the video clip has a very classic appearance in noisy black and white images. It won the Grammy Award for Best Music Video at the 29th Annual Grammy Awards on 24 February 1987.

== In popular culture ==
The song has appeared in several television episodes including the second season finale of The West Wing, "One for the Road", the last episode of The Grand Tour presented by Jeremy Clarkson, Richard Hammond, and James May and the Season 2 episode "Out Where the Buses Don't Run" of Miami Vice.

== Track listings ==
7" single (DSTR 11)

1. "Brothers in Arms" – 6:04
2. "Going Home (Theme of the Local Hero)" (Live) – 4:45

12" Maxi-Single (DSTR 1112)

1. "Brothers in Arms" (Full Length Version) – 6:58
2. "Going Home (Theme of the Local Hero)" (Live) – 4:45
3. "Why Worry" (Instrumental Segment)

== Charts ==
| Chart (1985/88) | Peak position |
|---|---|
| UK Singles Chart | 16 |
| Australian Singles Chart | 57 |
| Dutch Top 40 | 59 |
| Irish Singles Chart | 10 |
| New Zealand Singles Chart | 5 |

== Certifications ==
| Region | Certification | Certified units/sales |
|---|---|---|
| Denmark (IFPI Danmark) | Platinum | 90,000^{‡} |
| Germany (BVMI) | Gold | 250,000^{‡} |
| Italy (FIMI) | Gold | 35,000^{‡} |
| Spain (Promusicae) | Gold | 30,000^{‡} |
| New Zealand (RMNZ) | 3× Platinum | 90,000^{‡} |
| United Kingdom (BPI) | Platinum | 600,000^{‡} |
^{‡} Sales+streaming figures based on certification alone.

== See also ==
- List of anti-war songs
