= Love over Gold (song) =

Song by British rock band Dire Straits

Song by Dire Straits

from the album Love over Gold
- Released: September 24, 1982
- Recorded: 1982
- Genre: Jazz rock; progressive rock
- Length: 6:15
- Label: Vertigo
- Songwriter: Mark Knopfler
- Producer: Mark Knopfler

"Love over Gold"

Single by Dire Straits

from the album Alchemy: Dire Straits Live
- B-side: "Solid Rock"
- Released: 10 February 1984
- Recorded: 1983
- Length: 3:36
- Songwriter: Mark Knopfler

Dire Straits singles chronology
"Twisting by the Pool" (1983)	"Love over Gold" (1984)	"So Far Away" (1985)

"Love over Gold" is a song by British rock band Dire Straits. It is the fourth track and title track from the band's 1982 album. A shorter live version of the song, taken from the album Alchemy: Dire Straits Live, was released as a single.

== Meaning and structure ==
The protagonist of the text is a fragile, inconsistent and standoffish female figure. Musically, the song has an elegant jazz-influenced arrangement, built around the dialogue between Knopfler's guitar and the Mike Mainieri's vibraphone. Rolling Stone describes "Love over Gold" as "a whispery ballad that plays the jazzy tingle of vibes against an almost classical piano air and the violinlike pluck of a synthesizer to heighten its images of a casual, even cavalier, sex life."

The tune of the first and third verses are used as the verse and chorus for "Private Dancer" also written by Mark Knopfler and recorded by Tina Turner in 1983.

== Chart performance ==
"Love over Gold" reached its highest position in France (No. 15), while peaking at No. 29 in New Zealand, No. 43 in the Netherlands and No. 50 in the band's native United Kingdom.

== Other releases ==
The live version of the song was included on the 1998 compilation Sultans of Swing: The Very Best of Dire Straits, while the original album version was included on the 2005 compilation Private Investigations: The Best of Dire Straits & Mark Knopfler.
