= Sultans of Swing =

1978 single by Dire Straits

Single by Dire Straits

from the album Dire Straits
- B-side: "Eastbound Train"; "Southbound Again"
- Released: 19 May 1978
- Recorded: February 1978 (album version)
- Studio: Basing Street, London
- Genre: Pub rock; roots rock
- Length: 5:47
- Label: Vertigo; Warner Bros.
- Songwriter: Mark Knopfler
- Producer: Muff Winwood

Dire Straits singles chronology
"Sultans of Swing" (1978)	"Water of Love" (1978)

Audio sample
- file; help

Music video
- "Sultans of Swing" on YouTube

"Sultans of Swing" is a song by the British rock band Dire Straits, written by the lead vocalist and guitarist Mark Knopfler. Dire Straits recorded a demo at Pathway Studios, North London, in July 1977, and it acquired a following after it was put in rotation on BBC Radio London. After Dire Straits signed a record contract with Phonogram Records, they rerecorded it in February 1978 at Basing Street Studios for their debut album, Dire Straits.

The B-side, "Eastbound Train", is a live track. "Sultans of Swing" reached the top five in Canada, South Africa, and the United States, and the top 10 in the United Kingdom, Ireland, and Australia. It remains a staple of classic rock radio and is one of Dire Straits' most recognisable songs.

== Writing ==
"Sultans of Swing" was composed by Mark Knopfler on a National Steel guitar in open tuning. He thought it was dull until he bought his first Fender Stratocaster in 1977: "It just came alive as soon as I played it on that '61 Strat ... the new chord changes just presented themselves and fell into place."

The lyrics were inspired by a performance of a Dixieland jazz band playing in the corner of an almost empty pub in Deptford, South London. At the end of their performance, the singer announced their name, the Sultans of Swing. Knopfler found the contrast between their dowdy appearance and surroundings and their grandiose name amusing.

== Recording ==
Shortly after Dire Straits formed in 1977, they recorded a five-song demo tape at Pathway Studios, including "Sultans of Swing". They took the tape to DJ Charlie Gillett, the presenter of Honky Tonk on BBC Radio London, hoping for advice. Gillett put "Sultans of Swing" on his rotation. Two months later, Dire Straits signed a recording contract with Phonogram Records. In February 1978, Dire Straits rerecorded "Sultans of Swing" at Basing Street Studios for their debut album, Dire Straits, produced by Muff Winwood.

== Composition ==
"Sultans of Swing" uses common time, with a tempo of 149 beats per minute. It is in the key of D minor with Knopfler's vocal range spanning G_{2} to D_{4}. It uses a chord progression of Dm–C–B♭–A for the verses, and F–C–B♭ for the choruses. The riff uses triads, particularly second inversions. The song employs the Andalusian cadence or diatonic phrygian tetrachord. All the chords are compatible with a D natural minor scale, except for the A major triad, which suggests a D harmonic minor scale. Knopfler used similar triads on "Lady Writer".

== Personnel ==
- Mark Knopfler – vocals, lead and rhythm guitars
- David Knopfler – rhythm guitar
- John Illsley – bass
- Pick Withers – drums

== Critical reception ==
Ken Tucker of Rolling Stone singled out "Sultans of Swing" as a highlight of the album for its "inescapable hook" and compared Knopfler's vocals to those of Bob Dylan. Cash Box likened the vocals to Lou Reed and wrote that "the arrangement of moderate beat and excellent guitar work are exceptionally fluid and engaging". Record World said that "The lyrics are thoughtful and the hook instantly memorable". The New Rolling Stone Album Guide called the song "an insinuating bit of bar-band mythmaking" whose lyrics "paint a vivid picture of an overlooked and underappreciated pub combo".

The Spokane Chronicle's Jim Kershner wrote that "Sultans of Swing" is "remarkable, both for its lyrics that made fun of hip young Londoners and the phenomenal guitar sound of Knopfler", which "sounded like no other guitar on radio". Jon Marlowe of The Palm Beach Post called it "an infectious, sounds-damn-good-on-the-car-radio ode to every bar band who has ever done four sets a night, seven nights a week". Classic Rock critic Paul Rees rated the live version on Alchemy to be Dire Straits' greatest song.

In 2013, Rick Moore of American Songwriter wrote:

With "Sultans of Swing" a breath of fresh air was exhaled into the airwaves in the late '70s. Sure, Donald Fagen and Tom Waits were writing great lyrics about characters you'd love to meet and Jeff Beck and Eddie Van Halen were great guitar players. But Knopfler, he could do both things as well or better than anybody out there in his own way, and didn't seem to have any obvious rock influences unless you try to include Dylan. Like his contemporary and future duet partner Sting, Knopfler's ideas were intellectually and musically stimulating, but were also accessible to the average listener. It was almost like jazz for the layman. "Sultans of Swing" was a lesson in prosody and tasty guitar playing that has seldom been equaled since. If you aren't familiar with "Sultans of Swing" or haven't listened to it in a while, you should definitely check it out.

Record Mirror named "Sultans of Swing" the tenth-best song of 1977. In 1992, Life named it one of the top five songs of 1978. In 1993, Paul Williams included it in his book Rock and Roll: The 100 Best Singles. The song is on The Rock and Roll Hall of Fame's 500 Songs that Shaped Rock and Roll list, Dire Straits' only appearance. In 2006, Mojo included it in a list of the 50 best British songs. Guitar World ranked its guitar solo at the 7th greatest, and Rolling Stone named it the 32nd-greatest guitar song.

== Charts and re-releases ==
The song was originally released in the UK in May 1978, but it did not chart at the time. However, the song became a hit in The Netherlands and Belgium in September 1978. The single was then released in the United States in January 1979 and entered the American music pop chart. The success of this single release came around three months after the relatively unheralded US-release of the band's debut album in October 1978. BBC Radio was initially unwilling to play the song due to its high lyrical content but after it entered the charts in the US, their line softened. Eventually, the song hit No. 4 on the Billboard Hot 100. The single was re-released in the UK on 16 February 1979, this time reaching No. 8 on the UK Singles Chart and helped drive sales of the album, which also became a hit.

"Sultans of Swing" was re-issued again as a single in October 1988, after it appeared on the band's greatest hits album Money for Nothing, when it peaked at No. 62. It was also included on Sultans of Swing: The Very Best of Dire Straits and The Best of Dire Straits & Mark Knopfler: Private Investigations.

== Other versions ==
Knopfler has improvised and expanded the solo during live performances. The coda of the live recording on the 1984 album Alchemy stretches the song to nearly 11 minutes, likewise with the band’s performance at Live Aid. At the 1988 Nelson Mandela 70th Birthday Tribute concert in London, Eric Clapton teamed up with the band, providing rhythm guitar.

== Charts ==
=== Weekly charts ===
1978–1979 weekly chart peaks for "Sultans of Swing"
Chart (1978–1979)	Peak position
Australia (Kent Music Report)	6
Belgium (Ultratop 50 Flanders)	14
Canadian RPM Adult Contemporary	26
Canadian RPM Top Singles	4
German Singles Chart	20
Ireland (IRMA)	6
Netherlands (Dutch Top 40)	11
New Zealand Singles Chart	12
South African Chart	3
UK Singles (OCC)	8
US Billboard Hot 100	4
US Billboard Adult Contemporary	46

2025–2026 weekly chart peaks for "Sultans of Swing"
Chart (2025–2026)	Peak position
Greece International (IFPI)	80
Portugal (AFP)	95
Sweden (Sverigetopplistan)	51
UK Singles Chart	41

=== Year-end charts ===
1978 year-end positions for "Sultans of Swing"
Chart (1978)	Rank
Australia (Kent Music Report)	85

1979 year-end positions for "Sultans of Swing"
Chart (1979)	Rank
Canada Top Singles (RPM)	47
US Top Pop Singles (Billboard)	61

2025 year-end positions for Sultans of Swing"
Chart (2025)	Rank
Netherlands (Single Top 100)	59
Sweden (Sverigetopplistan)	69

== Certifications ==
Certifications for "Sultans of Swing"
Region	Certification	Certified units/sales
Brazil (Pro-Música Brasil)	Platinum	60,000^{‡}
Canada (Music Canada)	Gold	75,000^{^}
Denmark (IFPI Danmark)	2× Platinum	180,000^{‡}
Germany (BVMI)	Platinum	600,000^{‡}
Italy (FIMI)	3× Platinum	300,000^{‡}
New Zealand (RMNZ)	10× Platinum	300,000^{‡}
Portugal (AFP)	5× Platinum	50,000^{‡}
Spain (Promusicae)	4× Platinum	240,000^{‡}
United Kingdom (BPI)	4× Platinum	2,400,000^{‡}
Streaming
Greece (IFPI Greece)	3× Platinum	6,000,000^{†}
^{^} Shipments figures based on certification alone.^{‡} Sales+streaming figures based on certification alone.^{†} Streaming-only figures based on certification alone.
