= ExtendedancEPlay =

Extendedance Play

EP by Dire Straits
- Released: 14 January 1983
- Recorded: 1–3 October 1982
- Studio: Jam Studios
- Genre: Rock and roll
- Length: 16:04
- Labels: Vertigo, Warner Bros.
- Producer: Mark Knopfler

Dire Straits chronology
Love over Gold (1982)	Extendedance Play (1983)	Alchemy (1984)

Singles from Extendedance Play
- 1. "Twisting by the Pool" Released: 14 January 1983

Professional ratings
Review scores
Source	Rating
AllMusic	3.5/5 stars

Extendedance Play (Note: stylized as ExtendedancEPlay) is a studio 12″ EP by British rock band Dire Straits, released on 14 January 1983 by Vertigo Records internationally, and by Warner Bros. Records in the United States. The record contains three tracks on the international version and four on the U.S. version, which also included the song "Badges, Posters, Stickers, T-Shirts," an outtake from the Love over Gold sessions that had been released in other territories as the B-side to "Private Investigations".

The EP consists of upbeat tracks with a rock and roll, jazz and swing feel. It is the first release by the band to feature drummer Terry Williams, who filled the spot after drummer Pick Withers left the group in 1982.

This EP has never been released on compact disc except for a very rare CD-Video. However, "Twisting by the Pool" appears on the compilations Money for Nothing and Sultans of Swing: The Very Best of Dire Straits, and a live version of "Two Young Lovers" is featured on Alchemy: Dire Straits Live.

== Track listing ==
All songs were written by Mark Knopfler.

The original vinyl EP presented tracks 1–2 on side A, and tracks 3–4 on side B.

No.	Title	Length
1.	"Twisting by the Pool"	3:32
2.	"Badges, Posters, Stickers, T-Shirts" (U.S. version only)	4:54
3.	"Two Young Lovers"	3:22
4.	"If I Had You"	4:16
Total length:		16:04

== Personnel ==
Dire Straits

- Mark Knopfler – vocals, lead guitar
- Hal Lindes – rhythm guitar, backing vocals
- Alan Clark – piano, Hammond organ, synthesizer
- John Illsley – bass, backing vocals
- Terry Williams – drums (1, 3, 4)
- Pick Withers – drums (2)

Additional personnel

- Mel Collins – saxophone (3)

Production

- Mark Knopfler – producer
- John Etchells – engineer

== Charts ==
Chart (1983)	Peak position
US Billboard 200	53
