= Love over Gold =

Studio album by Dire Straits
- Released: 24 September 1982
- Recorded: 8 March – 11 June 1982
- Studio: Power Station (New York City)
- Genres: Jazz rock; progressive rock
- Length: 41:10
- Labels: Vertigo; Warner Bros.
- Producer: Mark Knopfler

Dire Straits chronology
Making Movies (1980)	Love over Gold (1982)	ExtendedancEPlay (1983)

Singles from Love over Gold
- 1. "Private Investigations" Released: 27 August 1982; 2. "Industrial Disease" Released: November 1982

Love over Gold is the fourth studio album by British rock band Dire Straits, released on 24 September 1982 by Vertigo Records internationally and by Warner Bros. Records in the United States.

The album, which has just five tracks, featured two singles: "Private Investigations", which reached No. 2 on the UK singles chart, and "Industrial Disease", which reached No. 9 on Billboard's Hot Mainstream Rock Tracks chart in the United States. The title track was never released as a single, but two years later a live version from Alchemy: Dire Straits Live reached No. 15 in France, No. 29 in New Zealand, No. 43 in the Netherlands and No. 50 in the band's native United Kingdom. The album reached number one on album charts in Australia, Austria, Italy, New Zealand, Norway and the United Kingdom, as well as number 19 in the United States. Love over Gold was later certified gold in the United States, platinum in France and Germany, and double platinum in Canada and the United Kingdom.

== Background ==
Following the end of the On Location Tour on 6 July 1981 in Luxembourg, Mark Knopfler began writing songs for Dire Straits' next album. Keyboard player Alan Clark and Californian guitarist Hal Lindes, who both joined the band at the end of 1980 for the On Location Tour, would also be involved with the new album. This was also the last album to feature drummer Pick Withers.

"Telegraph Road" is the album’s opening track and, at over 14 minutes, its longest. Knopfler was inspired to write the song after Dire Straits' tour bus drove for miles along Telegraph Road in Detroit:

I was reading a book at the time called The Growth of the Soil and I just put the two together...it's the same road, and it just went on and on and on forever, it's like what they call linear development, and I just started to think. I wondered how that road must have been when it started, what it must have first been...I was actually sitting in the front of the tour bus at the time.

== Recording ==
Love over Gold was recorded at the Power Station in New York from 8 March to 11 June 1982. Knopfler produced the album, with Neil Dorfsman as his engineer—the first in a long line of collaborations between the two.

Knopfler used several guitars during the sessions, including four Schecter Stratocasters—two red, one blue, and one sunburst—a black Schecter Telecaster, an Ovation classical guitar on "Private Investigations" and "Love over Gold", a custom Erlewine Automatic on "Industrial Disease" and his 1937 National steel guitar on "Telegraph Road". Knopfler also used Ovation twelve- and six-string acoustic guitars during the recording.

A few songs were written and recorded during the Love over Gold sessions that were not released on the album. "Private Dancer" was originally planned for the album, with all but the vocal tracks being recorded. Knopfler decided that a female voice would be more appropriate and handed the song to Tina Turner for her comeback album, Private Dancer. "The Way It Always Starts" ended up on Knopfler's soundtrack to the film Local Hero, with vocals sung by Gerry Rafferty. "Badges, Posters, Stickers, T-Shirts" was cut from the album and later released in the UK as a B-side to "Private Investigations" and in the United States as the B-side to "Industrial Disease". It was subsequently released in the United States as the third track on the ExtendedancEPlay EP.

== Release ==
Love over Gold was released on 24 September 1982 initially on vinyl LP and cassette, and later on compact disc. "Private Investigations" was released as the lead single from the album in Europe. It reached the number 2 position in the United Kingdom, despite its almost seven minute length, and was Dire Straits’ first single in the UK to reach the top 5. In the United States the shortest track "Industrial Disease" was released as a single, reaching the 75 position on the Billboard Hot 100 in 1983.

The album was remastered and reissued with the rest of the Dire Straits catalogue in 1996 by Vertigo Records internationally, and in 2000 by Warner Bros. records in the United States. The remastered CD features slightly altered cover art; the album title is rendered underneath the band name, both in larger type, rather than arranged across the top. The image of lightning is also somewhat zoomed in and made brighter, making for a more purple color. It remains the only remastered Dire Straits CD with altered cover art (the U.S. remastered CD still retains the original vinyl LP art).

Love over Gold was the final album to feature original drummer Pick Withers, who was replaced by former Dave Edmunds / Rockpile drummer Terry Williams. Dire Straits then embarked on the eight-month-long Love Over Gold Tour which finished with two sold-out concerts at London's Hammersmith Odeon on 22 and 23 July 1983. In January 1983 a four-song EP titled ExtendedancEPlay was released while Love over Gold was still in the album charts. The double album Alchemy Live was a recording of excerpts from the final two concerts of the tour and was reportedly released without studio overdubs. The concert was also issued on VHS and Laserdisc, and was remastered and released on DVD and Blu-ray in 2010.

"Private Investigations" continued to be played throughout the Brothers in Arms and On Every Street tours, while "Telegraph Road" returned to the band's set list in 1991 during Dire Straits' final 1991-92 tour, and Knopfler continued to perform the track during his tours as a solo artist.

== Critical reception ==
Professional ratings
Review scores
Source	Rating
AllMusic	4/5 stars
Christgau's Record Guide	C+
Encyclopedia of Popular Music	3/5 stars
The Great Rock Discography	6/10
Mojo	5/5 stars
MusicHound	3.5/5
Pitchfork	8.7/10
Rolling Stone	4/5 stars
The Rolling Stone Album Guide	4/5 stars
Smash Hits	7/10

In a contemporary review for Rolling Stone, David Fricke called Love over Gold "an ambitious, sometimes difficult record that is exhilarating in its successes and, at the very least, fascinating in its indulgences." Fricke remarked that the album more deeply and at times more dramatically explores a dichotomy present on Dire Straits' earlier albums, between fiery angst and soft sensitivity. He concluded that "in a period when most pop music is conceived purely as product, Love over Gold dares to put art before airplay."

In a retrospective review for AllMusic, Stephen Thomas Erlewine said that the addition of a new rhythm guitarist "expands [Dire Straits'] sounds and ambitions". Erlewine added, "Since Mark Knopfler is a skilled, tasteful guitarist, he can sustain interest even throughout the languid stretches, but the long, atmospheric, instrumental passages aren't as effective as the group's tight blues-rock, leaving Love over Gold only a fitfully engaging listen."

== Track listing ==
All tracks are written by Mark Knopfler.

Side one
No.	Title	Length
1.	"Telegraph Road"	14:18
2.	"Private Investigations"	6:46

Side two
No.	Title	Length
3.	"Industrial Disease"	5:50
4.	"Love over Gold"	6:17
5.	"It Never Rains"	7:59
Total length:		41:10

== Personnel ==
Dire Straits

- Mark Knopfler – vocals, guitars
- Hal Lindes – guitars
- John Illsley – bass
- Alan Clark – keyboards
- Pick Withers – drums

Additional musicians

- Ed Walsh – synthesizer programming
- Mike Mainieri – vibraphone and marimba (2, 4)

Production

- Mark Knopfler – producer
- Neil Dorfsman – engineer
- Barry Bongiovi – assistant engineer
- Bob Ludwig – mastering at Masterdisk (New York City, New York, USA)
- Peter Cunningham – photography
- Alan Lobel – photography
- Michae Rowe – sleeve design
- Damage Management – management

== Charts ==
=== Weekly charts ===
Love over Gold spent 200 weeks in the UK Albums Chart.

Chart (1982–83)	Peak position
Australian Albums (Kent Music Report)	1
Austrian Albums (Ö3 Austria)	1
Dutch Albums (Album Top 100)	1
German Albums (Offizielle Top 100)	4
Italian Albums (Musica e Dischi)	1
New Zealand Albums (RMNZ)	1
Norwegian Albums (VG-lista)	1
Spanish Albums Chart	6
Swedish Albums (Sverigetopplistan)	2
UK Albums (Official Charts)	1
US Billboard 200	19

Chart (2014)	Peak position
Italian Albums (FIMI)	81

=== Year-end charts ===
Chart (1982)	Position
Austrian Albums (Ö3 Austria)	20
Dutch Albums (Album Top 100)	2
Italian Albums (Musica e Dischi)	18
New Zealand Albums (RMNZ)	2

Chart (1983)	Position
Austrian Albums (Ö3 Austria)	18
Dutch Albums (Album Top 100)	91
German Albums (Offizielle Top 100)	26
Italian Albums (Musica e Dischi)	28
New Zealand Albums (RMNZ)	5

Chart (1986)	Position
New Zealand Albums (RMNZ)	42

== Certifications and sales ==
Region	Certification	Certified units/sales
Australia (ARIA)	2× Platinum	100,000^{^}
Austria (IFPI Austria)	Platinum	50,000^{*}
Belgium (BRMA)	Gold	25,000^{*}
Brazil	—	60,000
Canada (Music Canada)	2× Platinum	200,000^{^}
Denmark (IFPI Danmark)	Silver	25,000
Finland (Musiikkituottajat)	Platinum	64,912
France (SNEP)	Platinum	400,000^{*}
Germany (BVMI)	Platinum	500,000^{^}
Israel	Silver	
Italy (FIMI) original release	Gold	100,000
Italy (FIMI) sales since 2009	Gold	25,000^{‡}
Netherlands (NVPI)	2× Platinum	364,501
New Zealand (RMNZ)	3× Platinum	45,000^{^}
Norway (IFPI Norway)	Gold	50,000
South Africa (RISA)	Platinum	50,000^{*}
Spain (Promusicae)	Gold	50,000^{^}
Sweden (GLF)	Gold	50,000^{^}
Switzerland (IFPI Switzerland)	Platinum	50,000^{^}
United Kingdom (BPI)	2× Platinum	600,000^{^}
United States (RIAA)	Gold	500,000^{^}
Yugoslavia	—	21,979
^{*} Sales figures based on certification alone.^{^} Shipments figures based on certification alone.^{‡} Sales+streaming figures based on certification alone.
