= Twisting by the Pool =

Single by Dire Straits

from the album ExtendedancEPlay
- B-side: "Two Young Lovers"; "If I Had You"
- Released: 14 January 1983
- Genre: Rock and roll
- Length: 3:32
- Label: Vertigo
- Songwriter: Mark Knopfler
- Producer: Mark Knopfler

Dire Straits singles chronology
"Industrial Disease" (1982)	"Twisting by the Pool" (1983)	"Love over Gold" (live) (1984)

"Twisting by the Pool" is a song by British rock band Dire Straits that appears on ExtendedancEPlay. It was released as a single in 1983, peaking at No. 1 in New Zealand, No. 14 on the UK Singles Chart and No. 12 on the US Billboard Rock Top Tracks chart. A remix of the song appeared on the band's 1988 greatest hits album Money for Nothing.

== Composition ==
The song is set in the time signature of common time, with a tempo of 182 beats per minute. It is composed in the key of A major with Knopfler's vocal range spanning from A_{2} to E_{4}. The song has a basic sequence of A–D–E as its chord progression.

== Critical reception ==
William Ruhlmann of AllMusic retrospectively praised the song, calling it "the closest thing to exuberant rock & roll this seemingly humorless band had ever attempted."

== Live performances ==
The song was performed live as early as 1979 and is featured on the Live at the Rainbow concert recorded in London in December 1979, released in 2024 as part of the Dire Straits Live 1978–1992 box set.

== Charts ==
=== Weekly charts ===
Chart (1983)	Peak position
Australia (Kent Music Report)	2
Belgium (Ultratop 50 Flanders)	6
Canada Top Singles (RPM)	18
Finland (Suomen virallinen lista)	7
France (IFOP)	29
Ireland (IRMA)	13
Netherlands (Dutch Top 40)	5
Netherlands (Single Top 100)	6
New Zealand (Recorded Music NZ)	1
Norway (VG-lista)	6
Sweden (Sverigetopplistan)	13
Switzerland (Schweizer Hitparade)	11
UK Singles (Official Charts)	14
US Mainstream Rock (Billboard)	12
West Germany (GfK)	31

=== Year-end charts ===
Chart (1983)	Position
Australia (Kent Music Report)	14
Netherlands (Single Top 100)	66
New Zealand (RIANZ)	17

== See also ==
- List of number-one singles from the 1980s (New Zealand)
