= This Is Us (Mark Knopfler and Emmylou Harris song) =

2006 song by Mark Knopfler

Single by Mark Knopfler featuring Emmylou Harris

from the album All the Roadrunning
- Released: 2006
- Length: 4:35
- Label: Mercury Records
- Songwriter: Mark Knopfler
- Producers: Mark Knopfler, Chuck Ainlay

"This Is Us" is a song written by Mark Knopfler and performed in duet with Emmylou Harris. It was released as the first single from the 2006 duet album All the Roadrunning, as a promo CD single like previous single "All the Roadrunning" (which was actually the single released for the compilation Private Investigations, despite giving the title to the album released in 2006).

"This Is Us" reached No. 5 on the Billboard Adult Alternative Airplay chart.
