= British Grove Studios =

Recording studios in London

Coordinates: 51.49153°N 0.24575°W

British Grove Studios is a recording studio located at 20 British Grove in Chiswick, West London, and owned by musician Mark Knopfler.

British Grove Studios was built by David Stewart, the studio's former manager, and commissioned by Knopfler as "a monument to past and future technology". It has two studios. Alongside modern technology, the equipment includes two old EMI mixing consoles: a very rare tube desk from the 1960s like the ones used by George Martin and The Beatles, and a later console on which the album Band on the Run was recorded. The large console in studio one is a custom-made Neve 88R, while the console in studio two is an API Legacy. The main speakers are ATC monitors in a 5.1 configuration. Specifically, the full-range models are ATC SCM 300ASL (300A) mounted in standard left-center-right configuration, with two more 300As on a unique track system for surround. Dual ATC SCM0.1/15ASL PRO (Sub 1/15) subwoofers alongside the left and right mains provide the LFE monitoring.

In February 2009, British Grove Studio was the winner of the Music Producers Guild Award for 'Best Studio'.

Before Richard Wright died in 2008, he went to British Grove Studios to record a missing piano part from "Shine on You Crazy Diamond" by Pink Floyd. This was found to be missing by James Guthrie, who was remixing the Wish You Were Here album for an SACD release.

== Recordings ==
The following albums were recorded at British Grove Studios:

- Razorlight by Razorlight (2006)
- On an Island by David Gilmour (2006) (sections of the album)
- The Boy with No Name by Travis (2007)
- Kill to Get Crimson by Mark Knopfler (2007)
- Footsteps by Chris de Burgh (2008)
- The Age of the Understatement by The Last Shadow Puppets (2008)
- Hayley Sings Japanese Songs by Hayley Westenra (2008)
- Beautiful You by Greg Pearle and John Illsley (2008)
- Songs for My Mother by Ronan Keating (2009)
- Get Lucky by Mark Knopfler (2009)
- Endlessly by Duffy (2010)
- Serotonin by Mystery Jets (2010)
- The Sailor's Revenge by Bap Kennedy (2012)
- Privateering by Mark Knopfler (2012)
- Heart of Nowhere by Noah and the Whale (2013)
- Tierra by Vicente Amigo (2013)
- The Breeze: An Appreciation of JJ Cale by Eric Clapton & Friends (2014)
- The New Classic by Iggy Azalea (2014)
- Kablammo! by ASH (2015)
- Tracker by Mark Knopfler (2015)
- I Still Do by Eric Clapton (2016)
- Believe by Jonathan Antoine (2016)
- Blue & Lonesome by The Rolling Stones (2016)
- Down the Road Wherever by Mark Knopfler (2018)
- Coming up for Air by John Illsley (2019)
- Who by The Who (2019)
- Taller by Jamie Cullum (2019)
- Notes On A Conditional Form by The 1975 (2020)
- i/o by Peter Gabriel (2023) (orchestral parts only)
- Luck and Strange by David Gilmour (2024)
- One Deep River by Mark Knopfler (2024)
- o\i by Peter Gabriel (2026) (orchestral parts only)

== David Stewart and Dave Harries ==
Together, David Stewart and Dave Harries set up 'British Grove Studios' in the early 2000s for Mark Knopfler of Dire Straits. As cited in 'The Chiswick Calendar', "David Stewart knew Mark through his wife Robyn, who was Mark’s PA. He introduced Mark to Dave Harries with whom he had been working for ten years already at that point, and the two of them set about scouring west London in 2000 – 2001 looking for suitable properties." They decided upon the property in Chiswick largely because of its size and proximity to Heathrow airport, convenient for the numerous American artists travelling to record at the studio. Upon its completion, Stewart made the natural progression (having overseen the project from the outset) of becoming 'Studio Manager'.

On 9 April 2020, Stewart died of complications from COVID-19. In a statement, Knopfler said, "I am very sad to announce the loss of our dear friend David Stewart, our studio Manager. David will be sorely missed, not only by everyone at British Grove but also by everybody who knew him. Our hearts go out to our beloved Robyn and their two sons Jake and Tommy".
