= A Shot at Glory (soundtrack) =

Soundtrack album by Mark Knopfler
- Released: 28 April 2002
- Recorded: Castle Sound Studio, 1999–2000
- Genre: Film music, Celtic music
- Length: 37:46
- Label: Mercury
- Producer: Mark Knopfler, Guy Fletcher

Mark Knopfler chronology
Sailing to Philadelphia (2000)	A Shot at Glory (2002)	The Ragpicker's Dream (2002)

A Shot at Glory is the eighth soundtrack album by British singer-songwriter and guitarist Mark Knopfler, released on 28 April 2002 by Mercury Records. The album contains music composed for the 2001 film A Shot at Glory, directed by Michael Corrente.

== Critical reception ==
Professional ratings
Review scores
Source	Rating
AllMusic	3/5 stars

In his review for AllMusic, William Ruhlmann gave the album three out of five stars, noting that Knopfler's soundtrack albums are so closely identified with him that "it's a dilemma where to shelve them in the record store." Ruhlmann continued:

The music will come as no surprise to anyone who's seen and heard such previous Knopfler soundtracks as those for Local Hero and The Princess Bride. There are some Scottish themes in keeping with the movie's setting ..., a couple of slow-moving instrumentals in which Knopfler fingerpicks an acoustic guitar, and three vocal tracks. "He's the Man" sounds like it could fit on a Dire Straits or Knopfler solo album, with its rocking tune; "Say Too Much" is a jazzy number with trumpet and saxophone solos, but minimal lyrics; and "All That I Have in the World" is a tender ballad. Chalk up another Mark Knopfler soundtrack that finds him repeating himself, however pleasantly.

== Track listing ==
All music was written by Mark Knopfler, except where indicated.

No.	Title	Writer(s)	Length
1.	"Sons of Scotland"		2:18
2.	"Hard Cases"		3:27
3.	"He's the Man"		4:42
4.	"Training"		3:29
5.	"The New Laird"		2:21
6.	"Say Too Much"		2:39
7.	"Four in a Row"		4:42
8.	"All That I Have in the World"		3:22
9.	"Sons of Scotland – Quiet Theme"		3:00
10.	"It's Over"		4:10
11.	"Wild Mountain Thyme"	Francis McPeake	3:36
Total length:			37:46

== Personnel ==
Music

- Mark Knopfler – guitars, bass
- Guy Fletcher – keyboards
- Billy Jackson – harp, bodhran, whistle
- Iain Lothian – piano accordion
- Steve Sidwell – flugelhorn
- Danny Cummings – percussion
- Iain MacInnes – bagpipes
- Chris White – tenor and soprano saxophone
- Catriona MacDonald – fiddle

Production

- Mark Knopfler – producer
- Guy Fletcher – producer
