= All the Roadrunning (song) =

2005 song by Mark Knopfler

Single by Mark Knopfler featuring Emmylou Harris

from the album Private Investigations
- Released: 2005
- Genre: Country rock; Celtic folk
- Length: 4:00
- Label: Mercury Records
- Songwriter(s): Mark Knopfler
- Producer(s): Mark Knopfler, Chuck Ainlay

"All the Roadrunning" is a song written and performed by Mark Knopfler featuring American country singer Emmylou Harris. It was first released as a new track on Knopfler's career-spanning compilation Private Investigations and as a CD single in 2005. In April 2006, the song was also released on the album of the same title.

== Critical acclaim ==
The reviews of "All the Roadrunning" were positive. Allmusic described the new song on the 2005 compilation as "nice" and "beautiful", as well as a song that "keeps the line of continuity and excellence in perspective." Hybridmagazine describes the song as having a "celtic folk melody" and as "accented by delicate mandolin and soaring fiddle strains, while the lyrics are a wistful account of life on the road that finds the lead character taking stock of the sacrifices and benefits of roaming."
