= Last Exit to Brooklyn (soundtrack) =

Soundtrack album by Mark Knopfler
- Released: 3 October 1989
- Recorded: AIR Studios, London, 1989
- Genre: Film music
- Length: 41:22
- Label: Vertigo; Warner Bros. (USA)
- Producer: Mark Knopfler

Mark Knopfler chronology
The Princess Bride (1987)	Last Exit to Brooklyn (1989)	Missing... Presumed Having a Good Time (1990)

Last Exit to Brooklyn is the fifth soundtrack album by British singer-songwriter and guitarist Mark Knopfler, released on 3 October 1989 by Vertigo Records internationally, and by Warner Bros. Records in the United States. The album contains music composed for the 1989 film Last Exit to Brooklyn, produced by Bernd Eichinger and directed by Uli Edel.

== Critical reception ==
Professional ratings
Review scores
Source	Rating
AllMusic	3/5 stars

In his review for AllMusic, William Ruhlmann gave the album three out of five stars, calling it Knopfler's "most ambitious and accomplished soundtrack." Ruhlmann noted that unlike Knopfler's first three soundtracks, the music for Last Exit to Brooklyn "did not sound like outtakes from Dire Straits sessions, but instead consisted of fully orchestrated scoring."

== Track listing ==
All music was written by Mark Knopfler.

No.	Title	Length
1.	"Last Exit to Brooklyn"	5:03
2.	"Victims"	3:33
3.	"Think Fast"	2:47
4.	"A Love Idea"	3:05
5.	"Tralala"	5:31
6.	"Riot"	6:22
7.	"The Reckoning"	7:13
8.	"As Low as it Gets"	1:30
9.	"Finale – Last Exit to Brooklyn"	6:18
Total length:		41:22

== Personnel ==
Music

- Guy Fletcher – keyboards
- Mark Knopfler - guitar (5)
- David Nolan – violin (4)
- Irvine Arditti – violin (9)

Production

- Mark Knopfler – producer
- Bill Schnee – mixing
- Don Cobb – digital editing
- Denny Purcell – remastering
- Jonathan Russell – remastering assistant
