= Down the Road Wherever =

Studio album by Mark Knopfler
- Released: 16 November 2018
- Recorded: Summer 2017, January–February 2018.
- Studio: British Grove, Chiswick, West London
- Length: 71:27
- Label: British Grove; Virgin EMI; Blue Note
- Producer: Mark Knopfler; Guy Fletcher

Mark Knopfler chronology
Altamira (2016)	Down the Road Wherever (2018)	One Deep River (2024)

Down the Road Wherever is the ninth solo studio album by British singer-songwriter and guitarist Mark Knopfler, released on 16 November 2018 by British Grove Records via Virgin EMI in the UK and via Blue Note in the United States.

== Overview ==
The album was announced in a press release, which called it a collection of "unhurriedly elegant new Knopfler songs inspired by a wide range of subjects, including his early days in Deptford with Dire Straits, a stray football fan lost in a strange town, the compulsion of a musician hitching home through the snow, and a man out of time in his local greasy spoon." The 14 songs were also called "slow and elegant".

Musicians who play on the album include Jim Cox and Guy Fletcher on keyboards, Nigel Hitchcock on saxophone, Glenn Worf on bass guitar, Danny Cummings on percussion and Ian Thomas on drums. Imelda May also provides backing vocals.

A music video for the first single, "Good on You Son", was released in September.

== Release ==
Down the Road Wherever was made available in a variety of formats, including on CD, 2×LP and in a box set; the box set includes the preceding two formats as well as a 12-inch EP including four extra tracks. The deluxe CD inserts two bonus tracks before the final standard edition track, "Matchstick Man". Lyrics for the 20th song, "Back in the Day", were released online and printed in the 2019 tourbook but the song was not released at the time. It finally saw the light of day in 2022 on the box set The Studio Albums 2009-2018, along with another unreleased song from the same sessions, "Precious Voice From Heaven".

== Track listing ==
Standard edition CD
No.	Title	Length
1.	"Trapper Man"	6:00
2.	"Back on the Dance Floor"	5:30
3.	"Nobody’s Child"	4:16
4.	"Just a Boy Away from Home"	5:12
5.	"When You Leave"	4:12
6.	"Good on You Son"	5:37
7.	"My Bacon Roll"	5:35
8.	"Nobody Does That"	5:15
9.	"Drovers' Road" (not on double LP)	5:05
10.	"One Song at a Time"	6:17
11.	"Floating Away"	5:02
12.	"Slow Learner"	4:34
13.	"Heavy Up"	6:00
14.	"Matchstick Man"	2:52
Total length:		71:27

Deluxe edition CD (incl. 2 bonus tracks)
No.	Title	Length
1.	"Trapper Man"	6:00
2.	"Back on the Dance Floor"	5:30
3.	"Nobody’s Child"	4:16
4.	"Just a Boy Away from Home"	5:12
5.	"When You Leave"	4:12
6.	"Good on You Son"	5:37
7.	"My Bacon Roll"	5:35
8.	"Nobody Does That"	5:15
9.	"Drovers' Road"	5:05
10.	"One Song at a Time"	6:17
11.	"Floating Away"	5:02
12.	"Slow Learner"	4:34
13.	"Heavy Up"	6:00
14.	"Every Heart in the Room" (only on CD)	4:30
15.	"Rear View Mirror" (only on CD)	2:29
16.	"Matchstick Man"	2:52
Total length:		78:26

Double Gatefold (12") LP (excl. one track)
No.	Title	Length
1.	"Trapper Man" (A1)	6:00
2.	"Back on the Dance Floor" (A2)	5:30
3.	"Nobody’s Child" (A3)	4:16
4.	"Nobody Does That" (B1)	5:15
5.	"Good on You Son" (B2)	5:37
6.	"Floating Away" (B3)	5:02
7.	"One Song at a Time" (C1)	6:17
8.	"Heavy Up" (C2)	6:00
9.	"Slow Learner" (C3)	4:34
10.	"Just a Boy Away from Home" (D1)	5:12
11.	"My Bacon Roll" (D2)	5:35
12.	"When You Leave" (D3)	4:12
13.	"Matchstick Man" (D4)	2:52
Total length:		66:22

Box Set Deluxe edition Bonus 4 Track (12") LP
No.	Title	Length
1.	"Drovers' Road" (A1)	5:05
2.	"Don't Suck Me In" (A2) (only on LP)	5:17
3.	"Sky and Water" (B1) (only on LP)	4:32
4.	"Pale Imitation" (B2 (only on LP))	3:59
Total length:		18:53

Box Set Deluxe edition (17-track) Triple Gatefold (12") LP
No.	Title	Length
Total length:		85:15

The whole 19 tracks from either Deluxe edition CD or Box Set Deluxe edition Triple Gatefold LP
No.	Title	Length
1.	"Trapper Man"	6:00
2.	"Back on the Dance Floor"	5:30
3.	"Nobody’s Child"	4:16
4.	"Just a Boy Away from Home"	5:12
5.	"When You Leave"	4:12
6.	"Good on You Son"	5:37
7.	"My Bacon Roll"	5:35
8.	"Nobody Does That"	5:15
9.	"Drovers' Road"	5:05
10.	"One Song at a Time"	6:17
11.	"Floating Away"	5:02
12.	"Slow Learner"	4:34
13.	"Heavy Up"	6:00
14.	"Every Heart in the Room" (only on CD)	4:30
15.	"Rear View Mirror" (only on CD)	2:29
16.	"Matchstick Man"	2:52
17.	"Don't Suck Me In" (only on LP)	5:17
18.	"Sky and Water" (only on LP)	4:32
19.	"Pale Imitation" (only on LP)	3:59
Total length:		92:14

Note: The CD version of The Studio Albums 2009-2018 includes the LP running order on CD, and all bonus tracks (including "Drovers' Road") are relegated to the bonus disc "Back In The Day". The LP version of the same box set adds "Drovers' Road", "Every Heart in the Room", "Don't Suck Me In" and "Sky and Water" to the original LP tracklist while "Rear View Mirror" and "Pale Imitation" are kept to the bonus LP.

All songs are written by Mark Knopfler except "Just a Boy Away from Home" which in addition to Knopfler's songwriting contains elements of "You'll Never Walk Alone" by Richard Rodgers and Oscar Hammerstein.

== Personnel ==
Musicians

- Mark Knopfler – guitars, vocals
- Richard Bennett – guitars
- Glenn Worf – upright and electric bass
- Guy Fletcher – keyboards
- Jim Cox – keyboards
- Ian Thomas – drums
- Danny Cummings – percussion

Additional musicians

- Lance Ellington – background vocalist
- Beverley Skeete – background vocalist
- Katie Kissoon – background vocalist
- Kris Drever - background vocalist
- Imelda May - background vocalist
- Nigel Hitchcock – tenor saxophone
- Tom Walsh – trumpet
- Trevor Mires – trombone
- John McCusker – fiddle
- Mike McGoldrick – whistle
- Robbie McIntosh – guitar

Production

- Engineers: Guy Fletcher, Martin Hollis
- Assistant engineers: Rowan McIntosh, Jason Elliot, Andy Cook, Poppy Kavanagh, Josh Tyrell

== Charts ==
=== Weekly charts ===
Chart (2018)	Peak position
Australian Albums (ARIA)	14
Austrian Albums (Ö3 Austria)	4
Belgian Albums (Ultratop Flanders)	7
Belgian Albums (Ultratop Wallonia)	10
Canadian Albums (Billboard)	6
Czech Albums (ČNS IFPI)	10
Danish Albums (Hitlisten)	3
Dutch Albums (Album Top 100)	5
Finnish Albums (Suomen virallinen lista)	3
French Albums (SNEP)	17
German Albums (Offizielle Top 100)	3
Hungarian Albums (MAHASZ)	15
Irish Albums (IRMA)	20
Italian Albums (FIMI)	7
New Zealand Albums (RMNZ)	10
Norwegian Albums (VG-lista)	1
Polish Albums (ZPAV)	7
Scottish Albums (OCC)	11
Spanish Albums (PROMUSICAE)	6
Swedish Albums (Sverigetopplistan)	2
Swiss Albums (Schweizer Hitparade)	1
UK Albums (OCC)	17
US Billboard 200	15
US Top Rock Albums (Billboard)	3

=== Year-end charts ===
Chart (2018)	Position
Austrian Albums (Ö3 Austria)	70
Belgian Albums (Ultratop Flanders)	158
Belgian Albums (Ultratop Wallonia)	129
German Albums (Offizielle Top 100)	43
Spanish Albums (PROMUSICAE)	85
Swiss Albums (Schweizer Hitparade)	39

Chart (2019)	Position
Swiss Albums (Schweizer Hitparade)	62
US Top Rock Albums (Billboard)	98

== Certifications ==
Region	Certification	Certified units/sales
Germany (BVMI)	Gold	100,000^{‡}
Poland (ZPAV)	Gold	10,000^{‡}
^{‡} Sales+streaming figures based on certification alone.
