= Kill to Get Crimson =

Studio album by Mark Knopfler
- Released: 17 September 2007
- Recorded: January–March 2007
- Studios: British Grove Studios, Chiswick, West London
- Genres: Roots rock, folk rock
- Length: 56:55
- Labels: Mercury; Warner Bros. (US)
- Producers: Mark Knopfler; Chuck Ainlay; Guy Fletcher

Mark Knopfler chronology
Real Live Roadrunning (2006)	Kill to Get Crimson (2007)	Get Lucky (2009)

Professional ratings
Review scores
Source	Rating
AllMusic	3/5 stars
Okayplayer	3/5 stars
Rolling Stone	4/5 stars

Kill to Get Crimson is the fifth solo studio album by British singer-songwriter and guitarist Mark Knopfler, released on 17 September 2007 by Mercury Records internationally and by Warner Bros. Records in the United States. The album's title comes from a line in the song "Let It All Go." The album cover image is taken from the painting Four Lambrettas and Three Portraits of Janet Churchman by John Bratby, painted in 1958. The first singles from the album were "True Love Will Never Fade" in Europe and "Punish The Monkey" in North America. The album debuted at number 26 on the US Billboard 200 chart, selling about 23,000 copies in its first week. The Kill to Get Crimson Tour promoting the album started on 29 March 2008 in Amsterdam, Netherlands and ended on 31 July 2008 in Miami, Florida. The album was released on CD, CD/DVD, double vinyl LP, and a Deluxe Set of 180g vinyl LP and CD.

The album track "Secondary Waltz" dates from the early '80s, and was mentioned by Knopfler in an interview in 1985.

== Touring ==
Knopfler supported the release of Kill to Get Crimson with the Kill to Get Crimson Tour of Europe and North America, which started on 29 March 2008 in Amsterdam, and included 94 concerts in 88 cities, ending on 31 July 2008 in Miami, Florida. The tour lineup included Mark Knopfler (guitars, vocals), Richard Bennett (guitars), Danny Cummings (drums), Guy Fletcher (keyboards), Matt Rollings (keyboards), Glenn Worf (bass) and John McCusker (fiddle, cittern). The tour included a six-night run at the Royal Albert Hall in London, with Bap Kennedy as the supporting act. Jesca Hoop was the opening act for the North America leg of the tour.

== Track listing ==
All songs written by Mark Knopfler.

No.	Title	Length
1.	"True Love Will Never Fade"	4:21
2.	"The Scaffolder's Wife"	3:52
3.	"The Fizzy And The Still"	4:07
4.	"Heart Full Of Holes"	6:36
5.	"We Can Get Wild"	4:17
6.	"Secondary Waltz"	3:43
7.	"Punish The Monkey"	4:36
8.	"Let It All Go"	5:17
9.	"Behind With The Rent"	4:46
10.	"The Fish And The Bird"	3:45
11.	"Madame Geneva's"	3:59
12.	"In The Sky"	7:29
Total length:		56:55

== Personnel ==
- Mark Knopfler – vocals, guitar, producer
- Guy Fletcher – keyboards, producer, engineer
- Glenn Worf – bass guitar, string bass
- Danny Cummings – drums, percussion
- Richard Bennett – guitars
- Ian Lowthian – accordion
- Frank Ricotti – vibraphone
- John McCusker – violin, cittern
- Steve Sidwell – trumpet
- Chris White – flute, saxophone, clarinet

Production

- Chuck Ainlay – producer, engineer
- Rich Cooper – assistant engineer
- Bob Ludwig – mastering
- John Bratby – cover image
- Fabio Lovino – photography

== Charts ==
=== Weekly charts ===
Chart (2007)	Peak position
Australian Albums (ARIA)	41
Austrian Albums (Ö3 Austria)	10
Belgian Albums (Ultratop Flanders)	11
Belgian Albums (Ultratop Wallonia)	12
Danish Albums (Hitlisten)	5
Dutch Albums (Album Top 100)	4
Finnish Albums (Suomen virallinen lista)	15
French Albums (SNEP)	9
German Albums (Offizielle Top 100)	2
Hungarian Albums (MAHASZ)	16
Irish Albums (IRMA)	37
Italian Albums (FIMI)	2
Norwegian Albums (VG-lista)	2
Portuguese Albums (AFP)	29
Scottish Albums (Official Charts)	12
Spanish Albums (Promusicae)	9
Swedish Albums (Sverigetopplistan)	4
Swiss Albums (Schweizer Hitparade)	3
UK Albums (Official Charts)	9
US Billboard 200	26
US Top Rock Albums (Billboard)	9

=== Year-end charts ===
Chart (2007)	Position
Dutch Albums (Album Top 100)	61
German Albums (Offizielle Top 100)	75
Swiss Albums (Schweizer Hitparade)	58

== Certifications ==
Region	Certification	Certified units/sales
Denmark (IFPI Danmark)	Gold	15,000^{^}
Germany (BVMI)	Gold	100,000^{‡}
Poland (ZPAV)	Gold	10,000^{*}
Russia (NFPF)	Gold	10,000^{*}
Switzerland (IFPI Switzerland)	Gold	15,000^{^}
United Kingdom (BPI)	Silver	60,000^{*}
^{*} Sales figures based on certification alone.^{^} Shipments figures based on certification alone.^{‡} Sales+streaming figures based on certification alone.
