= Metroland (soundtrack) =

Soundtrack album by Mark Knopfler
- Released: 23 March 1999
- Recorded: 1998–1999
- Studio: Sarm West, London
- Genre: Film music, jazz, rock
- Length: 44:37
- Label: Vertigo; Warner Bros. (USA)
- Producer: Mark Knopfler, Chuck Ainlay

Mark Knopfler chronology
| Wag the Dog (1998) | Metroland (1999) | Sailing to Philadelphia (2000) |

Metroland is the seventh soundtrack album by British singer-songwriter and guitarist Mark Knopfler, released on 23 March 1999 by Vertigo Records internationally and Warner Bros. Records in the United States. The album contains music composed for the 1997 film Metroland, directed by Philip Saville.

== Composition ==
The instrumental tracks, specifically composed and recorded for the film by Knopfler, effectively help to create the mood and highlight the distinct personalities of the principal characters, with the soundtrack changing the atmosphere as the film flips back and forth between Paris in the early '60s and suburban London in 1977. Parisian flavour is augmented by the music of Françoise Hardy, Django Reinhardt and Quintette du Hot Club de France, with some late-70s classics from The Stranglers, Dire Straits, Hot Chocolate and Elvis Costello that are appropriate for that the period.

In the lyrics of "Metroland", the only song he wrote for the movie, Knopfler says "I've danced in the rain and I've been Django", so it is entirely appropriate that music by Django Reinhardt should also be on the soundtrack. The song is illustrative of Knopfler's art: it begins with a rising four-note theme on flugelhorn which parallels the hymn Jerusalem, the quintessential anthem of Englishness, but with a vibraphone accompaniment recalling Anglo-French jazz of the '50s. The same theme has been used throughout the movie as the protagonist's signature. The song then moves from a conventional verse backed by acoustic guitars into an electric guitar and organ-driven rock song, sweeping the listener along in its accelerating rush. Knopfler skillfully manipulates the dynamics to take the listener along an emotional journey, mimicking the film's protagonist's journey from detached observer to painfully involved main character.

== Critical reception ==
Professional ratings
Review scores
| Source | Rating |
|---|---|
| AllMusic | 3/5 stars |

The soundtrack generated generally positive reviews. In his review for AllMusic, Chuck Donkers gave the album three out of five stars, noting that Knopfler's music "nicely evokes the picture's wistful, nostalgic atmosphere." In his review in the Los Angeles Times, Kevin Thomas noted Knopfler's "evocative score". In her review for The New York Times, Janet Maslin noted that one of the film's "strongest assets" was Knopfler's "fine, expressive score". In her review in Boxoffice Magazine, Susan Green wrote, "This is a thoroughly satisfying little film with an exquisite Mark Knopfler score." In her review for iF Magazine, Etana Jacobson wrote that "Mark Knopfler's quirky Franco-Brit score adds without distracting." In his review for KillerMovies, Scott Renshaw wrote, "There's some nice atmosphere to Metroland, particularly from Mark Knopfler's silky score."

== Track listing ==
All music was written and performed by Mark Knopfler, except where indicated.

| No. | Title | Writer(s) | Length |
|---|---|---|---|
| 1. | "Metroland Theme" | | 2:27 |
| 2. | "Annick" | | 3:01 |
| 3. | "Tous les garçons et les filles" (Françoise Hardy) | Françoise Hardy, Roger Samyn | 3:06 |
| 4. | "Brats" | | 2:39 |
| 5. | "Blues Clair" (Django Reinhardt) | Django Reinhardt | 3:01 |
| 6. | "Down Day" | | 1:51 |
| 7. | "A Walk in Paris" | | 1:36 |
| 8. | "She's Gone" | | 1:28 |
| 9. | "Minor Swing" (Quintette du Hot Club de France) | Django Reinhardt, Stéphane Grappelli | 3:13 |
| 10. | "Peaches" (The Stranglers) | The Stranglers | 4:05 |
| 11. | "Sultans of Swing" (Dire Straits) | | 5:45 |
| 12. | "So You Win Again" (Hot Chocolate) | Russ Ballard | 4:22 |
| 13. | "Alison" (Elvis Costello) | Elvis Costello | 3:22 |
| 14. | "Metroland" | | 4:41 |
| Total length: | | | 44:37 |

== Personnel ==
Music (tracks 1, 2, 4, 6–8, 14 only)

- Mark Knopfler – guitars, vocals
- Richard Bennett – guitars
- Jim Cox – piano, Hammond organ
- Guy Fletcher – keyboards
- Chris White – saxophones, flute
- Steve Sidwell – trumpet, flugelhorn
- Glenn Worf – bass
- Chad Cromwell – drums

Production

- Mark Knopfler – producer
- Chuck Ainlay – producer
- Andrew Gallimore – assistant producer
- Denny Purcell – mastering at Georgetown Masters in Nashville
- Jonathan Russell – mastering assistant
- Don Cobb – digital editing
- Rick Lecoat – design
- Mark Leialoha – photography (Mark Knopfler)
- Peter Mountain – photography (film stills)
