= All the Roadrunning =

Studio album by Mark Knopfler and Emmylou Harris
- Released: 24 April 2006
- Recorded: 1998, 2002, 2004
- Genres: Country rock; Americana; country folk
- Length: 50:29
- Labels: Mercury, Universal, Warner Bros.
- Producers: Mark Knopfler, Chuck Ainlay

Mark Knopfler chronology
Private Investigations (2005)	All the Roadrunning (2006)	Real Live Roadrunning (2006)

Emmylou Harris chronology
The Very Best of Emmylou Harris: Heartaches & Highways (2005)	All the Roadrunning (2006)	Real Live Roadrunning (2006)

All the Roadrunning is a collaboration between British singer-songwriter and guitarist Mark Knopfler and American singer-songwriter Emmylou Harris, released on 24 April 2006 by Mercury Records and Universal Music internationally, and by Warner Bros. Records in the United States. The album received favorable reviews, and reached the number one position on album charts in Denmark, Norway, and Switzerland. The album peaked at number eight in the United Kingdom, and number 17 on the Billboard 200 in the United States. The title track, which actually was released the year before as a new track on the compilation album Private Investigations, was released as a single and reached number 8 in the UK.

"This Is Us" was released as the first single, followed by "Beachcombing". The album was the result of a longtime collaboration between the two artists. Over the course of seven years, the songs were recorded by the pair with minimal information released about the project. A follow-up live album, Real Live Roadrunning, was released following All the Roadrunning Tour.

== Background ==
Mark Knopfler and Emmylou Harris have had long histories of collaborating with and supporting other artists. In addition to 23 solo albums and two successful collaborative albums with Dolly Parton and Linda Ronstadt, Harris has recorded backing and duet vocals with many of the significant recording artists of her generation, including The Band, John Denver, Bob Dylan, Gram Parsons, Townes Van Zandt, Tammy Wynette and Neil Young. Knopfler had also been involved in a number of collaborative projects, recording duets with such artists as Van Morrison and James Taylor, and contributing guitar tracks to numerous recordings by other artists, including The Chieftains, Eric Clapton, Kris Kristofferson, Sonny Landreth, Kate & Anna McGarrigle, Sting, Tina Turner, Steely Dan, and Jimmy Webb. Both shared a love of country music and an admiration for one of country music's guitar masters, Chet Atkins. In 1990, Atkins and Knopfler recorded a collaborative album Neck and Neck, but their friendship went back even further. Knopfler and Harris first met while appearing on a Chet Atkins television special in 1987. They stayed in touch, and about ten years later in Nashville, Knopfler played a few of his songs for Harris, and the idea to record together emerged.

== Recording ==
All the Roadrunning was recorded sporadically over a seven-year period. Two of its tracks, the Cajun-style "Red Staggerwing" and the acoustic ballad "Donkey Town", were originally planned to be included in Knopfler's 2000 solo album Sailing to Philadelphia. On Thanksgiving evening in 1998, at a recording session in Nashville, Knopfler and Harris ran through the two songs with Harris adding her vocals. The session sparked the idea for a collaborative album of duets. Harris later recalled, "When you combine two unique voices it creates a third, phantom voice.... I love the third voice that Mark and I create. We noticed right away that our voices blended pretty effortlessly." Further recording sessions took place in 2002 and 2004, with the pair recording songs from the ground up, supported by some of the best Nashville session players. Their duets album was interrupted by their individual solo projects—Harris's Stumble into Grace in 2003 and Knopfler's Shangri-La in 2004—and their supporting tours and promotional activities.

== Composition ==
"If This Is Goodbye" is based on the last telephone calls to loved ones from the passengers of United Airlines Flight 93, which crashed in Pennsylvania on September 11, 2001, after being hijacked by terrorists.

== Touring ==
Knopfler and Harris supported the release of All the Roadrunning with the All the Roadrunning Tour of Europe and North America, which started on 26 May 2006 in Brussels, Belgium, and included 23 concerts in 23 cities, ending in Berkeley, California, on 30 June 2006. The tour lineup included Mark Knopfler (guitar, vocals), Emmylou Harris (guitar, vocals), Guy Fletcher (keyboards), Richard Bennett (guitar), Stuart Duncan (fiddle, mandolin), Matt Rollings (keyboards), Glenn Worf (bass), and Danny Cummings (drums). The concert on 28 June 2006 at the Gibson Amphitheatre in Los Angeles was recorded and released as a live album and DVD, Real Live Roadrunning, on 14 November 2006 by Mercury Records and Universal Music internationally, and by Warner Bros. Records in the United States.

== Critical response ==
Professional ratings
Aggregate scores
Source	Rating
Metacritic	63/100
Review scores
Source	Rating
AllMusic	3.5/5 stars
Entertainment Weekly	B−
Music Box	4/5 stars
Rolling Stone	3/5 stars
The Telegraph	Positive
Winnipeg Sun	4/5 stars

In his review for the Winnipeg Sun, Darryl Sterdan gave the album four out of five stars, calling the collaboration a "match made in heaven". Sterdan continued:

At first blush, you'd think Mark Knopfler's Dylanesque croak and Emmylou Harris's angelic tones would be a beauty-and-the-beast scenario. But we are glad to report this decidedly odd couple make some seriously beautiful music together on All the Roadrunning. Granted, this is nothing new for Emmylou, who has partnered with virtually every important roots and country artist of the last 30 years and never failed to make them shine just a little brighter. But the bulk of the credit really here has to go to Knopfler. He's the dominant force on the disc, acting as co-producer and penning all but one of these elegantly rootsy songs.

Sterdan praised Knopfler's songwriting on the album, especially "This is Us", "Right Now", and the "Celtic-tinged bluegrass" of "Red Staggerwing". Sterdan also noted Knopfler's production, approaching the project with a lighter touch than on his past projects, and wisely reining in his signature guitar work enough to highlight Harris' singing.

In his review for The Telegraph, Neil McCormick wrote that Knopfler and Harris recorded a "remarkable new album" that is a "collection of rich, mature songs that reflect their combined life experiences", and that is "one of the best albums of both their careers".

In his review for Entertainment Weekly, Josh Tyrangiel gave the album a B− score, writing that the two artists "seem oddly matched" and that Knopfler's guitarwork tends to overwhelm Harris' vocals.

== Track listing ==
All songs were written by Mark Knopfler, except where indicated.

No.	Title	Writer(s)	Length
1.	"Beachcombing"		4:14
2.	"I Dug Up a Diamond"		3:38
3.	"This Is Us"		4:39
4.	"Red Staggerwing"		3:03
5.	"Rollin' On"		4:14
6.	"Love and Happiness"	Emmylou Harris, Kimmie Rhodes	4:22
7.	"Right Now"		3:33
8.	"Donkey Town"		5:42
9.	"Belle Starr"	Emmylou Harris	3:06
10.	"Beyond My Wildest Dreams"		4:25
11.	"All the Roadrunning"		4:49
12.	"If This Is Goodbye"		4:44
Total length:			50:29

== Personnel ==
Music

- Mark Knopfler – vocals, guitar
- Emmylou Harris – vocals, acoustic guitar (5,9)
- Richard Bennett – guitar
- Jim Cox – keyboards
- Guy Fletcher – keyboards
- Dan Dugmore – acoustic guitar (6,12), pedal steel guitar (5,10), six-string bass (9)
- Paul Franklin – pedal steel guitar (3)
- Stuart Duncan – fiddle (4), mandolin
- Steve Conn – accordion (4)
- Billy Ware – triangle (4)
- Glenn Worf – bass
- Chad Cromwell – drums
- Danny Cummings – drums
- Jim Horn and The Memphis Horns – horns (12)

Production

- Mark Knopfler – producer
- Chuck Ainlay – producer, recording engineer, mixing
- Guy Fletcher – recording engineer
- Mark Kapps – recording engineer (horns)
- John Saylor – assistant recording engineer
- Mark Ralston – assistant recording engineer
- Rupert Coulson – mixing assistant
- Graham Meek – technical support
- Maria Verel – hair and makeup for Ms. Harris
- Fabio Iovino – photography

== Charts ==
=== Weekly charts ===
Chart (2006)	Peak position
Australian Albums (ARIA)	41
Austrian Albums (Ö3 Austria)	8
Belgian Albums (Ultratop Flanders)	5
Belgian Albums (Ultratop Wallonia)	3
Danish Albums (Hitlisten)	1
Dutch Albums (Album Top 100)	3
Finnish Albums (Suomen virallinen lista)	22
French Albums (SNEP)	17
German Albums (Offizielle Top 100)	3
Irish Albums (IRMA)	25
Italian Albums (FIMI)	3
New Zealand Albums (RMNZ)	19
Norwegian Albums (VG-lista)	1
Poland Albums Chart	19
Scottish Albums (Official Charts)	6
Spanish Albums (Promusicae)	9
Swedish Albums (Sverigetopplistan)	2
Swiss Albums (Schweizer Hitparade)	1
UK Albums (Official Charts)	8
US Billboard 200	17

=== Year-end charts ===
Chart (2006)	Position
Belgian Albums (Ultratop Flanders)	65
Belgian Albums (Ultratop Wallonia)	64
Dutch Albums (Album Top 100)	32
French Albums (SNEP)	183
German Albums (Offizielle Top 100)	47
Swedish Albums (Sverigetopplistan)	57
Swiss Albums (Schweizer Hitparade)	54
UK Albums (OCC)	170
US Billboard 200	195

== Certifications ==
Region	Certification	Certified units/sales
Germany (BVMI)	Gold	100,000^{^}
Norway (IFPI Norway)	Platinum	20,000^{*}
Switzerland (IFPI Switzerland)	Gold	15,000^{^}
United Kingdom (BPI)	Gold	100,000^{^}
^{*} Sales figures based on certification alone.^{^} Shipments figures based on certification alone.
