= Real Live Roadrunning =

2006 collaborative live album by Mark Knopfler and Emmylou Harris

Live album by Mark Knopfler and Emmylou Harris
- Released: 14 November 2006
- Recorded: 28 June 2006
- Venues: Gibson Amphitheatre, Los Angeles
- Genres: Rock, country rock
- Length: 75:02
- Labels: Mercury, Universal Music; Warner Bros. (USA)
- Producer: Guy Fletcher

Mark Knopfler chronology
All the Roadrunning (2006)	Real Live Roadrunning (2006)	Kill to Get Crimson (2007)

Emmylou Harris chronology
All the Roadrunning (2006)	Real Live Roadrunning (2006)	Songbird: Rare Tracks and Forgotten Gems (2007)

Real Live Roadrunning is a collaborative live album by British singer-songwriter and guitarist Mark Knopfler and American singer-songwriter Emmylou Harris, released on 14 November 2006 by Mercury Records and Universal Music internationally, and by Warner Bros. Records in the United States. The album was recorded live on 28 June 2006 at the Gibson Amphitheatre in Los Angeles, at the end of their summer tour in support of their critically acclaimed album, All the Roadrunning. Real Live Roadrunning was released as a combined CD/DVD.

== Artwork ==
The album cover is the second album release that prominently features Knopfler's National Style 0 Resonator guitar, the same that is featured on the cover of Brothers in Arms, the top-selling album with his former band, Dire Straits.

== Critical reception ==
Professional ratings
Review scores
Source	Rating
AllMusic	3/5 stars
The Music Box	3.5/5 stars
Rolling Stone	3/5 stars

In his review for AllMusic, James Christopher Monger gave the album three out of five stars, writing that the musicianship "is as flawless as expected, but there's not a whole lot to separate the tunes here from their studio sisters." Mongers concluded, "The accompanying DVD is a much better example of the pair's quiet dynamic, allowing both the duo and its talented band a broader spectrum on which to emit their wry tales of love, loss, and life."

In his review for The Music Box, John Metzger gave the album three and a half out of five stars, writing that although the performances are "impeccable", the set remains "a flawed affair". Metzger believed that the songs and arrangements are too similar to the studio versions on All the Roadrunning, and that the differences between the live versions and the studio versions are mostly subtle. Metzger believed that the true highlights of Real Live Roadrunning are the renewed versions of songs taken from the solo works of Knopfler and Harris, such as "Romeo and Juliet", "Speedway at Nazareth", and "Red Dirt Girl". Metzger concluded, "Understandably, in transforming their work for the stage, Knopfler and Harris were forced to swap subtlety for zeal, but as the accompanying video makes clear, they still succeeded in retaining the charming intimacy that made All the Roadrunning such a superlative collection in the first place."

== Track listing ==
All songs were written by Mark Knopfler, except where indicated.

No.	Title	Writer(s)	Length
1.	"Right Now"		4:52
2.	"Red Staggerwing"		4:53
3.	"Red Dirt Girl"	Emmylou Harris	4:31
4.	"Done with Bonaparte"		5:16
5.	"Romeo and Juliet"		9:13
6.	"All That Matters"		3:20
7.	"This Is Us"		5:18
8.	"All the Roadrunning"		5:20
9.	"Boulder to Birmingham"	Bill Danoff, Harris	3:39
10.	"Speedway at Nazareth"		6:59
11.	"So Far Away"		4:43
12.	"Our Shangri-La"		7:56
13.	"If This Is Goodbye"		4:53
14.	"Why Worry"		4:09
Total length:			75:02

== Personnel ==
Music

- Mark Knopfler – guitar, vocals
- Emmylou Harris – guitar, vocals
- Guy Fletcher – keyboards
- Richard Bennett – guitar
- Danny Cummings – drums
- Stuart Duncan – fiddle, mandolin
- Matt Rollings – keyboards
- Glenn Worf – bass

CD Production

- Guy Fletcher – producer, engineer, mixing
- Richard Cooper – assistant engineer
- Graham Meek – assistant engineer
- Bob Ludwig – mastering
- Danny Clinch – photography
- Stephan Walker – art direction
- Mark Holly – design

== DVD ==
Real Live Roadrunning

Video by Mark Knopfler and Emmylou Harris
- Released: 14 November 2006
- Recorded: Gibson Amphitheatre, Los Angeles, 28 June 2006
- Genres: Rock, country rock
- Length: 101:42
- Labels: Mercury, Universal Music; Warner Bros. (USA)
- Director: Martyn Atkins
- Producer: James Pluta

Real Live Roadrunning is a collaborative live concert DVD by British singer-songwriter and guitarist Mark Knopfler and American singer-songwriter Emmylou Harris, released on 14 November 2006 by Mercury Records and Universal Music internationally, and by Warner Bros. Records in the United States. The DVD contains a 91-minute concert, plus special features, including a documentary and interviews.

=== Track listing ===
No.	Title	Length
1.	"Right Now"
2.	"Red Staggerwing"
3.	"Red Dirt Girl" (Emmylou Harris)
4.	"I Dug Up a Diamond"
5.	"Born to Run" (Paul Kennerley)
6.	"Done with Bonaparte"
7.	"Romeo and Juliet"
8.	"Song for Sonny Liston"
9.	"Belle Starr" (Emmylou Harris)
10.	"This Is Us"
11.	"All the Roadrunning"
12.	"Boulder to Birmingham" (Bill Danoff, Emmylou Harris)
13.	"Speedway at Nazareth"
14.	"So Far Away"
15.	"Our Shangri-La"
16.	"If This Is Goodbye"
17.	"Why Worry"
Total length:		101:42

=== Personnel ===
DVD Production

- Martyn Atkins – director
- James Pluta – producer
- James Beug – executive producer
- Diarmuid Quinn – co-producer
- Peter Standish – co-producer
- David May – post production producer
- Ted Hall – post audio mixer
- Richard Riqué Patier – hair and makeup (EH)

== Charts and certifications ==
=== Albums ===
Chart (2006)	Peak
Germany Albums Chart	44
Italy Albums Chart	87

== Certifications ==
Region	Certification	Certified units/sales
Germany (BVMI)	Gold	25,000^{^}
^{^} Shipments figures based on certification alone.
