= Get Lucky (Mark Knopfler album) =

Studio album by Mark Knopfler
- Released: 14 September 2009
- Recorded: October 2008 – March 2009
- Studio: British Grove Studios, Chiswick, West London
- Genre: Roots rock, Celtic rock, folk rock
- Length: 52:03
- Label: Mercury; Reprise (USA)
- Producer: Mark Knopfler

Mark Knopfler chronology
| Kill to Get Crimson (2007) | Get Lucky (2009) | Privateering (2012) |

Get Lucky is the sixth solo studio album by British singer-songwriter and guitarist Mark Knopfler, released on 14 September 2009 in Europe by Mercury Records, and on 15 September in the United States by Reprise Records. The album was released in four formats, including CD, a Limited Edition CD/DVD Digipak, a Deluxe Edition Boxset, and a double vinyl album. Get Lucky received generally favorable reviews, and reached the top three positions on album charts in Denmark, Germany, Italy, the Netherlands, Norway, and Poland. The album peaked at number nine in the United Kingdom, and number 17 in the United States.

== Recording ==
Get Lucky was recorded at British Grove Studios in London between October 2008 and March 2009.

== Release ==
Get Lucky was released on 14 September 2009 in four formats. The Standard International version is a CD containing eleven songs. The Limited Edition version is a CD/DVD Digipak, which includes a tour of British Grove Studio conducted by Mark and Chuck Ainlay. The Deluxe Edition Boxset contains 3 engraved poker chips, 2 branded poker craps, a guitar tab for the title track, 2 180g vinyl LPs, a facsimile gig ticket, and a DVD containing 1 acoustic track performed live, a video tour of British Grove Studios with interviews, and a short 20-minute film. The Vinyl Edition version is a double vinyl LP.

== Composition ==
The song "The Car Was the One" is based on a story in The Unfair Advantage, an autobiography by race car driver Mark Donohue.

== Touring ==
Knopfler promoted the album with two tours in 2010. The North American tour started on 8 April 2010 in Seattle, Washington, and included 28 concerts in 27 cities, ending on 9 May 2010 in Albany, New York. The European tour started on 21 May 2010 in Glasgow, Scotland, and included 60 concerts in 52 cities, ending on 31 July 2010 in Ávila, Spain. The tour included a six-night run at the Royal Albert Hall in London.

== Critical reception ==
Professional ratings
Aggregate scores
| Source | Rating |
|---|---|
| Metacritic | 63/100 |
Review scores
| Source | Rating |
| AbsolutePunk | 9.5/10 stars |
| AllMusic | 3.5/5 stars |
| PopMatters | 7/10 stars |
| Rolling Stone | 4/5 stars |
| Sound & Vision | 4.5/4 stars |

Get Lucky received generally positive reviews from music critics. On the review aggregator website Metacritic, the album holds a Metascore of 63, meaning the album has received "generally favourable reviews". In his review for AllMusic, William Ruhlmann gave the album three and a half out of five stars, noting that although Glasgow-born Knopfler comes by the Celtic influence honestly, he "seems to be trying to create his own pseudo-traditional repertoire of what often sound like old folk songs." In his review for Sound & Vision, Mike Mettler gave the album four and a half out of five stars, noting that Knopfler "continues to evolve as a storyteller who's never afraid of shying away from rock theatrics to explore his considerable British roots."

In his review for PopMatters, Michael Kabran gave the album seven out of ten stars, noting that the album is "filled with sweeping strings, subtle melodies, bluesy guitar bits, and Knopfler’s usual smart lyrics." Kabran concluded, "Knopfler has created an enjoyable collection of blues shuffles, countrified ballads, and Celtic-influenced folk songs that deserves attention and, perhaps most important, deserves to stand on its own." In his review for AbsolutePunk, Thomas Nassiff gave the album a 95% rating, praising the album's "refreshing insight" and "phenomenal songwriting". In his review for Rolling Stone, Michael Tremmel gave the album four out of five stars.

== Track listing ==
All songs were written by Mark Knopfler.

| No. | Title | Length |
|---|---|---|
| 1. | "Border Reiver" | 4:35 |
| 2. | "Hard Shoulder" | 4:33 |
| 3. | "You Can't Beat the House" | 3:25 |
| 4. | "Before Gas and TV" | 5:50 |
| 5. | "Monteleone" | 3:39 |
| 6. | "Cleaning My Gun" | 4:43 |
| 7. | "The Car Was the One" | 3:55 |
| 8. | "Remembrance Day" | 5:05 |
| 9. | "Get Lucky" | 4:33 |
| 10. | "So Far from the Clyde" | 5:58 |
| 11. | "Piper to the End" | 5:47 |
| Total length: | | 52:03 |

iTunes and Amazon bonus tracks

| No. | Title | Length |
|---|---|---|
| 12. | "Early Bird" | 5:36 |
| 13. | "Time in the Sun" | 2:52 |

Deluxe Edition bonus tracks

| No. | Title | Length |
|---|---|---|
| 14. | "Pulling Down the Ride" | 2:41 |
| 15. | "Home Boy" | 3:15 |
| 16. | "Good as Gold" | 3:27 |

== Personnel ==
- Mark Knopfler – vocals, guitar
- Richard Bennett – guitar
- John McCusker – violin, cittern
- Matt Rollings – keyboards
- Guy Fletcher – keyboards, string arrangements
- Glenn Worf – bass guitar, string bass
- Danny Cummings – drums
- Phil Cunningham – accordion (1,4,10,11)
- Michael McGoldrick – flute, whistle (1,4,10,11)
- Rupert Gregson-Williams – strings conductor, French horn

Production

- Mark Knopfler – producer
- Guy Fletcher – co-producer, engineer
- Chuck Ainlay – co-producer, engineer
- Rich Cooper – assistant engineer
- Martin Hollis – assistant engineer
- Bob Ludwig – mastering at Gateway Mastering Studios in Portland, Maine

== Charts ==
=== Album charts ===
| Chart (2009) | Peak |
|---|---|
| Australia Albums Chart | 43 |
| Austria Albums Chart | 10 |
| Belgium Albums Chart (Flanders) | 17 |
| Belgium Albums Chart (Wallonia) | 8 |
| Canadian Albums Chart | 16 |
| Denmark Albums Chart | 2 |
| Dutch Albums Chart | 3 |
| European Albums Chart | 2 |
| Finland Albums Chart | 17 |
| France Albums Chart | 10 |
| Germany Albums Chart | 2 |
| Hungary Albums Chart | 13 |
| Italy Albums Chart | 2 |
| Irish Albums Chart | 25 |
| Norway Albums Chart | 1 |
| Poland Albums Chart | 3 |
| Portugal Albums Chart | 9 |
| New Zealand Albums Chart | 5 |
| Spain Albums Chart | 4 |
| Sweden Albums Chart | 6 |
| Swiss Albums Chart | 5 |
| UK Albums Chart | 9 |
| US Billboard 200 | 17 |
| US Billboard Rock Album | 5 |

=== Year-end charts ===
| Chart (2009) | Rank |
|---|---|
| Danish Albums Chart | 47 |
| Dutch Albums Chart | 62 |
| French Albums Chart | 156 |
| Germany Albums Chart | 47 |
| Italy Albums Chart | 93 |
| Swedish Albums Chart | 85 |
| Swiss Albums Chart | 98 |

== Certifications ==
| Region | Certification | Certified units/sales |
|---|---|---|
| Germany (BVMI) | Gold | 100,000^{^} |
| Italy (FIMI) | Gold | 35,000^{*} |
| Poland (ZPAV) | Gold | 10,000^{*} |
| Norway (IFPI Norway) | Platinum | 30,000^{*} |
| United Kingdom (BPI) | Silver | 60,000^{*} |
^{*} Sales figures based on certification alone.^{^} Shipments figures based on certification alone.
