= The Princess Bride (soundtrack) =

Soundtrack album by Mark Knopfler
- Released: 12 November 1987
- Recorded: 1987
- Genre: Film music, folk rock
- Length: 39:25
- Label: Vertigo; Warner Bros. (USA)
- Producer: Mark Knopfler

Mark Knopfler chronology
Comfort and Joy (1984)	The Princess Bride (1987)	Last Exit to Brooklyn (1989)

The Princess Bride is the fourth soundtrack album by British singer-songwriter and guitarist Mark Knopfler, released on 12 November 1987 by Vertigo Records internationally, and by Warner Bros. Records in the United States. The album contains music composed for the 1987 film The Princess Bride, directed by Rob Reiner. The album features the song "Storybook Love", written and performed by Willy DeVille and arranged by Mark Knopfler. In 1988, the song received an Academy Award nomination for Best Original Song.

== Background ==
In his audio commentary of the film on the Special Edition DVD, director Rob Reiner said that only Mark Knopfler of Dire Straits could create a soundtrack to capture the film's quirky yet romantic nature. Reiner was an admirer of Knopfler's work but did not know him before working on the film. He sent the script to him hoping he would agree to score the film. Knopfler agreed on one condition: that somewhere in the film Reiner would include the USS Coral Sea (CV-43) baseball cap (modified to say USS Ooral Sea) he wore as Marty DiBergi in the film This is Spinal Tap. Reiner was unable to produce the original cap, but did include a similar cap in the grandson's room. Knopfler later said he was only joking about the hat.

== Critical reception ==
Professional ratings
Review scores
Source	Rating
AllMusic	4.5/5 stars
Filmtracks	4/5 stars

In his review for AllMusic, Johnny Loftus gave the album four and a half out of five stars, praising Knopfler's ability to capture the varied dramatic elements of the film in the music.

Mark Knopfler's original music for The Princess Bride utilizes dreamy washes of synthesizers overlaid with warm acoustic instruments and hints of percussion. It's a great formula, often drifting through a gauze befitting a film that plays like a fairy tale. At the same time, songs like "Cliffs of Insanity" and "The Fireswamp and the Rodents of Unusual Size" cleverly acknowledge the movie's quirky humor even as they advance the plot with urgent notes or shimmering synth trills. "The Friends' Song"'s gently plucked acoustic guitar and whistle suggests the bardic tradition, while the main theme "Once Upon a Time...Storybook Love" is as romantic and pastoral as the film itself.

The editorial reviewer on Filmtracks gave the album four out of five stars, calling it "an important piece of late-80's film music history."

Knopfler's style, across all of his film scores, is such a distinctive extension of the instrumental backing of his pop songs that it's nearly impossible to compare it to any other film score, despite the fact that a handful have attempted to imitate it through the years. ... Performed by only two individuals (Knopfler and Guy Fletcher), the score won't blow you away with sonic depth. Instead, it steals your heart with two opening cues of sweet and romantic acoustic guitar performances. These delicately plucked cues are quite lovely, with the kind of friendly personality that renders them a regular accompaniment to wedding receptions. The wishy-washy, echoing recording of the guitar, with its soothing synthesized accompaniment, appropriately puts the listener into almost a dreamy state in these two cues (as well as "A Happy Ending"). The same phenomenon occurs with the airy keyboarding in "Morning Ride", "Friend's Song," and "Guide my Sword," which often overwhelm the soundscape with their gleaming, major-key goodness. It is film score easy listening at its easiest during much of its length.

In 1988, the song "Storybook Love", written by Willy DeVille and arranged by Mark Knopfler, received an Academy Award nomination for Best Original Song.

== Track listing ==
All music was written by Mark Knopfler, except where indicated.

No.	Title	Length
1.	"Once Upon a Time...Storybook Love"	4:00
2.	"I Will Never Love Again"	3:04
3.	"Florin Dance"	1:32
4.	"Morning Ride"	1:36
5.	"The Friends' Song"	3:02
6.	"The Cliffs of Insanity"	3:18
7.	"The Swordfight"	2:43
8.	"Guide My Sword"	5:11
9.	"The Fireswamp and the Rodents of Unusual Size"	4:47
10.	"Revenge"	3:51
11.	"A Happy Ending"	1:52
12.	"Storybook Love" (Willy DeVille)	4:24
Total length:		39:20

== Charts ==
Chart (1988)	Peak position
Australia (Kent Music Report)	87

== Personnel ==
Music

- Mark Knopfler – guitars
- Guy Fletcher – keyboards
- Willy DeVille – vocals

Production

- Mark Knopfler – producer
- Bill Schnee – mixing
- Marc De Sisto – engineer
- Bob Ludwig – mastering
- Steve Jackson – engineer, mixing ("Storybook Love")
- Deborah Feingold – photography
