= Wag the Dog (soundtrack) =

Soundtrack album by Mark Knopfler
- Released: 13 January 1998
- Recorded: AIR Studios, London, 1997
- Genre: Film music
- Length: 24:09
- Label: Vertigo; Mercury (USA)
- Producer: Mark Knopfler, Chuck Ainlay

Mark Knopfler chronology
Golden Heart (1996)	Wag the Dog (1998)	Metroland (1999)

Wag the Dog is the sixth soundtrack album by British singer-songwriter and guitarist Mark Knopfler, released on 13 January 1998 by Vertigo Records internationally, and by Mercury Records in the United States. The album contains music composed for the 1997 film Wag the Dog, directed by Barry Levinson. The film featured songs created for the fictitious campaign waged by the protagonists, including "Good Old Shoe", "The American Dream", and "The Men of the 303". These songs appear on the soundtrack album as instrumental tracks. Only the title track contains vocals.

== Critical response ==
Professional ratings
Review scores
Source	Rating
AllMusic	4/5 stars

In his review for AllMusic, Stephen Thomas Erlewine gave the album four out of five stars, calling it one of Knopfler's "best scores, alternately graceful and rootsy."

== Track listing ==
All music was written by Mark Knopfler.

No.	Title	Length
1.	"Wag the Dog"	4:44
2.	"Working on It"	3:27
3.	"In the Heartland"	2:45
4.	"An American Hero"	2:04
5.	"Just Instinct"	1:36
6.	"Stretching Out"	4:17
7.	"Drooling National"	1:53
8.	"We're Going to War"	3:23
Total length:		24:09

== Personnel ==
Music

- Mark Knopfler – guitar, vocals
- Richard Bennett – guitar
- Jim Cox – piano, Hammond organ
- Guy Fletcher – keyboards
- Glenn Worf – bass
- Chad Cromwell – drums

Production

- Mark Knopfler – producer
- Chuck Ainlay – producer
- Mark Ralston – assistant producer
- Denny Purcell – mastering at Georgetown Masters in Nashville
- Don Cobb – digital editing
- Rick Lecoat – design
- Phil Caruso – photography
- Mark Leialoha – photography
