= Cal (soundtrack) =

Soundtrack album by Mark Knopfler
- Released: 24 August 1984
- Recorded: February–March 1984 AIR Studios, London, England, United Kingdom
- Genre: Celtic music, folk, instrumental rock
- Length: 35:08
- Label: Vertigo Records
- Producer: Mark Knopfler

Mark Knopfler chronology
Local Hero (1983)	Cal (1984)	Comfort and Joy (1984)

Singles from Cal
- 1. "The Long Road (Theme From 'Cal')" Released: 14 September 1984

Cal is the second soundtrack album by British singer-songwriter and guitarist Mark Knopfler, released on 24 August 1984 by Vertigo Records. The album contains music composed for the 1984 film Cal, produced by David Puttnam and directed by Pat O'Connor. Puttnam also produced the film Local Hero (1983).

Knopfler played the track "Father And Son" on his 2013 tour as an instrumental intro to the song "Hill Farmer's Blues."

== Critical reception ==
Professional ratings
Review scores
Source	Rating
AllMusic	4.5/5 stars

In a contemporary review in The New York Times, Janet Maslin called the album "an exceptionally lovely and haunting score."

In a retrospective review for AllMusic, Steven McDonald gave the album four and a half out of five stars and called it a "quiet, reflective set of cues that eschew false dramatics in favor of supporting the story."

== Track listing ==
All music was written by Mark Knopfler.

No.	Title	Length
1.	"Irish Boy"	3:55
2.	"The Road"	2:08
3.	"Waiting for Her"	0:38
4.	"Irish Love"	2:24
5.	"A Secret Place / Where Will You Go"	1:45
6.	"Father and Son"	7:41
7.	"Meeting Under the Trees"	0:48
8.	"Potato Picking"	2:06
9.	"In a Secret Place"	1:08
10.	"Fear and Hatred"	2:18
11.	"Love and Guilt"	3:04
12.	"The Long Road"	7:13
Total length:		35:08

== Charts ==
Chart (1984/85)	Peak position
Australia (Kent Music Report)	83

== Personnel ==
Music

- Mark Knopfler – guitars
- Paul Brady – tin whistle, mandolin
- Liam O'Flynn – Uilleann pipes
- Guy Fletcher – keyboards
- John Illsley – bass
- Terry Williams – drums

Production

- Mark Knopfler – producer
- Neil Dorfsman – engineer
- Matt d'Arbanlay-Butler – assistant engineer
- Steve Jackson – assistant engineer
- John Dent – mastering at the Sound Clinic in London
- Sutton Cooper – sleeve design
- Brian Aris – photograph of Mark Knopfler
