= Guy Fletcher =

British musician (born 1960)

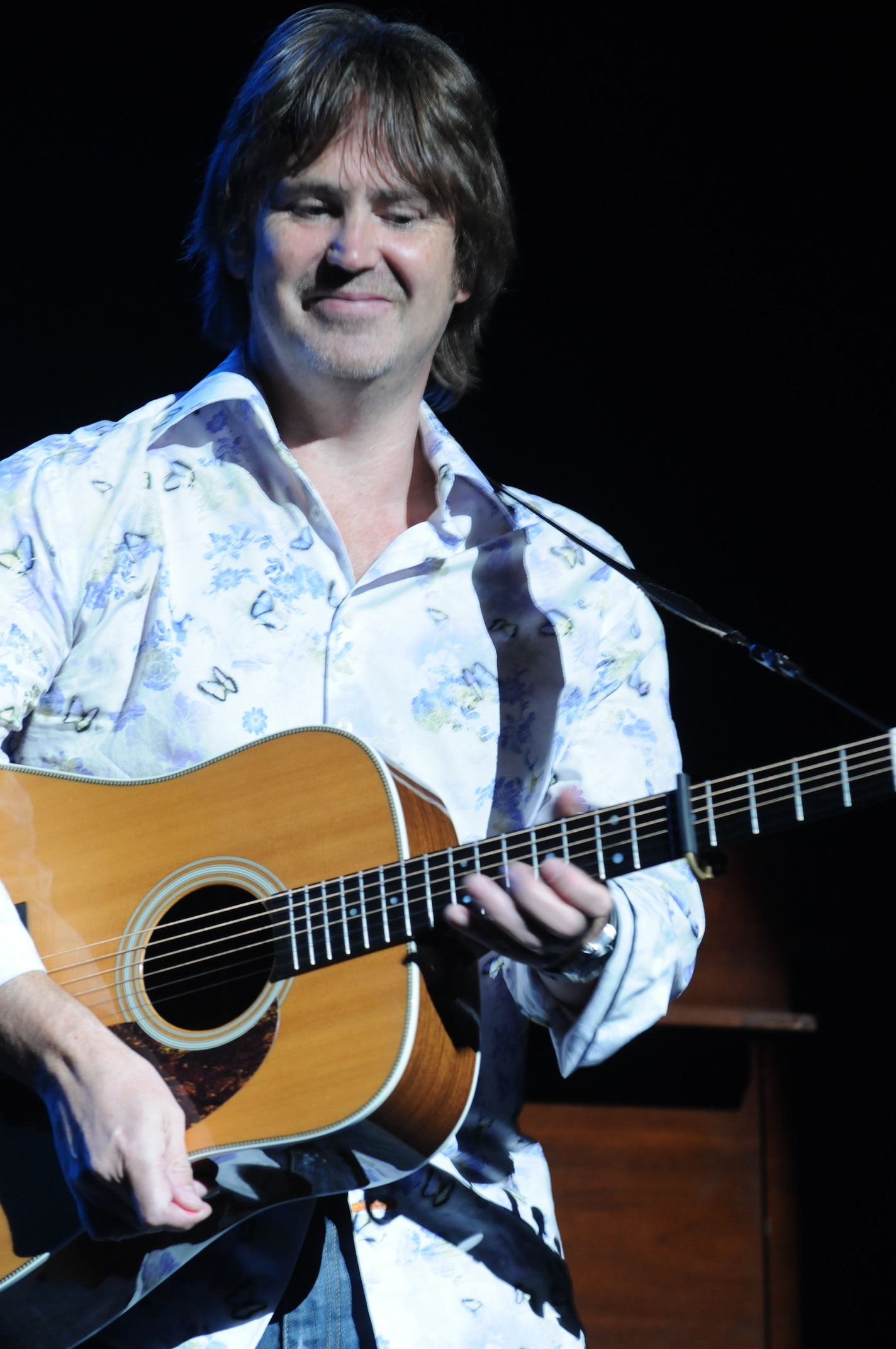
- Fletcher performing with Mark Knopfler at the NAC in Ottawa, Canada, 2008

Background information
- Born: Guy Edward Fletcher; 24 May 1960 (age 66)
- Origin: Maidstone, Kent, England
- Genres: Rock; folk
- Occupations: Musician; record producer
- Instruments: Keyboards; guitar; vocals
- Years active: 1979–present
- Label: Inamorecords
- Website: guyfletcher.co.uk

Guy Edward Fletcher (born 24 May 1960) is an English musician, best known for his position as one of the two keyboard players in the rock band Dire Straits from 1984 until the group's dissolution, and his subsequent work with Dire Straits frontman Mark Knopfler for his many solo releases. Fletcher was inducted into the Rock and Roll Hall of Fame as a member of Dire Straits in 2018.

== Biography ==
Guy Edward Fletcher was born into a musical family and is the namesake of his uncle, Guy Fletcher, who wrote several hit songs for other artists with composing partner Doug Flett. His mother Barbara was a session singer; his father Ted Fletcher, an audio designer, created a line of audio equipment named after Joe Meek with whom he had worked.

Fletcher is also the cousin of children's television presenter Justin Fletcher.

Whilst learning a trade as an audio engineer at DJM Studios in London at the age of 15, Fletcher also had a succession of his own bands and learned to play keyboards, guitars, and a variety of stringed instruments. He joined and toured with Steve Harley & Cockney Rebel in 1979 and in 1981, and with Roxy Music for their Avalon world tour during 1982 and 1983. In 1983, Fletcher was recruited by Dire Straits' lead guitarist Mark Knopfler to work on the music for the films Cal and Comfort and Joy. He joined Dire Straits as a full-time member in 1984, his first album with them being their most successful, 1985's Brothers in Arms, which put the band in a global spotlight, and he remained with the band until their 1995 disbanding.

In 1987, Fletcher co-produced Belouis Some's album Belouis Some with Gary Langan.

In 1996, Fletcher toured as part of Bryan Ferry's band on his Mamouna world tour.

In 2013, Guy produced the album Tierra by renowned flamenco artist Vicente Amigo.

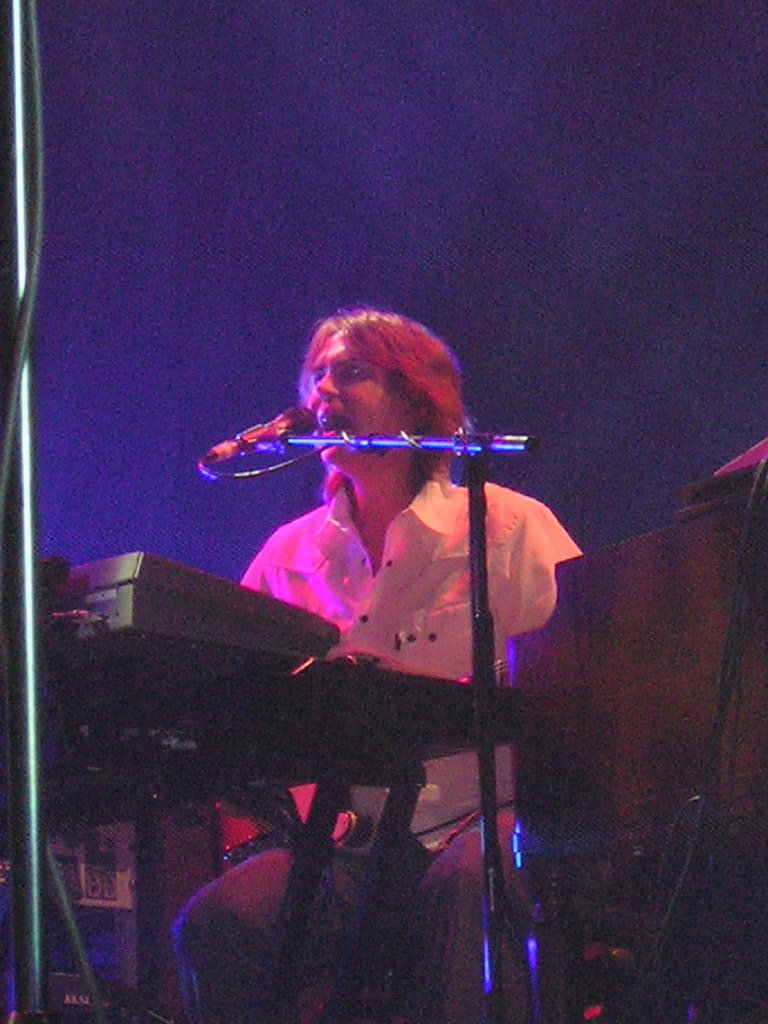
Fletcher performing in 2005

Following the disbanding of Dire Straits, Fletcher continued his association with band founder Mark Knopfler as a core member of his band after launching his solo career. In 2005, Fletcher completed a world tour promoting Knopfler's 2004 solo album, Shangri-La, and in 2006 rounded off the duets tour with Knopfler and Emmylou Harris. Fletcher co-produced and played keyboards on Knopfler's album, Get Lucky, and was again part of his subsequent world tour in 2010.

Guy Fletcher continues to collaborate with Mark Knopfler to this day. In early 2024, Knopfler assembled a supergroup, referred to as Mark Knopfler's Guitar Heroes, to record a new version of "Going Home: Theme of the Local Hero" to support the Teenage Cancer Trust and Teen Cancer America. The two-year project was entirely produced, recorded and mixed by Fletcher and was released on 15 March 2024, featuring contributions from more than sixty musicians. Fletcher also co-produced Knopfler's latest album, One Deep River, released in April 2024.

== Solo work ==
Fletcher's first solo album, Inamorata, was released on 28 January 2008. Knopfler guested as lead guitarist for two tracks, and various musicians who have been associated with Knopfler's band also made appearances.

Fletcher's second album, Stone, was released in 2009; his third, Natural Selection was released in 2010, with High Roads being released in 2016.

His latest album, Anomaly, was released on 22 April 2022.

== Discography ==
=== With Roxy Music ===
- The High Road (1983)
- Heart Still Beating (1990)

=== With Bryan Ferry ===
- Boys and Girls (1985)
- Mamouna (1994)

=== With Dire Straits ===
- Brothers in Arms (1985)
- Money for Nothing - Compilation (1988)
- On Every Street (1991)
- On the Night (1993)
- Encores (1993)
- Sultans of Swing: The Very Best of Dire Straits - Compilation (1998)
- Private Investigations: The Best of Dire Straits & Mark Knopfler - Compilation (2005)

=== With The Notting Hillbillies ===
- Missing...Presumed Having a Good Time (1990)

=== With Mark Knopfler and Chet Atkins ===
- Neck and Neck (1990)

=== With Mark Knopfler ===
- Golden Heart – (1996)
- Sailing to Philadelphia (2000)
- The Ragpicker's Dream (2002)
- Shangri-La (2004)
- Kill to Get Crimson (2007)
- Get Lucky (2009)
- Privateering (2012)
- Tracker (2015)
- Down the Road Wherever (2018)
- One Deep River (2024)

=== With Mark Knopfler & Emmylou Harris ===
- All the Roadrunning (2006)
- Real Live Roadrunning (2006)

=== With Blues Club ===
- Rollin' & Tumblin' (Volume 1) (2011)

=== Soundtrack albums ===
- Cal (1984)
- Comfort and Joy (1984)
- The Princess Bride (1987)
- Last Exit to Brooklyn (1989)
- Wag the Dog (1998)
- Metroland (1999)
- A Shot at Glory (2002)
- Altamira (2016)

=== Additional work ===
- Aztec Camera, Knife (1984)
- Mick Jagger, She's the Boss (1985)
- Tina Turner, Break Every Rule (1986)
- Minako Honda, Cancel (1986)
- Ben E. King, Save the Last Dance for Me (1987)
- Randy Newman, Land of Dreams (1988)
- Heather Nova, Siren (1998)

=== Solo ===
- Inamorata (28 January 2008)
- Stone (16 October 2009)
- Natural Selection (24 May 2010)
- High Roads (2016)
- Anomaly (2022)
