= Altamira (soundtrack) =

Soundtrack album by Mark Knopfler and Evelyn Glennie
- Released: 1 April 2016
- Recorded: 2016
- Genre: Film music, Celtic music
- Length: 25:52
- Label: Virgin EMI
- Producer: Mark Knopfler; Guy Fletcher

Mark Knopfler and Evelyn Glennie chronology
Tracker (2015)	Altamira (2016)	Down the Road Wherever (2018)

Altamira is the ninth soundtrack album by guitarist Mark Knopfler, and the first with percussionist Evelyn Glennie, released on 1 April 2016 for electronic download via iTunes and Amazon.com, and was released on CD 22 April 2016 on Virgin EMI Records. The album contains music composed for the 2016 film Altamira, directed by Hugh Hudson. The film is a drama about the discovery of the Cave of Altamira starring Antonio Banderas and Rupert Everett.

== Track listing ==
All music was written by Mark Knopfler, except where indicated.

No.	Title	Writer(s)	Length
1.	"Altamira"		2:59
2.	"Maria"		3:33
3.	"Dream of the Bison"	Evelyn Glennie	2:52
4.	"By the Grave"		2:00
5.	"Onward"		2:01
6.	"Marcelino's Despair"		2:27
7.	"Farewell to the Bison"	Evelyn Glennie	2:21
8.	"This Is Science"		1:59
9.	"Glory of the Cave"		2:07
10.	"Farewell to Altamira"		3:34
Total length:			25:52

== Personnel ==
=== Music ===
- Caroline Dale – cello
- Michael McGoldrick – flute
- Mark Knopfler – guitar
- Guy Fletcher – harmonium, keyboards
- Christine Pendrill – horn
- Evelyn Glennie – percussion and marimba

=== Production ===
- Mark Knopfler – producer
- Guy Fletcher – producer, recording supervisor
- Perry Montague-Mason – string arranger
- Rupert Gregson-Williams – vocal arranger

== Charts ==
Chart (2016)	Peak position
Belgian Albums (Ultratop Flanders)	53
Belgian Albums (Ultratop Wallonia)	68
Italian Compilation Albums (FIMI)	7
Dutch Albums (Album Top 100)	74
Polish Albums (ZPAV)	37
Spanish Albums (PROMUSICAE)	78
Swiss Albums (Schweizer Hitparade)	36
