= Comfort and Joy (soundtrack) =

Soundtrack album by Mark Knopfler
- Released: 27 July 1984
- Recorded: AIR Studios, London, March 1984
- Genre: Pop, jazz
- Length: 11:30
- Label: Vertigo
- Producer: Mark Knopfler

Mark Knopfler chronology
Cal (1984)	Comfort and Joy (1984)	The Princess Bride (1987)

Comfort and Joy is the third soundtrack album by British singer-songwriter and guitarist Mark Knopfler, released in 1984 by Vertigo Records. The album contains music composed for the 1984 film Comfort and Joy, written and directed by Bill Forsyth.

== Composition ==
Although the album consists of only three original pieces written for the film, additional songs from the Dire Straits album Love over Gold were used throughout the film. According to a review of the film by Philip Gillett, director Forsyth once acknowledged in an interview that he was "trying to mirror the tone" of the album by featuring the tracks "Telegraph Road" and "Private Investigations". Dialogue in the film also makes reference to the band and song lyrics. After the main character Allan "Dicky" Bird's car has been vandalised, a colleague quips, "I hear the seven deadly sins and the terrible twins came to call on you"—a direct quote from the song "It Never Rains". Bird responds, "Dire Straits!"

== Track listing ==
All songs were written by Mark Knopfler.

Side one

1. "Comfort" (Theme from Comfort and Joy) – 2:28
2. "Joy" – 4:20

Side two

1. "A Fistful of Ice-Cream" – 4:42

== Personnel ==
Music

- Mark Knopfler – guitars and mandolin
- Chris White – saxophone
- Guy Fletcher – keyboards
- Mickey Feat – bass
- Terry Williams – drums

Production

- Mark Knopfler – producer
- Neil Dorfsman – engineer
- Matt D'Arbanlay-Butler – assistance engineer

== Release history ==
The Comfort and Joy soundtrack was released as a three-song 12" vinyl record in 1984. It has never been released in CD format, but the songs were issued on CD as b-sides of two CD singles promoting the Screenplaying album (which doesn't include any of the Comfort and Joy tracks). "Comfort" was the b-side of the 1993 "Going Home" CD single; "Joy" and "A Fistful of Ice Cream" appeared on the 1994 "Irish Boy" CD single.
