= One Deep River =

Studio album by Mark Knopfler
- Released: 12 April 2024
- Length: 51:46
- Labels: British Grove; EMI
- Producers: Mark Knopfler; Guy Fletcher

Mark Knopfler chronology
Down the Road Wherever (2018)	One Deep River (2024)	The Boy (2024)

Singles from One Deep River
- 1. "Ahead of the Game" Released: 24 January 2024; 2. "Watch Me Gone" Released: 22 February 2024; 3. "Two Pairs of Hands" Released: 27 March 2024

One Deep River is the tenth solo album by British musician Mark Knopfler. It was released on 12 April 2024. On 5 February, Knopfler released a behind-the-scenes video on YouTube of him and the band at work on the album. Guy Fletcher, John McCusker, Michael McGoldrick and Greg Leisz are shown to be part of the band.

The first three singles from the album released are "Ahead of the Game" (released on 24 January), "Watch Me Gone" (released 22 February) and "Two Pairs of Hands" (released 27 March).

The album was followed by a standalone EP for Record Store Day called The Boy, containing four exclusive songs around a common theme of fairgrounds and boxing.

== Cover art ==
The album's cover art depicts the Tyne Bridge spanning the River Tyne, which passes through his hometown of Newcastle upon Tyne. To celebrate the album's release, Knopfler's website hosted a virtual Tyne Bridge for users to attach digital love lock messages onto.

== Critical reception ==
Classic Rock writer David Quantick defined the album as one of the best of Knopfler's career, finding "gorgeous songs" which "sounds like it's lived a life that's full".

In a mixed review Robin Murray of Clash wrote that the album "display his guitar chops, and his honesty" with references to "blockbuster Dire Straits albums", pointing out that it is "rooted in classic American songwriting, it feels humble, and often moving". The writer found that "While the playing is never less than exceptional" the productions "can sometimes falter, [...] a little dated, and rob the material of energy".

AllMusic critic Timothy Monger gave the album a positive review, stating that Mark Knopfler's "output as a singer/songwriter has remained remarkably consistent and uniquely his own". He went on to say that "Like its predecessor, 2018's Down the Road Wherever, One Deep River doesn't necessarily break new ground for Knopfler, but it does add a clutch of well-written, impeccably played songs to his canon ... These are the kind of smart slice-of-life lyrics Knopfler has built his career on and can still deliver with a craftsman's ease".

== Track listing ==
All tracks are written by Mark Knopfler.

Standard edition track listing
No.	Title	Length
1.	"Two Pairs of Hands"	4:05
2.	"Ahead of the Game"	3:56
3.	"Smart Money"	4:27
4.	"Scavengers Yard"	4:33
5.	"Black Tie Jobs"	2:57
6.	"Tunnel 13"	5:27
7.	"Janine"	4:42
8.	"Watch Me Gone"	5:02
9.	"Sweeter Than the Rain"	4:16
10.	"Before My Train Comes"	4:04
11.	"This One's Not Going to End Well"	4:00
12.	"One Deep River"	4:17
Total length:		51:46

Bonus vinyl tracks
No.	Title	Length
1.	"Dolly Shop Man"	5:08
2.	"Your Leading Man"	4:05
3.	"Wrong'un"	2:53
4.	"Chess"	3:26

Bonus CD tracks and Blu-ray audio tracks
No.	Title	Length
1.	"The Living End"	3:44
2.	"Fat Chance Dupree"	4:15
3.	"Along a Foreign Coast"	4:34
4.	"What I'm Gonna Need"	2:52
5.	"Nothing but Rain"	3:30

EP The Boy
No.	Title	Length
1.	"Mr Soloman's Said"	6:09
2.	"The Boy"	5:29
3.	"All Comers"	5:15
4.	"Bad Day For A Knife Thrower"	4:35

== Personnel ==
Musicians

- Mark Knopfler – lead vocals, electric guitar
- Ian Thomas – drums
- Danny Cummings – percussion
- Guy Fletcher – synthesizer (tracks 1–4, 6, 7, 9–12), Mellotron (5), harmonium (6)
- Richard Bennett – electric guitar (tracks 1, 2, 11), acoustic guitar (3–10, 12), bouzouki (9)
- Glenn Worf – bass guitar (tracks 1, 3–9, 11, 12), upright bass (2, 10)
- Greg Leisz – lap steel guitar (tracks 1, 4), acoustic guitar (2, 3), pedal steel (3, 5–12)
- Jim Cox – digital piano (track 1), piano (2, 3, 5, 7–11), organ (4), Wurlitzer electric piano (6), Hammond organ (12)
- Emma Topolski – background vocals (tracks 3, 5–8, 10–12)
- Tamsin Topolski – background vocals (tracks 3, 5–8, 10–12)
- John McCusker – fiddle (track 11)
- Mike McGoldrick – uilleann pipes, whistle (track 11)

Technical

- Mark Knopfler – production
- Guy Fletcher – production, mixing, engineering
- Luie Stylianou – mixing assistance, engineering assistance
- Edie Delafield – engineering assistance
- Eve Morris – engineering assistance
- Rowan McIntosh – engineering assistance
- Tom Coath – engineering assistance
- Bob Ludwig – mastering

== Charts ==
=== Weekly charts ===
Weekly chart performance for One Deep River
Chart (2024)	Peak position
Australian Albums (ARIA)	48
Austrian Albums (Ö3 Austria)	1
Belgian Albums (Ultratop Flanders)	2
Belgian Albums (Ultratop Wallonia)	2
Croatian International Albums (HDU)	1
Danish Albums (Hitlisten)	6
Dutch Albums (Album Top 100)	2
Finnish Albums (Suomen virallinen lista)	8
French Albums (SNEP)	6
German Albums (Offizielle Top 100)	1
Hungarian Albums (MAHASZ)	19
Irish Albums (Official Charts)	19
Italian Albums (FIMI)	5
New Zealand Albums (RMNZ)	15
Norwegian Albums (VG-lista)	4
Polish Albums (ZPAV)	3
Portuguese Albums (AFP)	8
Scottish Albums (Official Charts)	3
Spanish Albums (Promusicae)	2
Swedish Albums (Sverigetopplistan)	9
Swiss Albums (Schweizer Hitparade)	1
UK Albums (Official Charts)	3
UK Americana Albums (Official Charts)	2
US Billboard 200	157
US Top Rock & Alternative Albums (Billboard)	36

=== Year-end charts ===
Year-end chart performance for One Deep River
Chart (2024)	Position
Austrian Albums (Ö3 Austria)	69
German Albums (Offizielle Top 100)	39
Swiss Albums (Schweizer Hitparade)	14
