= Mark Knopfler =

British musician (born 1949)

Mark Knopfler OBE
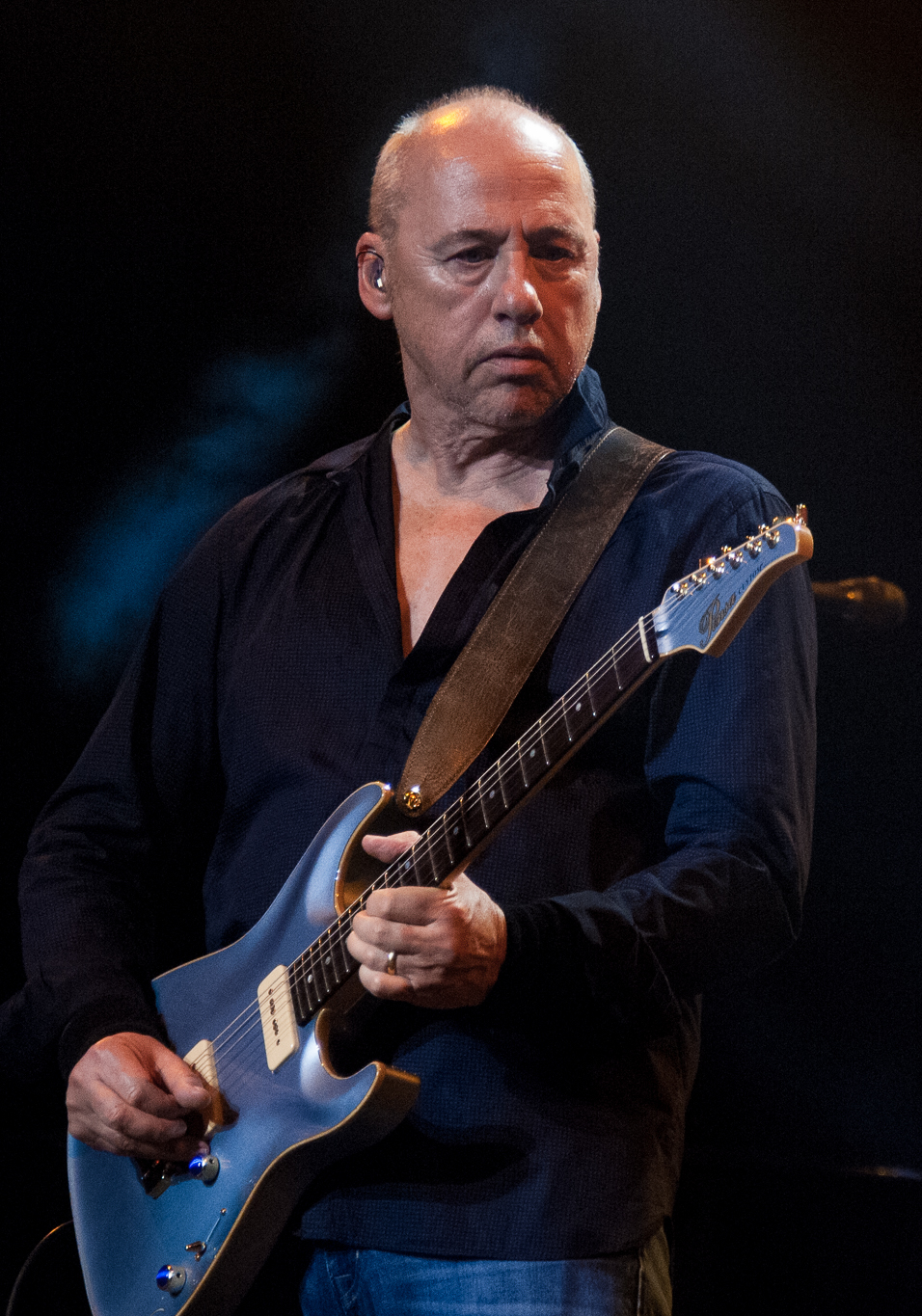
- Knopfler performing in 2015

Background information
- Born: Mark Freuder Knopfler; 12 August 1949 (age 77); Glasgow, Scotland
- Origin: Newcastle upon Tyne, England
- Genres: Roots rock; Celtic rock; blues rock; country rock
- Occupations: Musician; singer; songwriter; record producer
- Instruments: Guitar; vocals
- Years active: 1965–present
- Labels: Vertigo; Mercury; Warner Bros.; Reprise; Verve; Virgin EMI; Blue Note
- Formerly of: Silverheels, Brewers Droop, Dire Straits, Ferry Aid, The Notting Hillbillies, Mark Knopfler's Guitar Heroes
- Website: markknopfler.com

Mark Freuder Knopfler (born 12 August 1949) is a British musician. He was the lead guitarist, singer and songwriter of the rock band Dire Straits from 1977 to 1995, and is one of the two members who stayed throughout the band's existence, along with the bassist John Illsley. After Dire Straits dissolved, he pursued a solo career and is now an independent artist.

Knopfler was born in Glasgow, and was raised in Newcastle. After graduating from the University of Leeds and working for three years as a college lecturer, Knopfler co-founded Dire Straits with his younger brother, David Knopfler. The band recorded six albums, including Brothers in Arms (1985), one of the best-selling albums in history. After Dire Straits disbanded in 1995, Knopfler began a solo career, and has produced ten solo albums to date. He has composed and produced film scores for nine films, including Local Hero (1983), Cal (1984), The Princess Bride (1987), Wag the Dog (1997) and Altamira (2016). He has produced albums for Tina Turner, Bob Dylan, and Randy Newman.

Described by Classic Rock as a virtuoso, Knopfler is a fingerstyle guitarist and was ranked 27th on Rolling Stone's list of the "100 Greatest Guitarists of All Time". With Dire Straits, Knopfler sold between 100 million and 120 million records. A four-time Grammy Award winner, Knopfler is the recipient of the Edison Award, the Steiger Award and the Ivor Novello Award, as well as holding three honorary doctorate degrees in music from universities in the United Kingdom. Knopfler was inducted into the Rock and Roll Hall of Fame as a member of Dire Straits in 2018.

== Biography ==
=== 1949–1976: Early life ===
Mark Freuder Knopfler was born on 12 August 1949 in Glasgow, Scotland, to an English mother, Louisa Mary (née Laidler), and a Hungarian Jewish father, Erwin Knopfler. His mother was a teacher, and his father was an architect and a chess player who left his native Hungary in 1939 to flee the Nazis. Knopfler later described his father as a Marxist agnostic.

The Knopflers originally lived in Glasgow but the family moved to Briarfield Road, Gosforth, Newcastle upon Tyne, in North East England, closer to Knopfler's mother's hometown of Blyth, when Mark was seven years old. Mark attended Bearsden Primary School in Scotland for two years and later in Newcastle attended Archibald Street School and Gosforth Grammar School along with his brother, David.

Originally inspired by his uncle Kingsley's harmonica and boogie-woogie piano playing, Mark soon became familiar with many different styles of music. Although he hounded his father for an expensive Fiesta Red Fender Stratocaster electric guitar just like Hank Marvin's, he eventually bought a twin-pick-up Höfner Super Solid for £50 (equivalent to £1,000 in 2025).

In 1963, when he was 13, he took a Saturday job at the Newcastle Evening Chronicle newspaper earning six shillings and sixpence. Here he met the poet Basil Bunting, who was a copy editor. In 2015, Knopfler wrote a track in tribute to him. At this time, Knopfler got around the country largely by hitchhiking, and also hitched through Europe a number of times.

During the 1960s, Knopfler formed and joined several bands and listened to singers like Elvis Presley and guitarists Chet Atkins, Scotty Moore, B. B. King, Django Reinhardt, Hank Marvin, and James Burton. At the age of 16, he made a local television appearance as part of a harmony duo, with his classmate Sue Hercombe.

In 1968, after studying journalism for a year at Harlow College, Knopfler was hired as a junior reporter in Leeds for the Yorkshire Evening Post. During this time, he made the acquaintance of local furniture restorer, country blues enthusiast and part-time performer Steve Phillips, one year his senior, from whose record collection and guitar style Knopfler acquired a good knowledge of early blues artists and their styles. The two formed a duo called "The Duolian String Pickers", which performed in local folk and acoustic blues venues. Two years later, Knopfler decided to further his education, and later graduated with a degree in English at the University of Leeds.

In April 1970, while living in Leeds, he recorded a demo disc of an original song he had written, "Summer's Coming My Way". The recording included Knopfler (guitar and vocals), Steve Phillips (second guitar), Dave Johnson (bass), and Paul Granger (percussion). Johnson, Granger, and vocalist Mick Dewhirst played with Knopfler in a band called Silverheels; Phillips was later to rejoin Knopfler in the short lived side exercise from Dire Straits, The Notting Hillbillies.

Upon graduation in 1973, Knopfler moved to London and joined a band based in High Wycombe called Brewers Droop. This group had issued studio-recorded material before Knopfler joined, and went into the studio while Knopfler was a member—but Brewer's Droop material with Knopfler remained unissued until appearing on their 1989 archival album The Booze Brothers.

One night, while spending time with friends, the only guitar available was an old acoustic with a badly warped neck that had been strung with extra-light strings to make it usable. Even so, he found it impossible to play unless he finger-picked it, leading to the development of his signature playing style. He said in a later interview, "That was where I found my 'voice' on guitar." After a brief stint with Brewers Droop, Knopfler took a job as a lecturer at Loughton College in Essex – a position he held for three years. Throughout this time, he continued performing with local pub bands, including the Café Racers.

By the mid-1970s, Knopfler devoted much of his musical energies to his group, the Café Racers. His brother David moved to London, where he shared a flat with John Illsley, a guitarist who changed over to playing bass guitar. In April 1977, Mark moved out of his flat in Buckhurst Hill and moved in with David and Illsley. The three began playing music together, and soon Mark invited Illsley to join the Café Racers.

=== 1977–1995: Dire Straits ===
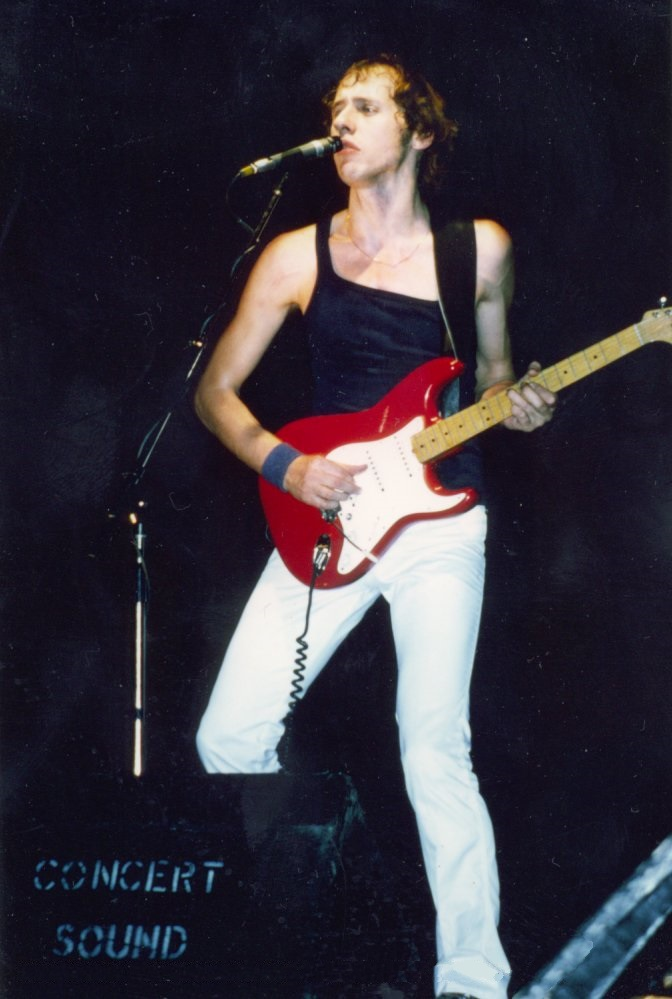
Knopfler with Dire Straits, 1979

Dire Straits' first demos were recorded in three sessions in 1977, with David Knopfler as rhythm guitarist, John Illsley as bass guitarist, and Pick Withers as drummer. On 27 July 1977, they recorded the demo tapes of five songs: "Wild West End", "Sultans of Swing", "Down to the Waterline", "Sacred Loving" (a David Knopfler song), and "Water of Love". They later recorded "Southbound Again", "In the Gallery", and "Six Blade Knife" for BBC Radio London—and, finally, on 9 November, made demo tapes of "Setting Me Up", "Eastbound Train", and "Real Girl". Many of these songs reflect Knopfler's experiences in Newcastle, Leeds, and London, and were featured on their debut album, the eponymous Dire Straits, which was released in the following year: "Down to the Waterline" recalled images of life in Newcastle; "In The Gallery" is a tribute to a Leeds sculptor and artist named Harry Phillips (father of Steve Phillips); and "Lions", "Wild West End", and "Eastbound Train" were all drawn from Knopfler's early days in the capital.

The group’s first album Dire Straits was released in June 1978 to slow response to begin with, but when "Sultans of Swing" was re-released as a single in January 1979, the album became a chart hit in the Netherlands and album sales took off – first across Europe, and then in the United States and Canada, and finally the UK. In June 1979 the group’s second album, Communiqué, produced by Jerry Wexler and Barry Beckett, was released.

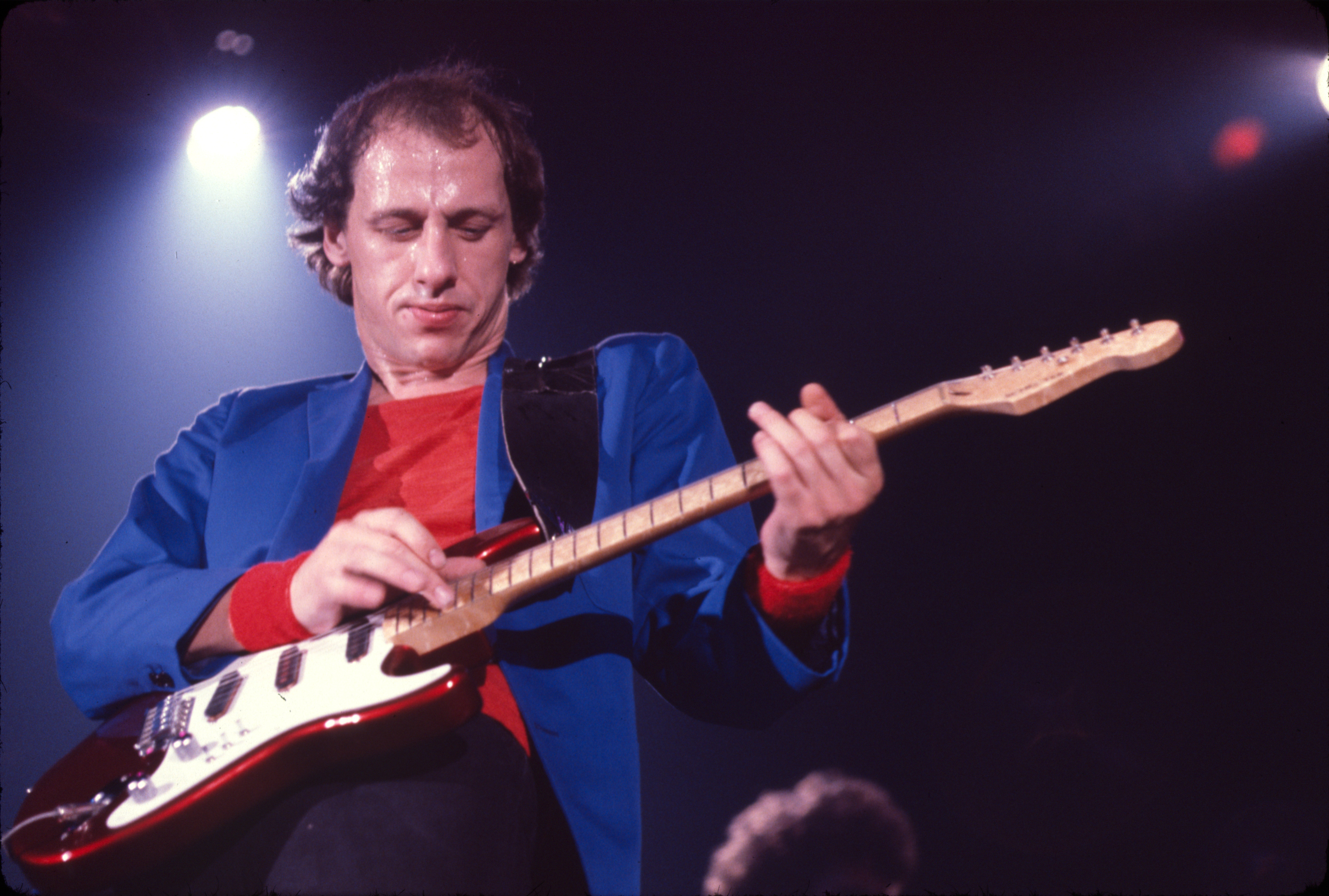
Knopfler with Dire Straits at the Agora Ballroom in Dallas, Texas, 1980

Their third album, Making Movies, released in October 1980, moved towards more complex arrangements and production, which continued for the remainder of the group's career. The album included many of Mark Knopfler's most personal compositions, most notably "Romeo and Juliet" and "Tunnel of Love", with its intro "The Carousel Waltz" by Richard Rodgers and Oscar Hammerstein II, which also featured in the 1982 Richard Gere film An Officer and a Gentleman. There were frequent personnel changes within Dire Straits from 1980 onwards, with Mark Knopfler and John Illsley the only members to remain throughout the group's 18-year existence. In 1980 whilst the recording sessions for Making Movies were taking place, tensions between the Knopfler brothers reached a point where David Knopfler decided to leave the band for a solo career. The remaining trio continued the album, with Roy Bittan from Bruce Springsteen's E Street Band guesting on keyboards and session guitarist Sid McGinnis on rhythm guitar, although he was uncredited on the album. After the recording sessions were completed, keyboardist Alan Clark and Californian guitarist Hal Lindes joined Dire Straits as full-time members for the On Location tour of Europe, North America, and Oceania.

In September 1982, the group's fourth studio album Love Over Gold was released. This featured the tracks "Private Investigations", "Telegraph Road", "Industrial Disease", "It Never Rains", and the title track of the album, "Love Over Gold". Drummer Pick Withers announced his departure from the band after the recording sessions of the album were completed.

In early 1983, with Love Over Gold still in the albums charts, the band released a four-song EP titled ExtendedancEPlay. Featuring the hit single "Twisting by the Pool", this was the first output from Dire Straits that featured new drummer Terry Williams, (formerly of Rockpile and Man). An eight month long Love over Gold Tour followed which finished with two sold-out concerts at London's Hammersmith Odeon on 22 and 23 July 1983. In March 1984 the double album Alchemy Live was released, which documented the recordings of these final two live shows. It was also released in VHS video and reached number three in the UK Albums Chart, and was reissued in DVD and Blu-ray format in 2010.

During 1983 and 1984, Mark Knopfler was also involved with other projects outside of Dire Straits, some of which other band members contributed towards. Knopfler and Terry Williams played on Phil Everly's and Cliff Richard's song "She Means Nothing To Me", which reached the Top 10 in the UK Singles Chart in February 1983, taken from the album Phil Everly. Knopfler had also expressed his interest writing film music, and after producer David Puttnam responded he wrote and produced the music score to the film Local Hero. The album was released in April 1983 and received a BAFTA award nomination for Best Score for a Film the following year. Alan Clark also contributed, and other Dire Straits members Illsley, Lindes and Williams played on one track, "Freeway Flyer", and Gerry Rafferty contributed lead vocals on "The Way It Always Starts". The closing track on the album and on the credits in the film is the instrumental "Going Home: Theme of the Local Hero" which was released as a single and became a popular live staple for Dire Straits, entering the band's repertoire from 1983 onwards.

"Local Hero" was followed in 1984 by Knopfler's music scores for the films Cal and Comfort and Joy, both of which also featured Terry Williams, as well as keyboardist Guy Fletcher. Also during this time Knopfler produced Bob Dylan's Infidels album, as well as Knife by Aztec Camera. He also wrote the song "Private Dancer" which was recorded by Tina Turner for her comeback album of the same name, to which other Dire Straits members John Illsley, Alan Clark, Hal Lindes and Terry Williams contributed the backing track. Knopfler also contributed lead guitar to Bryan Ferry's album Boys and Girls, released in June 1985.

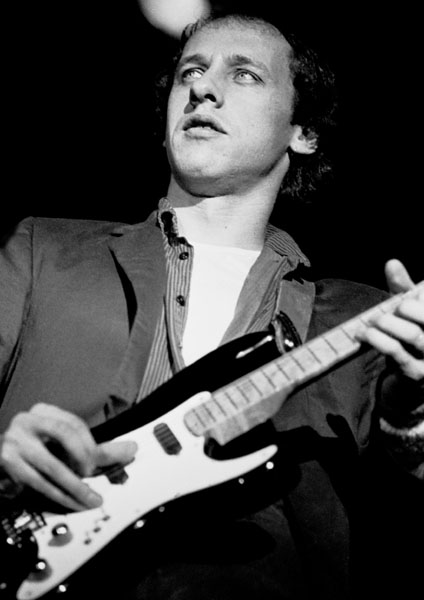
Knopfler performing in Dublin, 1981

Dire Straits' biggest studio album by far was their fifth, Brothers in Arms. Recording of the album started at the end of 1984 at George Martin's AIR Studios in Montserrat with Knopfler and Neil Dorfsman producing. There were further personnel changes. Guy Fletcher joined the band as a full-time member, so the group now had two keyboardists, while second guitarist Hal Lindes left the band early on during the recording sessions and was replaced in December 1984 by Jack Sonni, a New York-based guitarist and longstanding friend of Knopfler (although Sonni's contribution to the album was minimal). The then permanent drummer Terry Williams was released from the recording sessions after the first six weeks and was temporarily replaced by jazz session drummer Omar Hakim, who re-recorded the album's drum parts within three days before leaving for other commitments. Williams would return as a full-time member for the music videos and the 1985–1986 Brothers in Arms world tour that followed.

Released in May 1985, Brothers in Arms became an international blockbuster that has sold more than 30 million copies worldwide, and in 2006 was the fourth best selling album in UK chart history. Brothers in Arms spawned several chart singles including the US number one hit "Money for Nothing", which was the first video played on MTV in Britain. It was also the first compact disc to sell a million copies and is largely credited for launching the CD format as it was also one of the first DDD CDs ever released, Other successful singles were "So Far Away", "Walk of Life", and the album's title track. The band embarked on a 1985–1986 Brothers in Arms world tour of over 230 shows which was immensely successful.

After the Brothers in Arms world tour Dire Straits ceased working together for some time, with Knopfler concentrating mainly on film soundtracks. He joined the charity ensemble Ferry Aid on "Let It Be" in the wake of the Zeebrugge ferry disaster. The track reached No. 1 on the UK Singles Chart for three weeks in March 1987. He also wrote the music score for the film The Princess Bride, released at the end of 1987. It featured the song "Storybook Love" with Willy DeVille.

Knopfler also took part in a comedy skit (featured on the French and Saunders show) titled "The Easy Guitar Book Sketch" with comedian Rowland Rivron and fellow British musicians David Gilmour, Lemmy from Motörhead, Mark King from Level 42, and Gary Moore. Phil Taylor explained in an interview that Knopfler used Gilmour's guitar rig and managed to sound like himself when performing in the skit.

Dire Straits regrouped for 11 June 1988 Nelson Mandela 70th Birthday Tribute concert at Wembley Stadium, in which they were the headline act, without guitarist Jack Sonni who had become a father to twin daughters. They were accompanied by Eric Clapton, who filled in for Sonni and who by this time had developed a strong friendship with Knopfler. This concluded Sonni’s and Terry Williams’ time as members of Dire Straits. In September 1988 Knopfler announced the official dissolution of Dire Straits, saying that he "needed a rest". In October 1988, a compilation album, Money for Nothing, was released and reached number one in the United Kingdom.

Dire Straits reunited for a one-off charity concert in October 1989 at the Mayfair Ballroom in Newcastle in honour of Joanne Gillespie, the National Children of Courage and North East Personality award winner who was 11 years old at the time and published the 1989 book Brave Heart about her fight against cancer. The concert raised more than £35,000. This was the final appearance by Terry Williams as the band’s drummer, and Brendan Croker played rhythm guitar in place of Jack Sonni.

Also in 1989, Knopfler formed the Notting Hillbillies, a band at the other end of the commercial spectrum. It leaned heavily towards American roots music – folk, Blues and country music. The band members included keyboardist Guy Fletcher, with Brendan Croker and Steve Phillips. For both the album and the tour Paul Franklin was added to the line-up on pedal steel. The Notting Hillbillies sole studio album, Missing...Presumed Having a Good Time was released in March 1990, and Knopfler then toured with the Notting Hillbillies for the remainder of that year. He further emphasised his country music influences with his 1990s collaboration with Chet Atkins, Neck and Neck, which won three Grammy awards. The Hillbillies toured the UK in early 1990 with a limited number of shows. In this low-key tour the band packed out smaller venues such as Newcastle University.

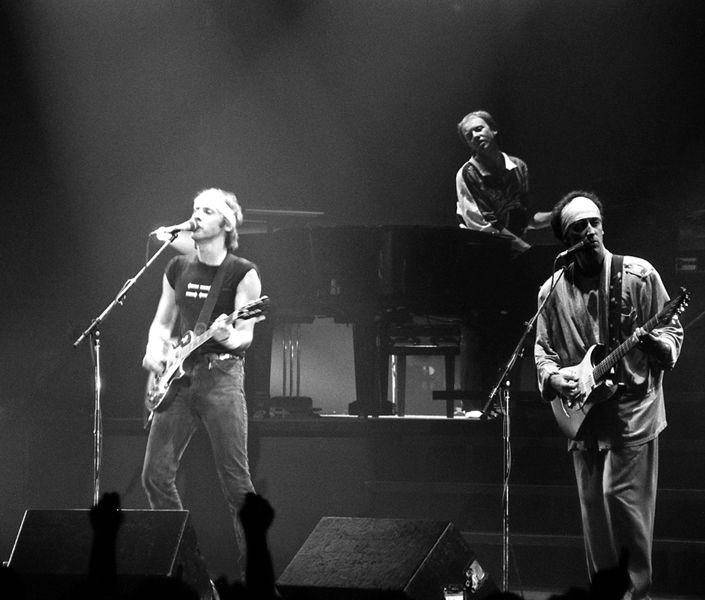
Knopfler with Dire Straits performing in Belgrade, 10 May 1985

In 1990, Knopfler, John Illsley, and Alan Clark performed as Dire Straits at Knebworth, joined by Eric Clapton, Ray Cooper, and guitarist Phil Palmer (who was at that time part of Eric Clapton's touring band), and in January the following year, Knopfler, John Illsley and manager Ed Bicknell decided to reform Dire Straits. Knopfler, Illsley, Alan Clark, and Guy Fletcher set about recording what turned out to be their final studio album accompanied by sidemen Phil Palmer, pedal steel guitarist Paul Franklin, percussionist Danny Cummings and Toto drummer Jeff Porcaro.

The follow-up to Brothers in Arms was finally released in September 1991. On Every Street was nowhere near as popular as its predecessor, and met with a mixed critical reaction, with some reviewers regarding the album as an underwhelming comeback after a six-year break. Nonetheless, the album sold well and reached No. 1 in the UK. Session drummer Chris Whitten joined Dire Straits as they embarked on a gruelling world tour featuring 300 shows in front of some 7.1 million ticket-buying fans. This was to be Dire Straits' final world tour; it was not as well received as the previous Brothers in Arms tour, and by this time Mark Knopfler had had enough of such huge operations. Manager Ed Bicknell is quoted as saying "The last tour was utter misery. Whatever the zeitgeist was that we had been part of, it had passed." John Illsley agreed, saying "Personal relationships were in trouble and it put a terrible strain on everybody, emotionally and physically. We were changed by it." This drove the band into the ground, and ultimately led to the group's final dissolution in 1995.

Following the tour, Knopfler took some time off from the music business. In 1993, he received an honorary music doctorate from the University of Newcastle upon Tyne. Two more Dire Straits albums were released, both live albums. On the Night, released in May 1993, documented Dire Straits' final world tour. In 1995, following the release of Live at the BBC (a contractual release to Vertigo Records), Mark Knopfler quietly dissolved Dire Straits and launched his career as a solo artist. Knopfler later recalled that, "I put the thing to bed because I wanted to get back to some kind of reality. It's self-protection, a survival thing. That kind of scale is dehumanizing." Knopfler would spend two years recovering from the experience, which had taken a toll on his creative and personal life.

Since the 1995 break-up of Dire Straits, Knopfler has shown no interest in reforming the group. However, keyboardist Guy Fletcher has been associated with almost every piece of Knopfler's solo material to date, while Danny Cummings has also contributed frequently, notably to four of Knopfler's recent solo album releases: All the Roadrunning (with Emmylou Harris), Kill to Get Crimson, Get Lucky and One Deep River.

In October 2008 Knopfler declined a suggestion by John Illsley that the band should reform. Illsley said that a reunion would be "entirely up to Mark"; however, he also observed that Knopfler was enjoying his success as a solo artist. When asked about a possible reunion, Knopfler responded, "Oh, I don't know whether to start getting all that stuff back together again", and that the global fame Dire Straits achieved in the 1980s "just got too big".

In December 2017, Dire Straits were announced as inductees into the Rock and Roll Hall of Fame for 2018. Speaking to Billboard magazine, John Illsley said that he was pleased to have his work as a musician recognised, and that he felt that Knopfler was not enthusiastic about a possible reunion performance. Knopfler did not appear at the ceremony; only John Illsley, Alan Clark and Guy Fletcher were in attendance. Dire Straits were the first act ever inducted without anyone introducing them, and they did not perform.

In November 2021, John Illsley published his autobiography My Life in Dire Straits, in which he confirms that Knopfler has no interest in reforming Dire Straits, which he again reiterated in an interview in November 2023. He reflected that the band members had "reached the end of the road" after the end of their final world tour in 1992, and that he was "pretty happy" when the band's run came to an end, recalling feeling "mentally, physically and emotionally exhausted" by the time Dire Straits disbanded. At the time, Illsley also said, "I can openly admit to you that I really enjoyed the success of the band, I'm speaking for Mark as well, we both really enjoyed [it]. It comes with a certain amount of stress, obviously. You've got to really dig deep sometimes to keep it working. I think Mark said – and I hope I'm quoting him correctly here – but he said that success is great, but fame is what comes out of the exhaust pipe of a car. It's something you don't really want".

Dire Straits remain one of the most popular British rock bands as well as one of the world's most commercially successful bands, with worldwide album sales of more than 120 million.

=== 1996–present: Solo career ===
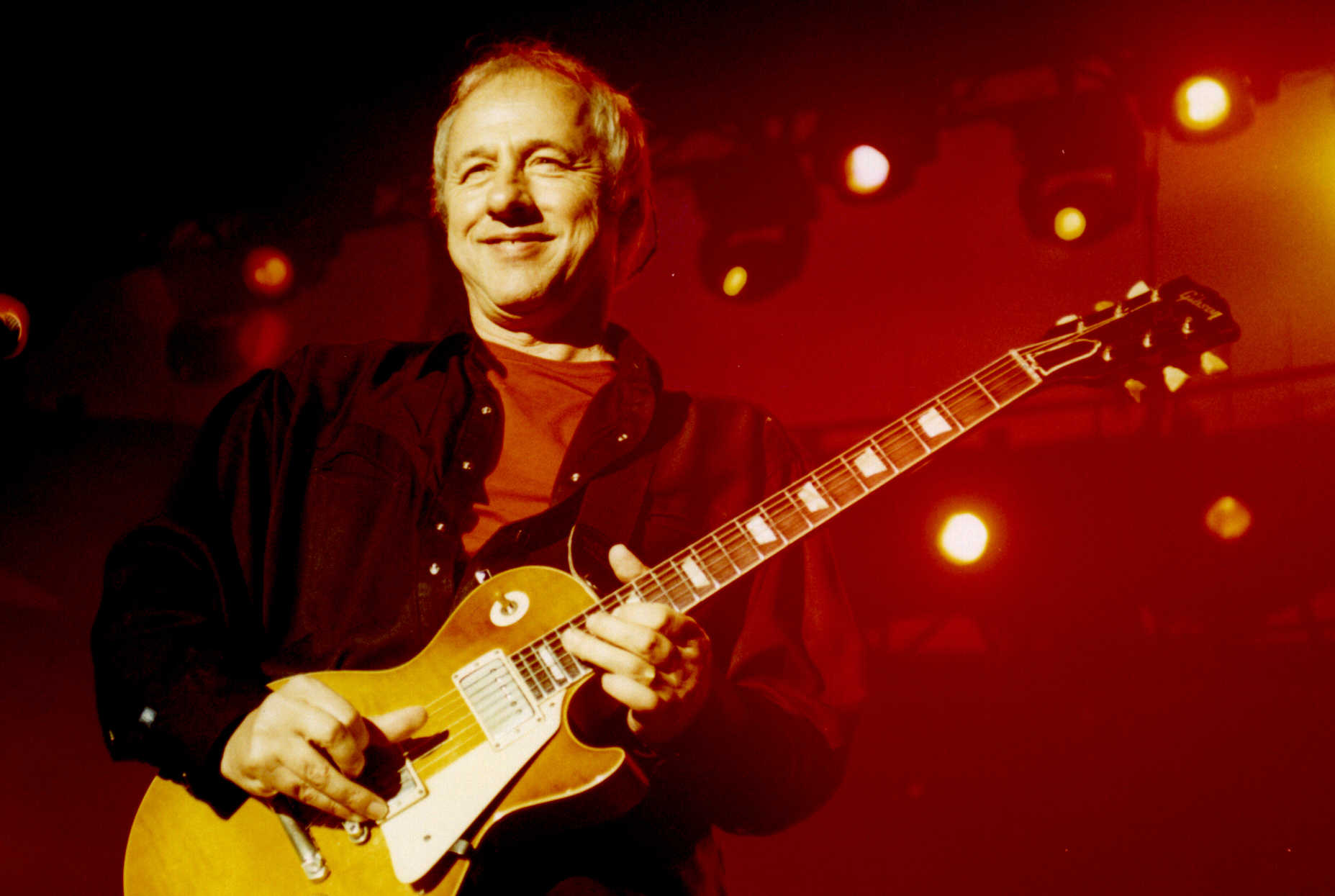
Knopfler performing in Bilbao, 2001

Knopfler's debut solo album, Golden Heart, was released in March 1996. It featured the UK single "Darling Pretty". The album's recording sessions helped create his backing band, which is also known as The 96ers. It features his old bandmate Guy Fletcher on keyboards. This band's main line-up has lasted much longer than any Dire Straits line-up. Also in 1996, Knopfler recorded guitar for Ted Christopher's Dunblane massacre tribute cover, Knockin' on Heaven's Door.

Knopfler composed his first film score in 1983 for Local Hero. In 1997, he recorded the soundtrack for the movie Wag the Dog. During that same year Rolling Stone magazine listed Rock 'n' Roll Hall of Fame's 500 Songs That Shaped Rock and Roll, which included "Sultans of Swing", Dire Straits' first hit. 2000 saw the release of his solo album, Sailing to Philadelphia. This has been his most successful to date. On 15 September 1997, Knopfler appeared at the Music for Montserrat concert at the Royal Albert Hall, London, performing alongside artists such as Sting, Phil Collins, Elton John, Eric Clapton and Paul McCartney.

In July 2002, Knopfler gave four charity concerts under the name of "Mark Knopfler and friends" with former Dire Straits members John Illsley, Chris White, Danny Cummings and Guy Fletcher, playing old material from the Dire Straits years. The concerts also featured The Notting Hillbillies with Brendan Croker and Steve Phillips. At these four concerts (three of the four were at the Shepherd's Bush, the fourth at Beaulieu on the south coast) they were joined by Jimmy Nail, who provided backing vocals for Knopfler's 2002 composition Why Aye Man.

Also in 2002, Knopfler released his third solo album, The Ragpicker's Dream. In March 2003 he was involved in a motorbike crash in Grosvenor Road, Belgravia and suffered a broken collarbone, broken shoulder blade and seven broken ribs. The planned Ragpicker's Dream tour was subsequently cancelled, but Knopfler recovered and returned to the stage in 2004 for his fourth album, Shangri-La.

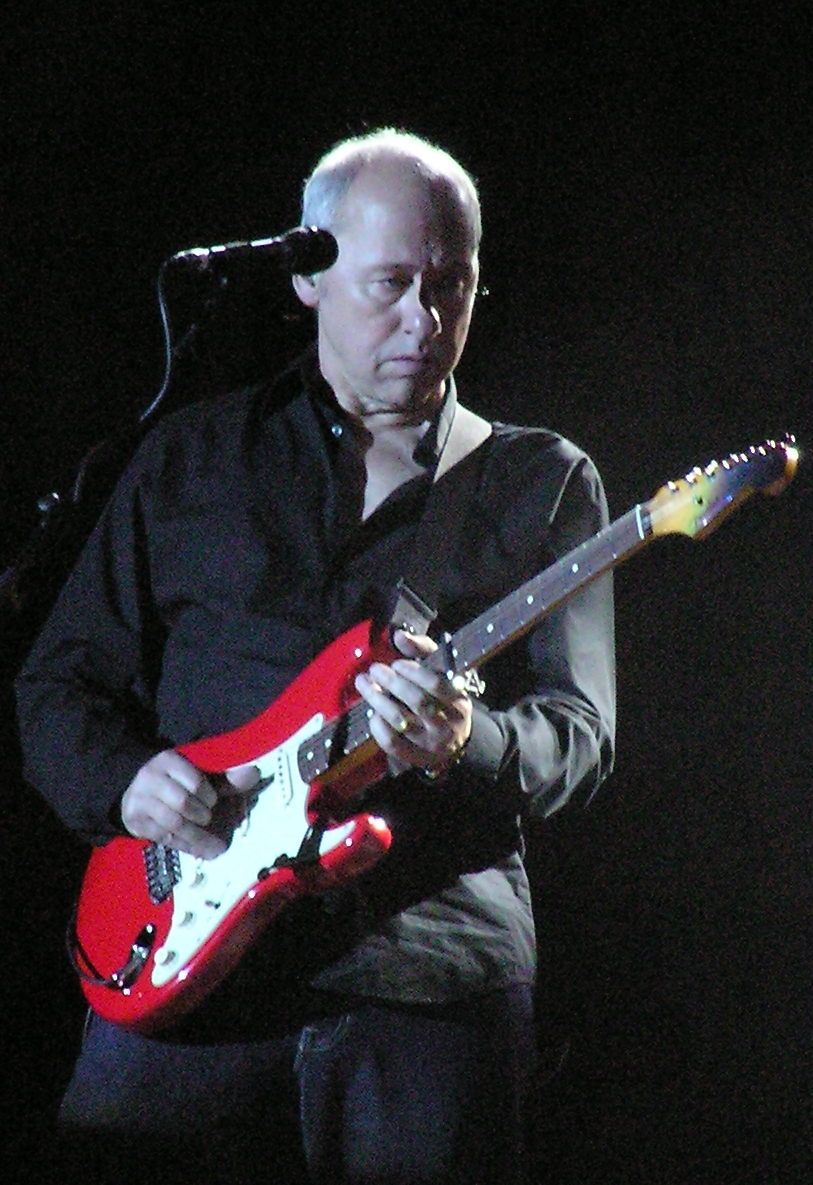
Knopfler performing in Hamburg, 2006

Shangri-La was recorded at the Shangri-La Studio in Malibu, California, in 2004, where the Band had made recordings years before for their documentary/movie, The Last Waltz. In the promo for Shangri-La on his official website, he said his current line-up of Glenn Worf (bass), Guy Fletcher (keyboards), Chad Cromwell (drums), Richard Bennett (guitar), and Matt Rollings (piano) "...play Dire Straits songs better than Dire Straits did." The Shangri-La tour took Knopfler to countries such as India and the United Arab Emirates for the first time. In India, his concerts at Mumbai and Bangalore were well received, with over 20,000 fans at each concert.

In November 2005 a compilation, Private Investigations: The Best of Dire Straits & Mark Knopfler was released, consisting of material from most of Dire Straits' studio albums and Knopfler's solo and soundtrack material. The album was released in two editions, as a single CD (with a grey cover) and as a double CD (with the cover in blue), and was well received. The only previously unreleased track on the album is All the Roadrunning, a duet with country music singer Emmylou Harris, which was followed in 2006 by an album of duets of the same name.

Released in April 2006, All the Roadrunning reached No. 1 in Denmark and Switzerland, No. 2 in Norway and Sweden, No. 3 in Germany, The Netherlands and Italy, No. 8 in Austria and UK, No. 9 in Spain, No. 17 in the United States (Billboard Top 200 Chart), No. 25 in Ireland, and No. 41 in Australia. All the Roadrunning was nominated for "Best Folk Rock/Americana Album" at the 49th Grammy Awards (11 February 2007) but lost out to Bob Dylan's nomination for Modern Times.

Joined by Emmylou Harris, Knopfler supported All the Roadrunning with a limited—15 concerts in Europe, 1 in Canada, and 8 in the United States—but highly successful tour of Europe and North America. Selections from the duo's performance of 28 June at the Gibson Amphitheatre, Universal City, California, were released as a DVD entitled Real Live Roadrunning on 14 November 2006. In addition to several of the compositions that Harris and Knopfler recorded together in the studio, Real Live Roadrunning features solo hits from both members of the duo, as well as three tracks from Knopfler's days with Dire Straits.

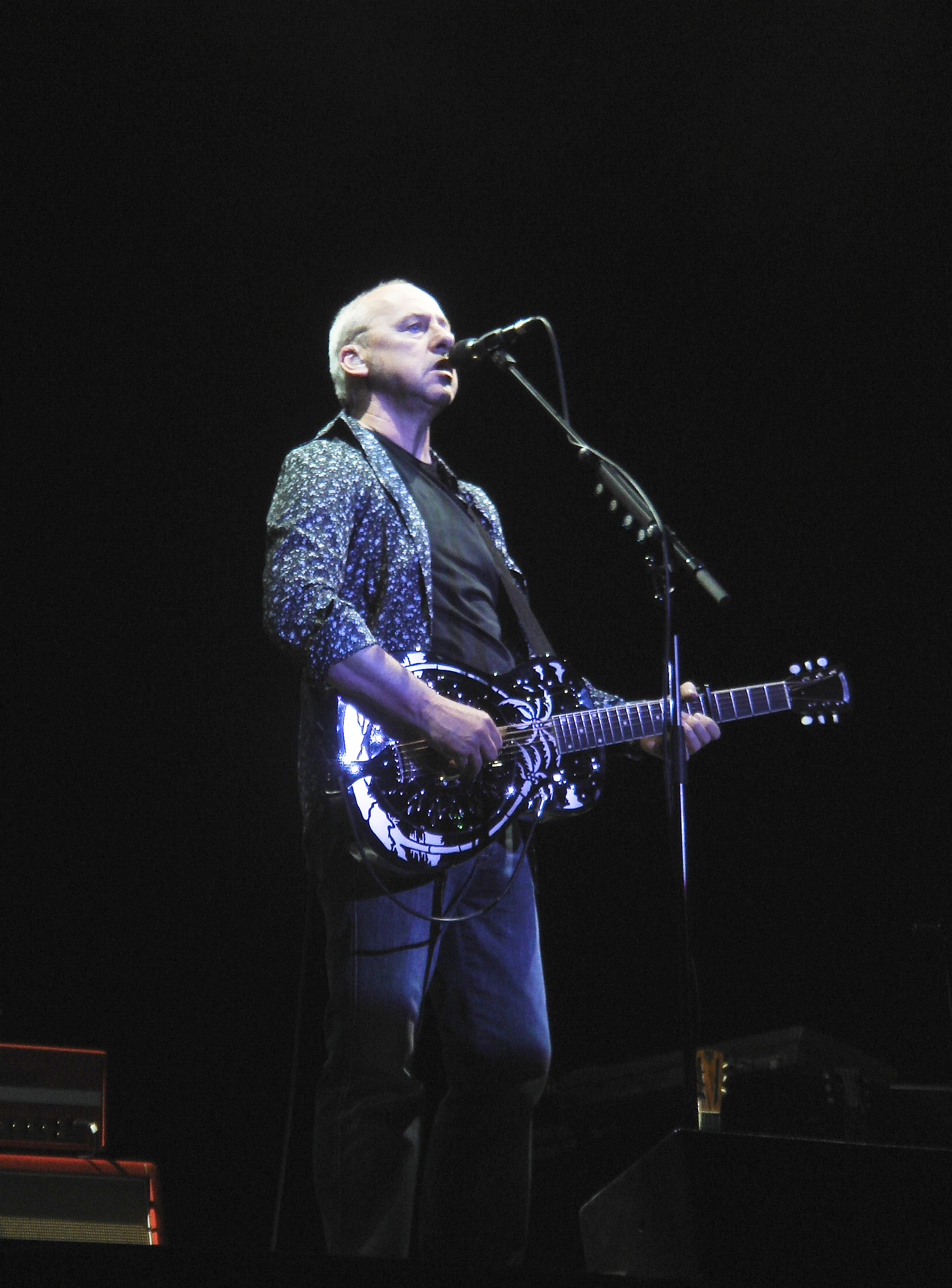
Knopfler at the NEC in Birmingham, England, 16 May 2008

A charity event in 2007 went wrong: a Fender Stratocaster guitar signed by Knopfler, Clapton, Brian May, and Jimmy Page, which was to be auctioned for £20,000 to raise the money for a children's hospice, was lost when being shipped. It vanished after being posted from London to Leicestershire, England." Parcelforce, the company responsible, agreed to pay £15,000 for its loss.

Knopfler released his fifth solo studio-album, Kill to Get Crimson, on 14 September 2007 in Germany, 17 September in the UK and 18 September in the United States. During the autumn of 2007 he played a series of intimate 'showcases' in various European cities to promote the album. A tour of Europe and North America followed in 2008.

Continuing a pattern of high productivity through his solo career, Knopfler began work on his next studio album, entitled Get Lucky, in September 2008 with long-time bandmate Guy Fletcher, who again compiled a pictorial diary of the making of the album on his website. The album was released on 14 September the following year and Knopfler subsequently undertook an extensive tour across Europe and America. The album met with moderate success on the charts (much of it in Europe) reaching No. 1 only in Norway but peaking in the Top 5 in most major European countries (Germany, Italy, The Netherlands). The album peaked at No. 2 on the Billboard European Album chart and at No. 5 on the Billboard Rock Album chart.

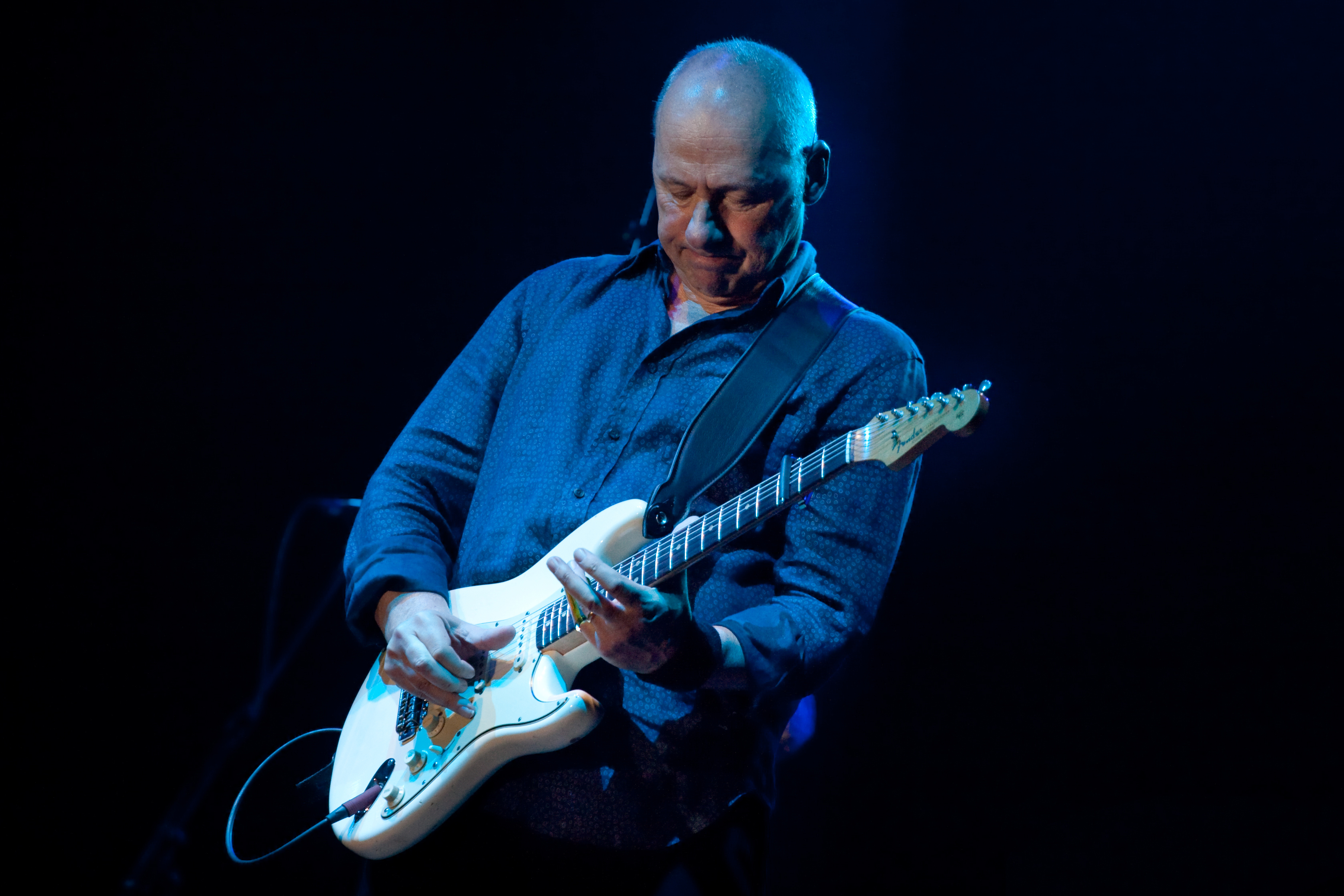
Knopfler performing in Zwolle, Netherlands, 2013

Knopfler's solo live performances employ minimal stage production other than some lighting effects. He sometimes drinks tea during shows. Richard Bennett, who has been playing with him on tour since 1996, has also joined in drinking tea with him on stage. On 31 July 2005, at the Queen Elizabeth Theatre in Vancouver, BC, the tea was replaced with whisky as a "last show of tour" sort of joke.

In February 2009, Knopfler gave an intimate solo concert at the Garrick Club in London. He had recently become a member of the exclusive gentlemen's club for men of letters. In 2010, he appeared on the Thomas Dolby EP Amerikana, performing on the track 17 Hills. In February 2011, Knopfler began work on his next solo album, Privateering, once again working with Guy Fletcher. In October and November 2011, he took a break from the recording sessions to take part in a European tour with Bob Dylan. The next year Knopfler covered a Bob Dylan song, "Restless Farewell", for an Amnesty International 50th Anniversary celebration record.

On 3 September 2012, Knopfler's seventh solo album, Privateering, was released. This was his first double album solo release and contained 20 new songs. After a further tour with Bob Dylan in the US during October and November, the Privateering tour of Europe followed in Spring/Summer 2013. A short run of five shows were played in the US that Autumn. Knopfler began work on another studio album in September 2013, again at his British Grove Studios in London with Guy Fletcher co-producing. On 16 September 2014, it was announced that this new album would be entitled Tracker, and that it would see a release in early 2015. European tour dates were also announced for Spring/Summer 2015. In 2016 he collaborated with the Italian bluesman Zucchero Fornaciari playing in Ci si arrende and Streets of Surrender (S.O.S.) contained in Black Cat.

With the November release of 2018's Down the Road Wherever, a world tour in support of the new album was announced for 2019. During interviews, Knopfler hinted that it would be his last one. The tour started with a show on 25 April in Barcelona during which Knopfler said to the live audience that the tour would be his last ever. However, during the tour this statement softened, and he said he would continue as he loves touring so much. The final concert of the tour (and Knopfler's final headline show to date) took place in New York City at Madison Square Garden on 25 September 2019.

Knopfler appears in Cliff Richard's song "PS Please" included on the Richard album Music... The Air That I Breathe released in 2020.

Knopfler penned the score for the musical version of Local Hero, including new songs alongside adding lyrics to the original instrumental music, reuniting again with Bill Forsyth.

In January 2024, Knopfler announced his latest album, One Deep River, which was released in April 2024, collaborating with Guy Fletcher once again. Also in early 2024, Knopfler assembled a supergroup, referred to as Mark Knopfler's Guitar Heroes, to record a new version of "Going Home: Theme of the Local Hero" to support the Teenage Cancer Trust and Teen Cancer America. The recording was produced by Guy Fletcher and was released on 15 March 2024, featuring contributions from more than sixty musicians.

=== Country music ===
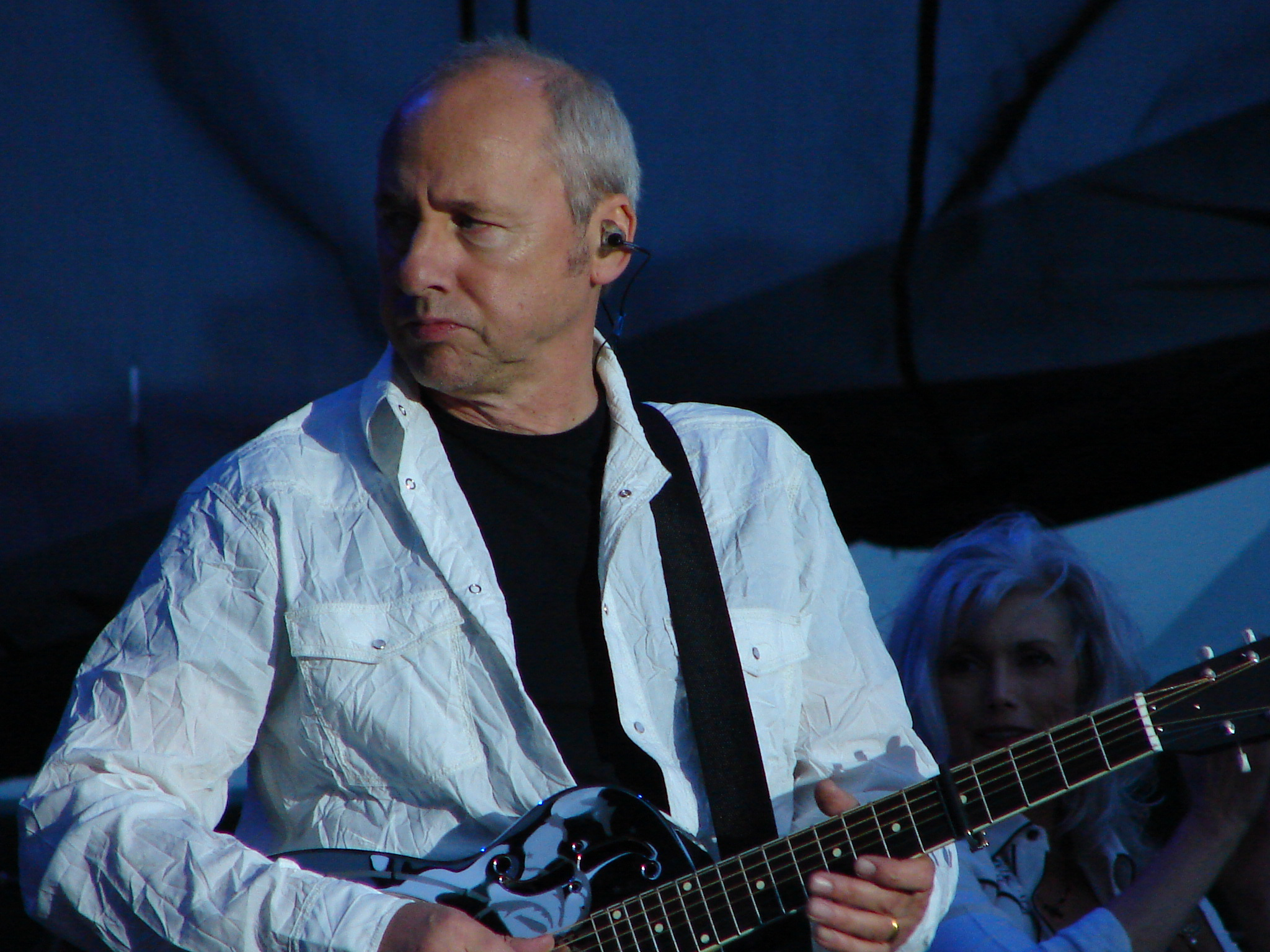
Knopfler performing in Chicago with Emmylou Harris, 2006

In addition to his work in Dire Straits and solo, Knopfler has made several contributions to country music. In 1988 he formed country-focused band the Notting Hillbillies, with Guy Fletcher, Brendan Croker and Steve Phillips. The Notting Hillbillies sole studio album, Missing...Presumed Having a Good Time was released in 1990 and featured the minor hit single "Your Own Sweet Way". Knopfler further emphasised his country music influences with his collaboration with Chet Atkins, Neck and Neck, which was also released in 1990. "Poor Boy Blues", taken from that collaboration, peaked at No. 92.

Knopfler's other contributions include writing and playing guitar on John Anderson's 1992 single "When It Comes to You" (from his album Seminole Wind). In 1993 Mary Chapin Carpenter also released a cover of the Dire Straits song The Bug. Randy Travis released another of Knopfler's songs, "Are We in Trouble Now", in 1996. In that same year, Knopfler's solo single "Darling Pretty" reached a peak of No. 87.

Knopfler collaborated with George Jones on the 1994 The Bradley Barn Sessions album, performing guitar duties on the classic J.P. Richardson composition "White Lightnin'". He is featured on Kris Kristofferson's album The Austin Sessions, (on the track "Please Don't Tell Me How The Story Ends") released in 1999 by Atlantic Records.

In 2006, Knopfler and Emmylou Harris made a country album together titled All the Roadrunning, followed by a live CD-DVD titled Real Live Roadrunning. Knopfler also charted two singles on the Canadian country music singles chart. Again in 2006, Knopfler contributed the song "Whoop De Doo" to Jimmy Buffett's Gulf and Western style album Take the Weather with You. In 2013, he wrote and played guitar on the song "Oldest Surfer on the Beach" to Buffett's album Songs From St. Somewhere.

== Musical style ==
Knopfler is left-handed, but plays the guitar right-handed. In its review of Dire Straits' Brothers in Arms in 1985, Spin commented, "Mark Knopfler may be the most lyrical of all rock guitarists." In the same year, Rolling Stone commended his "evocative" guitar style. According to Classic Rock in 2018, "The bare-boned economy of Knopfler's songs and his dizzying guitar fills were a breath of clean air amid the lumbering rock dinosaurs and one-dimensional punk thrashers of the late 70s. He was peerless as craftsman and virtuoso, able to plug into rock's classic lineage and bend it to sometimes wild forms. He wrote terrific songs, too: taut mini-dramas of dark depths and dazzling melodic and lyrical flourishes." Knopfler is also well known for playing fingerstyle exclusively, something he attributed to Chet Atkins.

== Personal life ==
Knopfler has been married three times, first to Kathy White, his long-time girlfriend from school days. They separated before Knopfler moved to London to join Brewers Droop in 1973. Knopfler's second marriage was in November 1983 to Lourdes Salomone. Knopfler and Salomone have twin sons, who were born in 1987. Their marriage ended in 1993. On Valentine's Day 1997 in Barbados, Knopfler married British actress and writer Kitty Aldridge, whom he had known for three years. Knopfler and Aldridge have two daughters.

Knopfler is a fan of Newcastle United F.C. His "Going Home (Theme of the Local Hero)" is used by Newcastle United as an anthem at home games. Knopfler also has a collection of classic cars which he races and exhibits at shows, including a Maserati 300S and an Austin-Healey 100S.

Knopfler was estimated to have a fortune of £75 million in the Sunday Times Rich List of 2018, making him one of the 40 wealthiest people in the British music industry.

In January 2024, more than 120 of Knopfler's guitars and amps were sold at auction in London for a total of more than £8 million, 25 percent of which was donated to charities. Included in the auction was the 1983 Les Paul used for hits like "Money For Nothing" and "Brothers in Arms." Knopfler expressed his desire for the instruments to find loving homes and hopes they will be played rather than stored away.

== Discography ==
Dire Straits albums

- Dire Straits (1978)
- Communiqué (1979)
- Making Movies (1980)
- Love over Gold (1982)
- Brothers in Arms (1985)
- On Every Street (1991)

Solo albums

- Golden Heart (1996)
- Sailing to Philadelphia (2000)
- The Ragpicker's Dream (2002)
- Shangri-La (2004)
- Kill to Get Crimson (2007)
- Get Lucky (2009)
- Privateering (2012)
- Tracker (2015)
- Down the Road Wherever (2018)
- One Deep River (2024)
EPs
- The Trawlerman's Song EP (2005)
- One Take Radio Sessions (2005)
- The Boy (2024)

Soundtrack albums

- Local Hero (1983)
- Cal (1984)
- Comfort and Joy (1984)
- The Princess Bride (1987)
- Last Exit to Brooklyn (1989)
- Wag the Dog (1998)
- Metroland (1999)
- A Shot at Glory (2002)
- Altamira (2016) with Evelyn Glennie

Collaborative albums

- Missing...Presumed Having a Good Time (1990) as a member of The Notting Hillbillies
- Neck and Neck (1990) with Chet Atkins
- All the Roadrunning (2006) with Emmylou Harris
- Real Live Roadrunning (2006) with Emmylou Harris

== Honours and awards ==
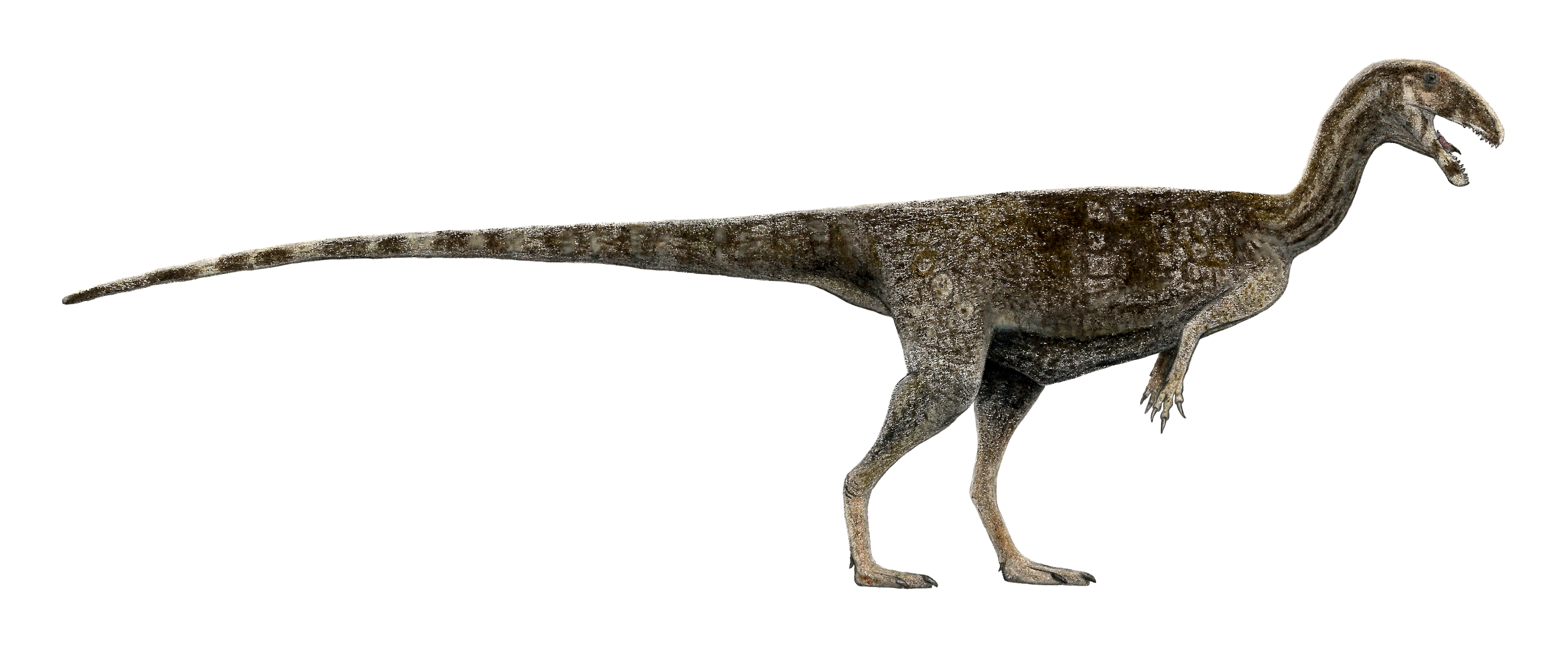
Masiakasaurus knopfleri is named after Knopfler

- 1983 BRIT Award for Best British Group (with Dire Straits)
- 1986 Grammy Award for Best Rock Vocal Group (with Dire Straits) for "Money for Nothing"
- 1986 Grammy Award for Best Country Instrumental Performance (with Chet Atkins) for "Cosmic Square Dance"
- 1986 Juno Award for International Album of the Year (with Dire Straits) for Brothers in Arms
- 1986 BRIT Award for Best British Group (with Dire Straits)
- 1987 BRIT Award for Best British Album (with Dire Straits) for Brothers in Arms
- 1991 Grammy Award for Best Country Vocal Collaboration (with Chet Atkins) for "Poor Boy Blues"
- 1991 Grammy Award for Best Country Instrumental Performance (with Chet Atkins) for "So Soft, Your Goodbye"
- 1993 Honorary Doctor of Music from Newcastle University
- 1995 Honorary Doctor of Music from the University of Leeds
- 2000 OBE
- 2001 Masiakasaurus knopfleri, a species of dinosaur, was named in his honour
- 2003 Edison Award for Outstanding Achievement in the Music Industry
- 2007 Honorary Doctor of Music from the University of Sunderland
- 2009 Music Producers Guild Award for Best Studio for Knopfler's British Grove Studios
- 2009 ARPS Sound Fellowship
- 2009 PRS Music Heritage Award
- 2011 Steiger Award
- 2012 Ivor Novello Lifetime Achievement Award
- The asteroid 28151 Markknopfler is named after him.
- 2018 Dire Straits inducted into the Rock and Roll Hall of Fame
- 2018 Living Legend Award Scottish Music Awards
- 2024 O2 Silver Clef Icon Award
