= Down to the Waterline =

- Label from "Back to Back Hits" series issue, on flip side of "Sultans of Swing"

Single by Dire Straits

from the album Dire Straits
- A-side: "Water of Love"
- Released: 1978
- Recorded: 1978
- Genre: Rock
- Length: 3:55
- Label: Vertigo (UK); Warner Bros. (U.S.)
- Songwriter: Mark Knopfler
- Producer: Muff Winwood

"Down to the Waterline" is a 1978 song written by Mark Knopfler and first released by Dire Straits as the first song on their debut album, Dire Straits. It was also included on the demo tape that the band sent to Charlie Gillett, which led to their first recording contract. It was subsequently released as the B-side of the "Water of Love" single.

== Lyrics and music ==
The lyrics of "Down to the Waterline" tell of a brief sexual tryst. According to Mark Knopfler's brother and fellow Dire Straits member David, the song's imagery is based on Mark's memories of walking along the River Tyne at night under the lights with his girlfriend when he was a teenager.

News and Courier contributor Joel McNally describes how "the band appears out of the fog" to start the song, noting that the effect is "not hokey." Hartford Courant critic J. Greg Robertson describes the beginning of the song saying "the soft, haunting electric guitar and cymbals introduction abruptly switches into a forceful and melody and another of [Mark] Knopfler's carefully articulated Reed-like vocals." High Fidelity also commented on the song's "tender, passionate, and yet unsentimental" erotic imagery. Hi-Fi News & Record Review described the song as "bouncy and punchy." The Rolling Stone Album Guide commented on the song's "galloping groove."

Montreal Gazette critic Bubert Bauch claims that "Once Upon a Time in the West", the song that opened Dire Straits' second album, Communiqué, sounded very similar to "Down to the Waterline", which opened their debut album. News-Pilot critic Warren Robak also pointed out similarities – both are "lively [ballads] about a love that was" which begin with "a quivering guitar introduction and then [go] off into some smooth guitar licks."

== Personnel ==
- Mark Knopfler – vocals, lead and rhythm guitars
- David Knopfler – rhythm guitar
- John Illsley – bass
- Pick Withers – drums

== Reception ==
Classic Rock critic Paul Rees rated "Down to the Waterline" to be Dire Straits' 9th greatest song, citing "Mark Knopfler’s ringing guitar and nicotine-laced vocals, his cinematic lyrics and the rhythm section's effortless shuffle." Classic Rock History critic Brian Kachejian rated it Dire Straits' 7th best song. Cary Darling of Billboard praised the song as superior to the other love songs on side 1 of Dire Straits, including "Water of Love." Darling praised the lyrics as "incisive" but "never cliched." Darling also praised the moody foghorn sound that opens the song, Knopfler's "quick finger picking" guitar playing and the tightness of the band on this song.

"Down to the Waterline" later appeared on Dire Straits live album Live at the BBC and on the Dire Straits "Best of" compilation album Money for Nothing.

== Certifications ==
Certifications for "Down to the Waterline"
Region	Certification	Certified units/sales
New Zealand (RMNZ)	Platinum	30,000^{‡}
^{‡} Sales+streaming figures based on certification alone.
