= Brothers in Arms (album) =

1985 studio album by Dire Straits

Studio album by Dire Straits
- Released: 17 May 1985
- Recorded: November 1984 – February 1985
- Studios: AIR (Salem, Montserrat); Power Station (New York City)
- Genre: Pop rock
- Length: 55:11 (CD, cassette and double LP); 45:40 (vinyl)
- Labels: Vertigo; Warner Bros.
- Producers: Neil Dorfsman; Mark Knopfler

Dire Straits chronology
Alchemy (1984)	Brothers in Arms (1985)	Money for Nothing (1988)

Singles from Brothers in Arms
- 1. "So Far Away" Released: 12 April 1985; 2. "Money for Nothing" Released: 28 June 1985; 3. "Walk of Life" Released: 14 October 1985 (US); 4. "Brothers in Arms" Released: 18 October 1985 (UK); 5. "Your Latest Trick" Released: 25 April 1986

Brothers in Arms is the fifth studio album by the British rock band Dire Straits, released on 17 May 1985, by Vertigo Records internationally and Warner Bros. Records in the United States. It was the first album in history to sell over one million copies in CD format. The album was produced by bandleader Mark Knopfler and by Neil Dorfsman, who had engineered Dire Straits' 1982 album Love over Gold and Knopfler's 1983 soundtrack album Local Hero.

Brothers in Arms spent a total of 14 non-consecutive weeks at number one on the UK Albums Chart (including ten consecutive weeks between 18 January and 22 March 1986), nine weeks at number one on the Billboard 200 in the United States and 34 weeks at number one on the Australian Albums Chart. It was the first album to be certified ten-times platinum in the UK and is the eighth-best-selling album in UK chart history. It is certified nine-times platinum in the United States by the Recording Industry Association of America (RIAA) and is one of the world's best-selling albums, having sold more than 30 million copies worldwide. To promote the album, Dire Straits embarked on the Brothers in Arms Tour, which ran from 1985 to 1986.

The album won a Grammy Award in 1986 for Best Engineered Album, Non-Classical and Best British Album at the 1987 Brit Awards; the 20th Anniversary reissue won another Grammy in 2006 for Best Surround Sound Album. In 2020, Rolling Stone magazine ranked Brothers in Arms number 418 on its list of the "500 Greatest Albums of All Time". Q magazine ranked it number 51 on its list of the "100 Greatest British Albums Ever".

In 2025, to commemorate the 40th anniversary of the album’s original release, the album was re-released in several formats, including a five-LP box set and triple CD. This box set included the full studio album as well as a previously unreleased full-length live concert from the band’s Municipal Auditorium, San Antonio show during the world tour.

== Recording ==
=== Initial recording sessions (and departure of Hal Lindes) ===
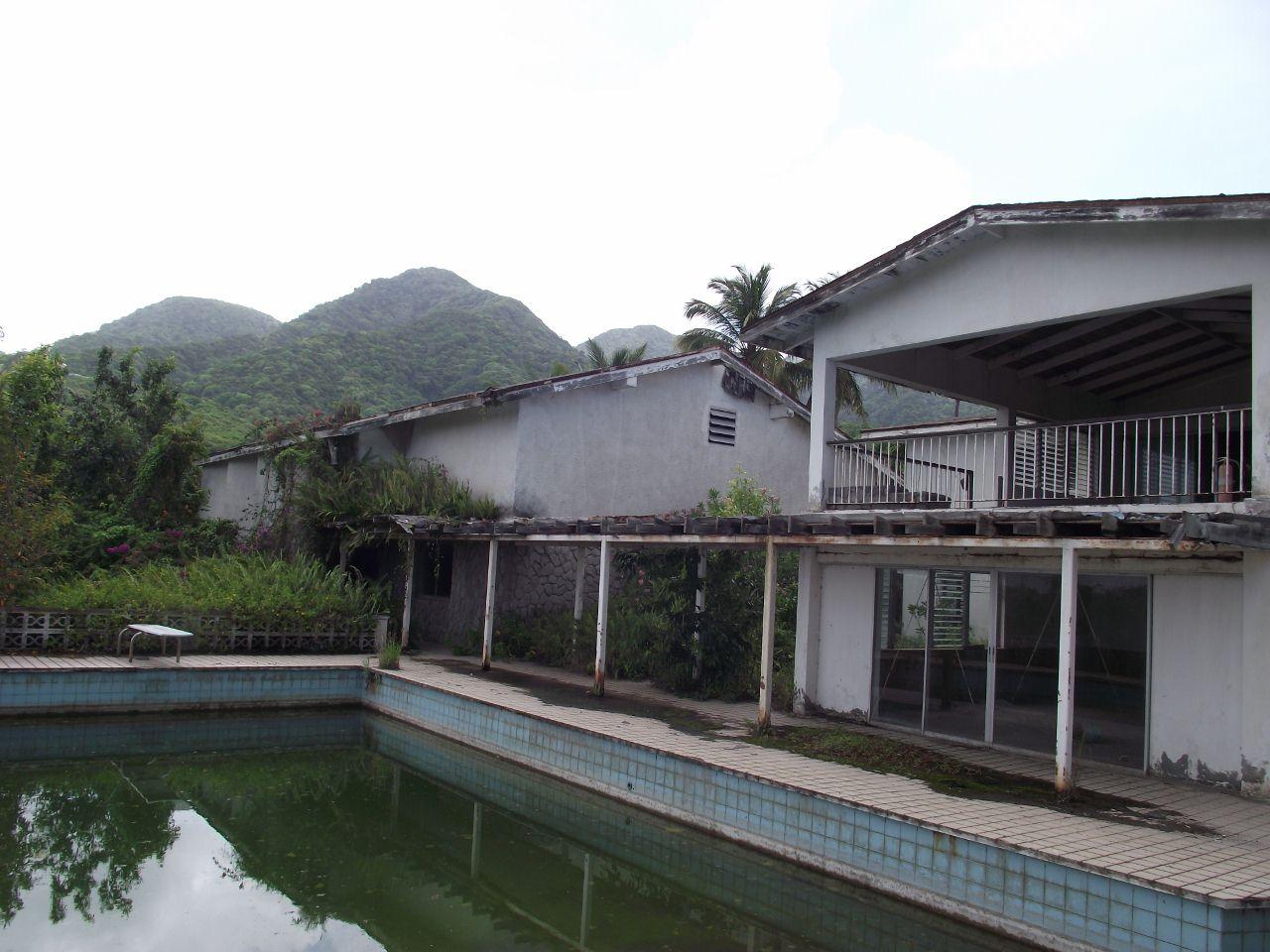
Brothers in Arms was recorded at the now-abandoned AIR Studios in Montserrat (pictured in 2013), frequented by many famous artists and bands in the late 1970s and 1980s.

The initial recording sessions for Brothers in Arms took place between 2 November and 21 December 1984 at AIR Studios on the island of Montserrat, a British overseas territory in the Caribbean. Before arriving at Montserrat, Knopfler had written all the songs and rehearsed them with the band; which, at the time of recording, was himself (vocals, guitar), John Illsley (bass, backing vocals), Hal Lindes (guitar), Alan Clark (piano, organ), Terry Williams (drums) and new member Guy Fletcher (synthesisers, backing vocals).

The studio itself was small, with a 20-by-25-foot (6 m × 8 m) recording space that offered virtually no isolation. "It was a good-sounding studio," Dorfsman later recalled, "but the main room itself was nothing to write home about. The sound of that studio was the desk," referring to the Neve 8078 board. Knopfler and Dorfsman utilised the main studio's limited space to best effect, placing the drum kit in the far left corner, facing the control room. They placed the piano in a tight booth in the far right corner, miked with AKG C414s. The Hammond B3 was placed nearby, with its Leslie speaker either wedged into the soundproof entryway to the control room or even set up outdoors. Illsley's bass amplifier was recorded inside a small vocal booth with a Neumann FET 47 and a DI unit. Knopfler's amplifiers were miked with 57s, 451s, and Neumann U67s. Fletcher's synths were placed in the control room.

Brothers in Arms was one of the first albums recorded on a Sony 24-track digital tape machine. The decision to move to digital recording came from Knopfler's constant striving for better sound quality. "One of the things that I totally respected about him," Dorfsman observed, "was his interest in technology as a means of improving his music. He was always willing to spend on high-quality equipment." However, they encountered a defective batch of recording tape at AIR Studios, which would result in the loss of part or all of three album tracks.

Hal Lindes left the band early in the sessions. According to Illsley, this was due to social disagreements, with Lindes spending too much time with his girlfriend (and future wife) and not enough with the rest of the band, leading to questions about his commitment. As had been the case with the earlier recording of Making Movies, Knopfler then took on the recording the majority of guitar parts himself.

During the recording of "Money for Nothing", the signature sound of Knopfler's guitar may have been enhanced by a "happy accident" of microphone placement. Knopfler was using his Gibson Les Paul going through a Laney amplifier. While setting up the guitar amplifier microphones in an effort to get the "ZZ Top sound" that Knopfler sought, guitar tech Ron Eve, who was in the control room, heard the "amazing" sound before Dorfsman was finished arranging the mics. "One mic was pointing down at the floor," Dorfsman remembered, "another was not quite on the speaker, another was somewhere else, and it wasn't how I would want to set things up—it was probably just left from the night before, when I'd been preparing things for the next day and had not really finished the setup." What they heard was exactly what ended up on the record; no additional touches were made during the mix.

=== Issues with drumming (Terry Williams and Omar Hakim); recruitment of Jack Sonni ===
In December 1984, six weeks into the recording sessions in Montserrat, the drum parts became an issue and Terry Williams was dismissed from the sessions. According to a later Sound on Sound magazine interview with Neil Dorfsman, he and Knopfler had decided that Williams' performances were unsuitable for the desired sound and feel of the album. Illsley, however, recalled in 1985 that it was Williams' studio nerves that made it difficult to record the best rhythm tracks as a band. Williams himself, meanwhile, has claimed that he had recorded all his drum parts to a click track, which he felt limited his playing and feel in the studio. While accounts vary, it became clear that the drum parts for the album were not progressing. Williams was promptly replaced in the sessions by jazz and session drummer Omar Hakim, who recorded his drum parts in three days. Hakim recalled that all the album tracks, apart from "Money for Nothing", were re-cut from scratch as a band alongside Knopfler and Illsley.

On the eventual release of the album, both Hakim and Williams were credited with drumming. Williams’ contributions on the album are limited to "Walk of Life" and the improvised drum crescendo at the beginning of "Money for Nothing", with Hakim playing all remaining parts on this and the album's other tracks. According to another interview with Dorfsman, Williams' original toms and tom fills throughout "Money for Nothing" were retained, with Hakim playing the rest of the drum parts. However, Williams was not dismissed from the band: he featured as drummer in all the music videos and throughout the 1985–1986 Brothers in Arms world tour that followed.

Shortly before Christmas 1984, during a break in the recording schedule, Knopfler approached and recruited Jack Sonni, a New York guitarist and longstanding friend, for the rhythm guitar position vacated by Hal Lindes the previous month. Subsequently, after the Christmas break, a second set of recording sessions took place in Montserrat between 3 January and 6 February 1985. Sting also recorded vocals for "Money for Nothing" during the first week of January, while he was on vacation in Montserrat. Coincidentally, Omar Hakim met Sting for the first time during the "Money For Nothing" session while laying down drum parts, eventually landing the gig as drummer in the latter's backing band for The Dream of the Blue Turtles album and tour.

=== New York sessions, 1985 (including bass guitar substitutions) ===
Subsequently, the album sessions relocated to the Power Station in New York in February 1985 for additional overdubs. These included contributions from New York musicians including Michael and Randy Brecker on saxophone and trumpet, Mike Mainieri on tuned percussion (who had previously contributed vibraphone to Love Over Gold) and percussionist Jimmy Maelen, plus trumpeter Dave Plews and Average White Band saxophonist Malcolm Duncan.

When Illsley sprained his wrist after a fall whilst jogging in Central Park, rendering him unable to play, the band hired studio bassists Tony Levin and Neil Jason to complete the bass parts. Neil Jason was brought in for a week's work which included takes on "So Far Away", "Walk of Life", "Ride Across the River", "Your Latest Trick" and "The Man's Too Strong", although the only fully confirmed released results from the Jason sessions were the slap-style funk bassline on "One World" and "slides on my fretless—almost like a Syndrum effect" on the intro to the extended version of "Money for Nothing". Levin contributed bass parts to "Why Worry". Jack Sonni also recorded his only contribution to a Dire Straits album, playing some guitar synthesiser parts on "The Man's Too Strong".

== Supporting tour, 1985–1986 ==
Dire Straits began their promotional concert world tour on 25 April 1985 in Split, Croatia (then part of Yugoslavia), with Sonni now a full-time member on rhythm guitar and Williams back on drums.

The tour was phenomenally successful, lasting a whole year and concluding in April 1986, in which the band played a total of 248 concerts in 23 countries and 118 cities. More than two and a half million people attended the tour. This also concluded Jack Sonni's time as a Dire Straits member: he would not be present for the band's very occasional performances during the following two years' hiatus, and was not involved with the next album, On Every Street, or its accompanying world tour.

== Composition ==
Brothers in Arms has been described musically as a pop rock album. The music video for "Money for Nothing" received heavy rotation on MTV, and it was the first to be aired on MTV Europe when the network launched on 1 August 1987. It is one of only two Dire Straits songs on a studio album not to be solely credited to Knopfler (the other being "The Carousel Waltz", which opens Making Movies), with guest vocalist Sting given a co-writing credit due to the melody of the repeated "I want my MTV" (sung by Sting) at the start echoing the melody of the Police's "Don't Stand So Close to Me".

"Walk of Life" was a number two hit in the UK Singles Chart in early 1986 and a number seven hit in the US Billboard Hot 100 later that year. The song was nearly left off the album, but was included after the band out-voted producer Neil Dorfsman.

On the second side of the album, three songs ("Ride Across the River", "The Man's Too Strong" and "Brothers in Arms") are lyrically focused on militarism. "Ride Across the River" uses immersive Latin American imagery, accompanied by synthesised pan flute, mariachi trumpet, a reggae-influenced drum part and eerie background noises including synthesized cricket chirps. "The Man's Too Strong" depicts the character of an ancient soldier (or war criminal) and his fear of showing feelings as a weakness. Written during the 1982 Falklands War, "Brothers in Arms" deals with the senselessness of war.

In 2007, the 25th anniversary of the war, Knopfler recorded a new version of the song at Abbey Road Studios to raise funds for British veterans who he said "are still suffering from the effects of that conflict".

== Artwork ==
The guitar featured on the front of the album cover is Mark Knopfler's 1937 14-fret National Style "O" Resonator. The Style "O" line of guitars was introduced in 1930 and discontinued in 1941. The photographer was Deborah Feingold. The back cover features a painting of the same guitar, by German artist Thomas Steyer. A similar image was also used, with a similar colour scheme, for the 1989 album The Booze Brothers by Brewers Droop, which features Knopfler on a few tracks.

== Release ==
Brothers in Arms was one of the first albums directed at the CD market, and it was a full digital recording (DDD) at a time when most popular music was recorded on analog equipment. It was also released on vinyl (abridged to fit on one LP) and cassette.

Brothers in Arms was the first album to sell one million copies in the CD format and to outsell its LP version. Rykodisc co-founder Rob Simonds subsequently wrote, "[In 1985] we were fighting to get our CDs manufactured because the entire worldwide manufacturing capacity was overwhelmed by demand for a single rock title (Dire Straits' Brothers in Arms)."

It was remastered and reissued with the rest of the Dire Straits catalogue in 1996 for most of the world outside the United States, and on 19 September 2000 in the United States. The remastering for both reissues was done by Bob Ludwig at Gateway Mastering using the Super Bit Mapping process. In 2000, it was released on XRCD2 format, remastered by Hiromichi Takiguchi using K2 20bit technology. A 20th-anniversary edition was issued on Super Audio CD on 26 July 2005 (becoming the 3000th title for the SACD format), featuring a 5.1 surround sound remix done by Chuck Ainlay at British Grove Studios. It was mastered by Bob Ludwig at Gateway Mastering. The 5.1 mix was also released on DualDisc format with DVD-Audio 24 bit/96 kHz track on 16 August 2005. Ainlay's 5.1 remix won a Grammy for Best Surround Sound Album at the 48th Grammy Awards ceremony. In 2006, a half-speed–mastered vinyl version of the album was issued. Mastered by Stan Ricker, this version consists of four sides on two 33 1/3 rpm discs, containing the full-length songs on vinyl for the first time. In 2013, Mobile Fidelity Sound Lab released a hybrid SACD mastered from the original tapes by Shawn R. Britton. It includes the original stereo mix only. In 2014, a new master was released in Japan on SHM-SACD – it is made from the original analogue master tapes and contains the original LP length of the album: 47:44. This edition was transferred by Mick McKenna and Richard Whittaker at FX Copyroom using Direct Stream Digital.

On 19 May 2014, Vertigo reissued the album on double 180g vinyl; this edition contains the full-length songs. It was mastered by Bob Ludwig, Bernie Grundman and Chris Bellman from the original analogue and digital tapes, and was also included on The Studio Albums 1978–1991 the previous year. In 2015, Mobile Fidelity also released the album on double 45 RPM vinyl, which was mastered by Krieg Wunderlich. The same year, the album re-entered the UK Albums Chart at number 8 following the record being made available at a discounted price on digital music retailers. In March 2021, a new half-speed mastered edition was released, mastered at Abbey Road Studios by Miles Showell. The release was a double-LP, 45 rpm, 180 gram edition, with the complete version of the album, for only the second time (the first being issued by Mobile Fidelity Sound Lab in 2015).

The album has spent a total of 356 weeks on the UK Albums Chart.

On 16 May 2025, the 40th anniversary of the album’s original release, the album was re-released issued on Blu-ray with Dolby Atmos and 24 bit/96KHz version of the original CD and vinyl mixes. It was also re-released as a five-LP box set and triple CD. This edition included the full studio album as well as a previously unreleased full-length live concert from 16 August 1985, at the band’s Municipal Auditorium, San Antonio during the promotional concert world tour, the first time that a full-length concert from the 1985–86 tour has been made available on album.

== Critical reception ==
Professional ratings
Review scores
Source	Rating
AllMusic	4/5 stars
Christgau's Record Guide	B−
Encyclopedia of Popular Music	3/5 stars
The Great Rock Discography	8/10
MusicHound	4/5
Pitchfork	8.6/10
Q	5/5 stars
Record Mirror	1/5 stars
The Rolling Stone Album Guide	4.5/5 stars
Sounds	3/5 stars

=== Contemporary ===
Initial reviews of Brothers in Arms from the UK music press in 1985 were generally negative. In a scathing review for NME, Mat Snow criticised Knopfler's "mawkish self-pity, his lugubriously mannered appropriation of rockin' Americana, his thumpingly crass attempts at wit". He also accused the album of the "tritest would-be melodies in history, the last word in tranquilising chord changes, the most cloying lonesome playing and ultimate in transparently fake troubador sentiment ever to ooze out of a million-dollar recording studio". Eleanor Levy of Record Mirror dismissed the "West Coast guitars reeking of mega bucks and sell out stadium concerts throughout the globe. Laid back melodies. Dire Straits – summed up ... This is like any other Dire Straits album quarried out of the tottering edifice of MOR rock."

The reviews from other UK music papers were less harsh, with Jack Barron of Sounds feeling that "it's only a halfway decent album because it has only halfway decent songs. ... Knopfler has distilled his sonic essence, via blues, to appeal to billboard romantics with cinemascope insecurities. And he can pull it off well... but not often enough here." Melody Maker's Barry McIlheney observed that Knopfler had recently explored different creative directions with his work on movie soundtracks and on Bob Dylan's Infidels, and bemoaned that "this admirable spirit of adventure fails to materialise ... Instead it sounds just a bit too like the last Dire Straits album, which sounded not unlike the last one before that, which sounded suspiciously like the beginning of a hugely successful and very lucrative plan to take over the world known as AOR". He concluded, "the old rockschool restraints and the undeniably attractive smell of the winning formula seem to block out any such experimental work and what you end up with is something very like the same old story".

US reviews were more positive. Writing for Spin magazine, E. Brooks praised Knopfler's guitar work and noted that "when the intensity of his words approaches that of his ravishing stratocaster licks, the song soars. That doesn't happen as often as I'd like on this new album [...] but I find myself returning to certain cuts the way one might come back to a favorite chair." Brooks singled out the "haunting ballad" "Your Latest Trick", the "acerbic satire of vid-rock culture" in "Money for Nothing" and the "outstanding craftsmanship in the words and music" of the title track, which was "not a new message, but at least something other than sex, cars, or drugs is being talked about here. Take that and the quality of the musicianship, and you've got a lot." Debby Bull gave the album a mixed review for Rolling Stone magazine, praising the "carefully crafted" effort, writing, "The record is beautifully produced, with Mark Knopfler's terrific guitar work catching the best light". Although she found the lyrics literate, Bull noted that the scenarios "aren't as interesting as they used to be on records like Making Movies". Despite the production values and notable contributions from guest artists like drummer Omar Hakim and the Brecker Brothers, Bull concluded that "the music lacks the ache that made Knopfler's recent soundtracks for Comfort and Joy and Cal so powerful." In Rolling Stone's end-of-year round-up of 1985's key albums, Fred Schruers said that "Knopfler's nimble, evocative guitar style and gentle vocalizing are still as appealing as they were on previous scenario-rich albums".

=== Retrospective ===
In 1996, British music journalist Robert Sandall wrote:

Looked at now with 20/20 vision of hindsight, the image on the sleeve of Brothers in Arms seems uncannily prophetic: that National steel guitar heading up into the clouds—a shiny 6 stringed rocket devoid of any obvious means of propulsion—describes, better than any words can, what happened to Dire Straits after the release of their 5th studio album. Up till the summer of 1985 success had, for them, come as a by-product of the music making process. They had never courted celebrity, chased fads, or played safe. Dire Straits had been loved and respected as one of the few bands to have maintained strong and credible links with the multifarious roots of rock and roll at a time—remember all the desperate pop posing of the early 80s?—when roots were emphatically not a fashionable place to be.

Reviewing the remastered Dire Straits albums in 1996, Rob Beattie of Q awarded Brothers in Arms five stars out of five and wrote that "repeated listening reveals it as a singularly melancholic collection – see the guitar slashing of 'The Man's Too Strong' and the title track, where joy is as sharp as sorrow". In a 2007 review for BBC Music, Chris Jones called Brothers in Arms "a phenomenon on every level... a suite of Knopfler's very fine brand of JJ Cale-lite". In his retrospective review for AllMusic, Stephen Thomas Erlewine gave the album four out of five stars, crediting the international success of the album not only to the clever computer-animated video for "Money for Nothing", but also to Knopfler's "increased sense of pop songcraft". According to Erlewine, Dire Straits had "never been so concise or pop-oriented, and it wore well on them". Erlewine concluded that the album remains "one of their most focused and accomplished albums, and in its succinct pop sense, it's distinctive within their catalog".

In 2010, when Brothers in Arms was among ten albums nominated for the best British album of the past 30 years by the Brit Awards, music broadcaster and author Paul Gambaccini described the list of nominees as "risible" but added, "Brothers in Arms runs away with it for the quality of songwriting and musicianship."

In 2018, Classic Rock wrote that Brothers in Arms "made Dire Straits superstars, but it also warped the popular perception of both Knopfler and his band. Dire Straits became a byword for a certain sort of safe, homogenised music, and Knopfler was turned into a caricature of the middle-aged rocker, with jacket sleeves rolled up and wearing a headband [...] It wasn't even as if he had contrived to make a blockbuster. In large part it was hushed and melancholy, a sigh rather than a roar. But it was damned by having its signature single explode out of context."

=== Accolades ===
Brothers in Arms won Best British Album at the 1987 Brit Awards (in a first-time occurrence, it had actually been nominated for Best Album a year earlier at the 1986 Brit Awards but lost to Phil Collins' No Jacket Required, before being nominated again the following year due to its chart longevity). Also in 1986, the album won a Grammy Award for Best Engineered Album, Non-Classical, while the 20th Anniversary Edition won another Grammy in 2006 for Best Surround Sound Album.

In 2000, Q magazine placed the album at number 51 in its list of the 100 Greatest British Albums Ever. In 2003, the album ranked number 351 on Rolling Stone magazine's list of the "500 Greatest Albums of All Time", and number 352 in a 2012 revised list, and number 418 in the 2020 revision. The album was also included in the book 1001 Albums You Must Hear Before You Die.

In November 2006 the results of a national poll conducted by the public of Australia revealed their top 100 favourite albums. Brothers in Arms came in at number 64 (see "My Favourite Album"). Brothers in Arms is ranked number three in the best albums of 1985 and number 31 in the best albums of the 1980s.

As of July 2016 Brothers in Arms is the eighth-best-selling album of all-time in the UK. In the Netherlands, the album held the record for longest run ever on the Dutch Album chart with 269 weeks (non-consecutive) but was surpassed by Adele's album 21 in 2016.

Awards and nominations

Nominations for Brothers in Arms
Year	Ceremony	Nominated work	Recipient(s)	Category	Result
1986	Brit Awards	Brothers in Arms	Dire Straits	Best British Album	Nominated
1986	Grammy Awards	Brothers in Arms	Dire Straits; Neil Dorfsman and Mark Knopfler, producers	Album of the Year	Nominated
1986	Grammy Awards	Brothers in Arms	Neil Dorfsman, engineer	Best Engineered Album, Non-Classical	Won
1986	Juno Awards	Brothers in Arms	Dire Straits	Best Selling International Album	Won
1987	Brit Awards	Brothers in Arms	Dire Straits	Best British Album	Won
2006	Grammy Awards	Brothers in Arms (20th Anniversary Edition)	Chuck Ainlay, surround mix engineer; Bob Ludwig, surround mastering engineer; Chuck Ainlay and Mark Knopfler, surround producer	Best Surround Sound Album	Won

== Track listings ==
All songs written by Mark Knopfler, except "Money for Nothing", written by Knopfler and Sting. The CD and cassette versions feature full versions of "So Far Away", "Money for Nothing", "Your Latest Trick" and "Why Worry". Because of this, side two of the cassette version has about 10 minutes of blank tape. CDs 2 and 3 of the 40th Anniversary Edition were recorded on 16 August 1985 at the Municipal Auditorium, San Antonio, Texas.

=== Original edition (1985) ===
Brothers in Arms CD and cassette track listing
No.	Title	Cassette No.	Length
1.	"So Far Away"	A1	5:12
2.	"Money for Nothing"	A2	8:25
3.	"Walk of Life"	A3	4:12
4.	"Your Latest Trick"	A4	6:33
5.	"Why Worry"	A5	8:31
6.	"Ride Across the River"	B1	6:58
7.	"The Man's Too Strong"	B2	4:40
8.	"One World"	B3	3:40
9.	"Brothers in Arms"	B4	7:00
Total length:			55:15

Single LP track listing

Side one
No.	Title	Length
1.	"So Far Away"	3:59
2.	"Money for Nothing"	7:04
3.	"Walk of Life"	4:12
4.	"Your Latest Trick"	4:46
5.	"Why Worry"	5:22
Total length:		25:23

Side two
No.	Title	Length
1.	"Ride Across the River"	6:58
2.	"The Man's Too Strong"	4:40
3.	"One World"	3:40
4.	"Brothers in Arms"	7:00
Total length:		22:19 47:42

=== 40th Anniversary Edition (2025) ===
CD 1 track listing • Brothers in Arms
No.	Title	Length
1.	"So Far Away"	5:12
2.	"Money for Nothing"	8:25
3.	"Walk of Life"	4:12
4.	"Your Latest Trick"	6:33
5.	"Why Worry"	8:31
6.	"Ride Across the River"	6:58
7.	"The Man's Too Strong"	4:40
8.	"One World"	3:40
9.	"Brothers in Arms"	7:00
Total length:		55:15

CD 2 track listing • San Antonio – Live In 1985
No.	Title	Length
1.	"Ride Across the River"	10:32
2.	"Expresso Love"	6:43
3.	"One World"	5:06
4.	"Romeo and Juliet"	10:30
5.	"Private Investigations"	8:12
6.	"Sultans of Swing"	13:18
7.	"Why Worry"	5:17
Total length:		59:38

CD 3 track listing • San Antonio – Live In 1985
No.	Title	Length
8.	"Walk of Life"	4:31
9.	"Two Young Lovers"	5:00
10.	"Money for Nothing"	8:02
11.	"Wild West End"	9:16
12.	"Tunnel of Love"	19:26
13.	"Brothers in Arms"	8:37
14.	"Solid Rock"	4:36
15.	"Going Home"	5:12
Total length:		1:04:40

== Personnel ==
Credits adapted from album liner notes.

Dire Straits

- Mark Knopfler – guitars, vocals
- John Illsley – bass, vocals
- Alan Clark – piano, Hammond organ
- Guy Fletcher – Yamaha DX1 synthesizer, Synclavier, Roland synthesizers, vocals
- Terry Williams – drums intro on "Money for Nothing"
- Jack Sonni – guitar synth on "The Man's Too Strong"

Additional musicians

- Michael Brecker – saxophone on "Your Latest Trick"
- Randy Brecker – trumpet on "Your Latest Trick"
- Malcolm Duncan – saxophone
- Omar Hakim – drums, tambourine and cowbell
- Neil Jason – bass on "One World"
- Tony Levin – Chapman Stick on "Why Worry"
- Jimmy Maelen – shaker and tambourine
- Mike Mainieri – vibes on "Why Worry"
- Dave Plews – trumpet on "Ride Across the River"
- Sting – vocals on "Money for Nothing"

Production

- Mark Knopfler – producer
- Neil Dorfsman – producer, engineer, mixing
- Dave Greenberg – assistant engineer
- Steve Jackson – assistant engineer
- Bruce Lampcov – assistant engineer
- Bob Ludwig – mastering at Masterdisk (New York City, New York, USA)
- John Dent – mastering at The Sound Clinic (London, UK)
- Thomas Steyer – cover painting
- Sutton Cooper – sleeve design
- Deborah Feingold – photography

== Charts ==
- In the Netherlands, the album broke the all-time record for most weeks on chart, with 269 non-consecutive weeks (since overtaken by Adele's 21 and the Buena Vista Social Club's eponymous debut album).
- In the UK, the album spent 14 weeks at number one on the UK Albums Chart, and as of August 2018 has spent 271 weeks on the chart.
- In the United States, the album reached number one on the Billboard 200 and remained there for nine weeks.

=== Weekly charts ===
Weekly chart performance for Brothers in Arms
Chart (1985–2026)	Peak position
Australian Albums (Kent Music Report)	1
Austrian Albums (Ö3 Austria)	1
Belgian Albums (Ultratop Flanders)	8
Belgian Albums (Ultratop Wallonia)	7
Canada Top Albums/CDs (RPM)	1
Croatian International Albums (HDU)	16
Dutch Albums (Album Top 100)	1
European Albums (Eurotipsheet)	1
Finnish Albums (Suomen virallinen lista)	1
French Albums (SNEP)	1
German Albums (Offizielle Top 100)	1
Hungarian Albums (MAHASZ)	25
Italian Albums (FIMI)	4
New Zealand Albums (RMNZ)	1
Norwegian Albums (VG-lista)	1
Norwegian Rock Albums (IFPI Norge)	4
Polish Albums (ZPAV)	14
Portuguese Albums (AFP)	13
Spanish Albums (AFYVE)	1
Swedish Albums (Sverigetopplistan)	1
Swiss Albums (Schweizer Hitparade)	1
UK Albums (Official Charts)	1
US Billboard 200	1

=== Year-end charts ===
1985 year-end chart performance for Brothers in Arms
Chart (1985)	Position
Australian Albums (Kent Music Report)	1
Austrian Albums (Ö3 Austria)	6
Canada Top Albums/CDs (RPM)	3
Dutch Albums (Album Top 100)	3
European Albums (Eurotipsheet)	1
German Albums (Offizielle Top 100)	7
New Zealand Albums (RMNZ)	3
Norwegian Autumn Period Albums (VG-lista)	3
Norwegian Summer Period Albums (VG-lista)	1
Swiss Albums (Schweizer Hitparade)	2
UK Albums (Gallup)	1
US Billboard 200	27

1986 year-end chart performance for Brothers in Arms
Chart (1986)	Position
Australian Albums (Kent Music Report)	2
Austrian Albums (Ö3 Austria)	2
Canada Top Albums/CDs (RPM)	3
Dutch Albums (Album Top 100)	4
European Albums (Music & Media)	2
German Albums (Offizielle Top 100)	3
New Zealand Albums (RMNZ)	1
Swiss Albums (Schweizer Hitparade)	2
UK Albums (Gallup)	2
US Billboard 200	5

1987 year-end chart performance for Brothers in Arms
Chart (1987)	Position
Dutch Albums (Album Top 100)	4
European Albums (Music & Media)	11
German Albums (Offizielle Top 100)	16
UK Albums (Gallup)	36

1988 year-end chart performance for Brothers in Arms
Chart (1988)	Position
UK Albums (Gallup)	63

2019 year-end chart performance for Brothers in Arms
Chart (2019)	Position
Belgian Albums (Ultratop Flanders)	137
Swedish Albums (Sverigetopplistan)	80

2020 year-end chart performance for Brothers in Arms
Chart (2020)	Position
Belgian Albums (Ultratop Flanders)	89
Swedish Albums (Sverigetopplistan)	72

2021 year-end chart performance for Brothers in Arms
Chart (2021)	Position
Belgian Albums (Ultratop Flanders)	88
Dutch Albums (Album Top 100)	79
Swedish Albums (Sverigetopplistan)	86

2022 year-end chart performance for Brothers in Arms
Chart (2022)	Position
Belgian Albums (Ultratop Flanders)	114
Dutch Albums (Album Top 100)	61
Swedish Albums (Sverigetopplistan)	88

2023 year-end chart performance for Brothers in Arms
Chart (2023)	Position
Belgian Albums (Ultratop Flanders)	120
Dutch Albums (Album Top 100)	59
Swedish Albums (Sverigetopplistan)	63

2024 year-end chart performance for Brothers in Arms
Chart (2024)	Position
Belgian Albums (Ultratop Flanders)	98
Dutch Albums (Album Top 100)	49
Swedish Albums (Sverigetopplistan)	54

2025 year-end chart performance for Brothers in Arms
Chart (2025)	Position
Belgian Albums (Ultratop Flanders)	53
Belgian Albums (Ultratop Wallonia)	155
Dutch Albums (Album Top 100)	29
German Albums (Offizielle Top 100)	77
Icelandic Albums (Tónlistinn)	78
Swedish Albums (Sverigetopplistan)	34

=== Decade-end charts ===
Decade-end chart performance for Brothers in Arms
Chart (1980–1989)	Position
Australian Albums (Kent Music Report)	2
UK Albums (OCC)	1

== Certifications and sales ==
Certifications and sales for Brothers in Arms
Region	Certification	Certified units/sales
Argentina (CAPIF)	Gold	30,000^{^}
Australia (ARIA)	17× Platinum	1,240,000
Austria (IFPI Austria)	4× Platinum	200,000^{*}
Belgium (BRMA)	4× Platinum	200,000^{‡}
Brazil (Pro-Música Brasil)	3× Platinum	750,000
Canada (Music Canada)	Diamond	1,000,000^{^}
Denmark (IFPI Danmark)	7× Platinum	140,000^{‡}
Finland (Musiikkituottajat)	2× Platinum	116,784
France (SNEP)	Diamond	2,000,000
Germany (BVMI)	Platinum	500,000^{^}
Hong Kong (IFPI Hong Kong)	Platinum	20,000^{*}
Italy (FIMI) sales 1985-1987	Platinum	200,000
Italy (FIMI) sales since 2009	2× Platinum	100,000^{‡}
Netherlands	—	470,387
New Zealand (RMNZ)	24× Platinum	360,000^{^}
Poland (ZPAV)	Platinum	20,000^{‡}
South Africa	—	100,000
Spain (Promusicae)	3× Platinum	300,000^{^}
Sweden (GLF)	Gold	50,000^{^}
Switzerland (IFPI Switzerland)	6× Platinum	300,000^{^}
Switzerland (IFPI Switzerland) 1996 release	Platinum	50,000^{^}
United Kingdom (BPI)	15× Platinum	4,500,000^{‡}
United States (RIAA)	9× Platinum	9,000,000^{^}
Zimbabwe	—	5,000
Summaries
Worldwide	—	30,000,000
^{*} Sales figures based on certification alone.^{^} Shipments figures based on certification alone.^{‡} Sales+streaming figures based on certification alone.

== See also ==
- List of best-selling albums
- List of best-selling albums in the United Kingdom
- List of best-selling albums in Australia
- List of best-selling albums in Austria
- List of best-selling albums in France
- List of best-selling albums in New Zealand
