= Water of Love =

Single by Dire Straits

from the album Dire Straits
- B-side: "Down to the Waterline"
- Released: October 1978
- Recorded: 1978
- Genre: Blues rock
- Length: 5:23
- Label: Vertigo Records; Warner Bros. Records (U.S.)
- Songwriter: Mark Knopfler
- Producer: Muff Winwood

Dire Straits singles chronology
| "Sultans of Swing" (1978) | "Water of Love" (1978) | "Lady Writer" (1979) |

"Water of Love" is a song written by Mark Knopfler and originally released on Dire Straits' self-titled debut album. It was also released as a single in the Netherlands in October 1978 and in Australia in December 1978 as a follow-up to the band's first single "Sultans of Swing". The single reached number 28 in the Netherlands and number 54 in Australia. The song was also included on Dire Straits live album Live at the BBC and on the multi-artist compilation album More Than Unplugged.

== Background and composition ==
Both "Water of Love" and "Down to the Waterline," as well as "Sultans of Swing," were among the five songs included on Dire Straits' demo tape that the band sent to Charlie Gillett, who played the tape on his radio show leading to the band's first recording contract. It is one of four songs on side 1 of the Dire Straits album which deals with unhappy relationships, and author Michael Oldfield believes that the song is basically about the break-up of Mark Knopfler's marriage. Knopfler described "Water of Love" as one of his songs that came entirely from inside himself rather than putting himself in someone else's shoes. He stated that he wrote it because "I was so fed up. I felt I was going no place. I could see my future stretching out in front of me long and bleak."

On the Dire Straits live album Live at the BBC, as an introduction to the song they are about to perform, Knopfler, with his signature deadpan humour, is heard saying, "Okay, well, uh, this is a song called 'Water of Love'. It is a... a strange idea but it's maybe one that you want to think about, a lot..."

== Critical reception ==
Writing in Rolling Stone, Ken Tucker used the song as an example of Knopfler's penchant for mixing clever lines with prosaic ones. Tucker gives as an example the clever line "I need a little water of love" followed by "You know it's evil when you're living alone," which Tucker considers a silly line. Writing in Billboard, Cary Darling praised the song's lyrics but criticises the easy listening arrangement which "fails to grab the listener". Ronald Hawkins described it as a "superbly crafted [song]". "Water of Love" has received support from classic rock radio stations as being among the greatest classic rock songs of all time; for example in 1991 C95 ranked it as #224 all time. The Rolling Stone Album Guide commented on the "stark, romantic vision" of this song and its B-side, "Down to the Waterline," and how that vision contrasted with the bitterness of Dire Straits songs such as "Sultans of Swing".

Several critics have commented that the song's style is reminiscent of J. J. Cale's blues approach. Others have noted country music influences.

== Covers ==
"Water of Love" is one of five songs that Knopfler's publisher made country demos of without Knopfler's approval, leading to a number of country covers of Knopfler's songs. This led to a cover version recorded by The Judds, which appeared on their River of Time album and was a single in the UK where it hit number 174 and in Germany. Wynonna Judd provided a "nocturnal and mysterious" lead vocal, and Knopfler himself played guitar on the Judds' version. Los Angeles Times critic Kristine McKenna described it as a "haunting ballad" and praised Knopfler's "languid and lovely touch" on guitar. Allmusic critic Thom Jurek described the song as "the most seductive tune" on River of Time and The Rolling Stone Album Guide praised Knopfler's "typically pungent" guitar solo. Alex Bollard and Lex Vandyke have also covered the song.

== In popular culture ==
In his book My Life in Orange, author Tim Guest recalls listening to Dire Straits' version of the song and the line "Water of love, deep in the ground, but there ain't no water here to be found" as a child hiding behind the sofa and wishing that the water of love would come to him some day. The first person narrator of Caprice Crane's first novel Stupid and Contagious references "Water of Love" as an example of a clever song that she would like to hear quoted instead of the sound of flushing toilets, along with AC/DC's "Big Balls," ZZ Top's "Tush," Nirvana's "Smells Like Teen Spirit" or Frank Sinatra's "My Way".

== Personnel ==
- Mark Knopfler – vocals, lead and rhythm guitars
- David Knopfler – rhythm guitar
- John Illsley – bass
- Pick Withers – drums

== Charts ==
| Chart (1978–79) | Peak position |
|---|---|
| Australia (Kent Music Report) | 54 |
| Netherlands (Single Top 100) | 28 |

== Certifications ==
Certifications for "Water of Love"
| Region | Certification | Certified units/sales |
|---|---|---|
| New Zealand (RMNZ) | Gold | 15,000^{‡} |
^{‡} Sales+streaming figures based on certification alone.
