= Live at the BBC (Dire Straits album) =

Live album by Dire Straits
- Released: 26 June 1995
- Recorded: 22 July 1978, 31 January 1981
- Studios: BBC Studios, London
- Genre: Roots rock
- Length: 46:01
- Labels: Windsong (UK); Vertigo (International); Warner Bros. (US)
- Producer: Various

Dire Straits chronology
Encores (1993)	Live at the BBC (1995)	Sultans of Swing (1998)

Live at the BBC is a live album by British rock band Dire Straits, released on 26 June 1995 on Vertigo Records internationally, and by Warner Bros. Records in the United States. The album was recorded on 22 July 1978 at BBC Studios in London, with one track recorded on 19 December 1980. The studio versions of the first six songs were released on Dire Straits. Live at the BBC was the band's third live album, preceded by Alchemy: Dire Straits Live (1984) and On the Night (1993).

In November 2023, Live at the BBC was included in the box set anthology, Live 1978-1992.

== Release ==
Live at the BBC was released on 26 June 1995, after the group officially disbanded. According to Mark Knopfler, the album was released because Dire Straits still owed one album to Phonogram Records (now Mercury Records). The album was a means to end the contract before Knopfler began his solo career (still signed to Mercury).

== Composition ==
Live at the BBC consists of eight songs, the first seven recorded for the BBC Live in Concert series on 22 July 1978. The eighth song, "Tunnel of Love", was recorded at the Rockpop concert in Dortmund on 19 December 1980.

== Critical reception ==
Professional ratings
Review scores
Source	Rating
AllMusic	3.5/5 stars

In his review for AllMusic, William Ruhlmann gave the album three and a half out of five stars, writing, "It's a modest effort from a modest band and, in that sense, a better representation of them than Alchemy or On the Night, both of which reflected their worldwide popularity." The album stayed on the UK albums chart for one week.

== Track listing ==
All songs were written by Mark Knopfler, except where indicated.

No.	Title	Writer(s)	Length
1.	"Down to the Waterline"		4:10
2.	"Six Blade Knife"		3:47
3.	"Water of Love"		5:29
4.	"Wild West End"		5:12
5.	"Sultans of Swing"		6:38
6.	"Lions"		5:26
7.	"What's the Matter Baby?"	David Knopfler, Mark Knopfler	3:20
8.	"Tunnel of Love"	Extract from "The Carousel Waltz" by Richard Rodgers and Oscar Hammerstein II	11:56
Total length:			46:01

== Personnel ==
Dire Straits

- Mark Knopfler – guitar, vocals
- David Knopfler – guitar, backing vocals (except on track 8)
- John Illsley – bass, backing vocals
- Pick Withers – drums
- Alan Clark – keyboards (only on track 8)
- Hal Lindes – guitar (only on track 8)

== Charts ==
Chart (1995)	Peak position
Dutch Albums (Album Top 100)	15
Swiss Albums (Schweizer Hitparade)	45
UK Albums (Official Charts)	71

== Certifications and sales ==
Region	Certification	Certified units/sales
Spain (Promusicae)	Gold	50,000^{^}
^{^} Shipments figures based on certification alone.
