= Tunnel of Love (Dire Straits song) =

Single by Dire Straits

from the album Making Movies
- B-side: "Tunnel of Love, Part 2"
- Released: 24 October 1980 (EU); 2 October 1981 (UK)
- Recorded: 20 June – 25 August 1980
- Genre: Heartland rock; art rock
- Length: 8:09 (album version); 5:01 (single version, part 1); 3:16 (single version, part 2)
- Label: Vertigo; Warner Bros.
- Songwriters: Mark Knopfler; Richard Rodgers; Oscar Hammerstein II (intro)
- Producers: Jimmy Iovine; Mark Knopfler

Dire Straits singles chronology
"Lady Writer" (1979)	"Tunnel of Love" (1980)	"Skateaway" (1980)

"Tunnel of Love" is a song by the British rock band Dire Straits. It appears on the 1980 album Making Movies, and subsequently on the live albums Alchemy and Live at the BBC and the greatest hits albums Money for Nothing, Sultans of Swing: The Very Best of Dire Straits, and The Best of Dire Straits & Mark Knopfler: Private Investigations. The song was also featured in the 1982 Richard Gere film An Officer and a Gentleman and was included on the film’s accompanying soundtrack album.

The song mentions the Spanish City, a dining and entertainment centre in Whitley Bay, England, which, at the time of the song’s release, housed fair rides and other amusements, referenced throughout the song.

"Tunnel of Love" is one of only three Dire Straits songs in which songwriting is not credited solely to frontman and lead guitarist Mark Knopfler, as the opening instrumental is an arrangement of the "Carousel Waltz" from the Rodgers and Hammerstein musical Carousel.

== Reception ==
Ultimate Classic Rock critic Michael Gallucci rated "Tunnel of Love" as Dire Straits' 4th best song and said it contains Mark Knopfler's best guitar solo. Classic Rock critic Paul Rees rated it to be Dire Straits' 2nd best song, saying that it combines "Dylan's and Springsteen's biggest moments with Geordie grit."

== Chart performance ==
"Tunnel of Love" reached the position of number 54 in the UK Singles Chart upon its single release in October 1981, a rather modest position despite being one of the band's most famous and popular compositions. However, it fared much better in other countries, especially Italy (#7) and Spain (#11).

== Personnel ==
Dire Straits

- Mark Knopfler – vocals, guitar
- John Illsley – bass, vocals
- Pick Withers – drums, vocals

Additional musicians

- Roy Bittan – piano, Hammond organ
- Sid McGinnis – guitar (uncredited)

== Music videos ==
Two music videos exist for the song, one directed by Lester Bookbinder, depicting Mark Knopfler, John Illsley and Pick Withers performing on a blank set, intercut with imagery and actors, most notably the "heroine" played by a young Leslie Ash relevant to the lyrics, the other featuring a larger band arrangement and telling the story of a couple escaping a group of soldiers who chase them from a funfair.

== Live performances ==
In 1980s concerts, Dire Straits played the central theme of The Animals' "Don't Let Me Be Misunderstood" during an extended instrumental introduction to the song, as Knopfler talked about that group's hometown of Newcastle. Knopfler's outro solo has received numerous plaudits over the years:

"Throughout 'Tunnel of Love,' Mark Knopfler dramatizes this close encounter by using his guitar as a Greek chorus. [...] Later, as Knopfler walks alone through the 'carousel and the carnival arcades,' waiting for another night and another girl, he wraps his voice like a ratty old raincoat around Bittan's gently tinkling piano and the long guitar solo that ends the track. Somehow, the evocative moan of the artist's guitar suggests a truth much deeper than the carnival-as-life metaphor has revealed."

Knopfler also sometimes played melody from chorus of "Stop! In the Name of Love" by The Supremes, as an additional intro prior to the "Carousel Waltz" while performing this song live.

== Certifications ==
Region	Certification	Certified units/sales
Italy (FIMI)	Gold	35,000^{‡}
New Zealand (RMNZ)	Platinum	30,000^{‡}
United Kingdom (BPI)	Silver	200,000^{‡}
^{‡} Sales+streaming figures based on certification alone.
