= Beautiful You =

Beautiful You may refer to:

- "Beautiful You", a 1972 song by Neil Sedaka
- "Beautiful You" (The Oak Ridge Boys song), a 1981 song The Oak Ridge Boys
- "Beautiful You" / "Sennen Koi Uta", a song by Tohoshinki
- "Beautiful You", a song by Carly Smithson
- Beautiful You (album), a 2008 album by John Illsley
- Beautiful You (novel), a 2014 novel by Chuck Palahniuk
