= Release (David Knopfler album) =

Studio album by David Knopfler
- Released: October 1983
- Recorded: May–June 1983
- Studio: Birdland Studios, Buckinghamshire; The Workhouse, Old Kent Road; Matrix, London
- Genre: Rock
- Label: Peach River Records
- Producer: Tony Spath, David Knopfler

David Knopfler chronology
Release (1983)	Behind the Lines (1985)

Singles from Release
- 1. "Soul Kissing/Come to Me" Released: September 1983

Professional ratings
Review scores
Source	Rating
Allmusic	3/5 stars

Release is David Knopfler's first solo album after leaving Dire Straits. It was released in 1983 on the Peach River and Passport labels, and in 1997 on the Paris label.

== Track listing ==
All tracks composed by David Knopfler; except where indicated

1. "Soul Kissing"
2. "Come to Me" (David Knopfler, Harry Bogdanovs)
3. "Madonna's Daughter"
4. "The Girl and the Paperboy"
5. "Roman Times" (David Knopfler, Harry Bogdanovs)
6. "Sideshow"
7. "Little Brother"
8. "Hey Henry"
9. "Night Train" (David Knopfler, Harry Bogdanovs)
10. "The Great Divide"

== Personnel ==
- David Knopfler – guitar, vocals, piano, synthesizer
- Bub Roberts – guitar
- Mark Knopfler – rhythm guitar (3)
- Betsy Cook – piano, synthesizer, backing vocals
- Danny Schogger – piano (10)
- Harry Bogdanovs – synthesizer
- Kevin Powell – bass (except 1 & 8)
- John Illsley – bass (1)
- Pino Palladino – bass (8)
- Arran Ahmun – drums, percussion
- DMX - drums
- Germaine Johnson, Marie Broady – backing vocals
- Mike Pace – saxophone
- Roger Downham – vibraphone
- Bobby Valentino – violin (8)
