= Skateaway =

Single by Dire Straits

from the album Making Movies
- B-side: "Solid Rock"
- Released: December 1980 (US): March 1981 (UK)
- Recorded: 20 June – 25 August 1980
- Genre: Rock; heartland rock
- Length: 6:40 (album version); 4:43 (single version)
- Label: Vertigo
- Songwriter(s): Mark Knopfler
- Producer(s): Mark Knopfler; Jimmy Iovine

Dire Straits singles chronology
"Tunnel of Love" (1980)	"Skateaway" (1980)	"Romeo and Juliet" (1981)

Music video
- "Skateaway" on YouTube

"Skateaway" is a 1980 rock song by Dire Straits, dealing with a female roller-skater breezing through busy city streets, while listening to a portable radio through her headphones. It appears on the band's 1980 album Making Movies. It was released as a single in 1980, and in January 1981 peaked at number 58 on the Billboard Hot 100 and number 37 on the UK Singles Chart. The song was accompanied by a video that was popular on MTV, featuring musician Jayzik Azikiwe (1958–2008) as Rollergirl. The daughter of Nigeria's first president Nnamdi Azikiwe, she was credited as Jay Carly in the video directed by Lester Bookbinder.

== Reception ==
Record World said that the narrative is "as vivid as [Knopfler's] guitar is distinctive". Ultimate Classic Rock critic Michael Gallucci rated "Skateaway" as Dire Straits' seventh best song, saying that it "sticks closer to a traditional rock-radio format" than the other songs on Making Movies.

Pitchfork said, "This track sees them transitioning out of their humble pub-rock roots and drifting toward their MTV future, swaddling Knopfler’s signature twang in a wool-sweater-warm synth hum and skeletal disco groove."

== Charts ==
Chart (1981)	Peak position
New Zealand (Recorded Music NZ)	47
UK Singles (OCC)	37
US Billboard Hot 100	58
