= Making Movies =

Studio album by Dire Straits
- Released: 17 October 1980
- Recorded: 20 June – 25 August 1980
- Studios: Power Station, New York City
- Genre: Roots rock
- Length: 38:17
- Labels: Vertigo (UK); Warner Bros. (US); Mercury (Canada)
- Producers: Jimmy Iovine; Mark Knopfler

Dire Straits chronology
Communiqué (1979)	Making Movies (1980)	Love over Gold (1982)

Singles from Making Movies
- 1. "Tunnel of Love" Released: 24 October 1980 (EU); 2. "Skateaway" Released: December 1980 (US); 3. "Romeo and Juliet" Released: 9 January 1981

Making Movies is the third studio album by British rock band Dire Straits, released on 17 October 1980 by Vertigo Records internationally, Warner Bros. Records in the United States and Mercury Records in Canada. The album includes the single "Romeo and Juliet", which reached number 8 on the UK Singles Chart, as well as "Tunnel of Love", featured in the 1982 Richard Gere film An Officer and a Gentleman.

Making Movies reached number one on the album charts in Italy and Norway, number 19 in the United States and number 4 in the United Kingdom. Making Movies was later certified platinum in the United States and double-platinum in the United Kingdom by the Recording Industry Association of America (RIAA) and the British Phonographic Industry (BPI) respectively.

== Background ==
After Dire Straits' Communiqué Tour ended on 21 December 1979 in London, Mark Knopfler spent the first half of 1980 writing the songs for the band's next album. He contacted Jimmy Iovine after hearing Iovine's production on the song "Because the Night" by Patti Smith, a song written by Smith and Bruce Springsteen. Iovine had also worked on Springsteen's Born to Run and Darkness on the Edge of Town albums, and was instrumental in recruiting E-Street Band keyboardist Roy Bittan for the Making Movies sessions.

Making Movies was recorded at the Power Station in New York from 20 June to 25 August 1980. Jimmy Iovine and Mark Knopfler produced the album.

David Knopfler left Dire Straits in August 1980 during the recording of the album, following heated arguments with his brother and almost immediately after the recording of a BBC2 Arena documentary about the group featuring several individual interviews with the band members. His guitar tracks were almost complete for the album, but were re-recorded by Mark. David appears on video playing "Solid Rock" and "Les Boys" live in concert, but these performances preceded the recording. The album sessions continued with Sid McGinnis on rhythm guitar, although he was uncredited. Dire Straits expanded into a quintet when keyboard player Alan Clark and Californian guitarist Hal Lindes were recruited as full-time group members shortly after the album's release in October 1980.

Four songs were recorded during the sessions but not released on the album: "Making Movies", "Suicide Towers", "Twisting by the Pool" and "Sucker for Punishment". A re-recorded version of "Twisting by the Pool" (made by a substantially different group line-up) was released on the ExtendedancEPlay EP on 10 January 1983 and reached the UK Top 20 when released as a single. The title of the album is taken from the unreleased title song “Making Movies” which was reworked into “Expresso Love” with some lyrics surviving in "Skateaway".

== Release ==
Making Movies was released on 17 October 1980 on LP and cassette formats. In 1981, an identically named short film was released on VHS and Beta, as well as screened in some theatrical venues, consisting of three music videos directed by fashion/commercial photographer Lester Bookbinder, for "Romeo and Juliet", "Tunnel of Love" and "Skateaway". The original CD version was released in 1984.

The album was remastered and reissued on CD with the rest of the Dire Straits catalogue in 1996 internationally and on 19 September 2000 in the United States.

The album's primary single was "Romeo and Juliet" which reached number 8 in the UK singles chart in early 1981. The second single release was "Skateaway", and the third and final single from the album was the lengthy opening track, "Tunnel of Love", with its intro "The Carousel Waltz" by Richard Rodgers and Oscar Hammerstein II, which only reached the number 54 position in the UK.

With new group members Clark and Lindes on board, Dire Straits embarked on tours of Europe, North America, and Oceania from October 1980 until July 1981 to promote the album.

Three of the seven tracks from Making Movies continued to be played throughout the Love over Gold, Brothers in Arms and On Every Street tours: "Romeo and Juliet", "Tunnel of Love", and "Solid Rock", while "Expresso Love" was played in all concert tours until 1986.

== Critical reception ==
Professional ratings
Review scores
Source	Rating
AllMusic	4.5/5 stars
Christgau's Record Guide	C+
Encyclopedia of Popular Music	4/5 stars
The Great Rock Discography	6/10
MusicHound	5/5
Pitchfork	8.9/10
Record Mirror	4/5 stars
Rolling Stone	4/5 stars
The Rolling Stone Album Guide	3/5 stars
Smash Hits	3/10

In his review for Rolling Stone, David Fricke wrote, "Making Movies is the record on which Mark Knopfler comes out from behind his influences and Dire Straits come out from behind Mark Knopfler. The combination of the star's lyrical script, his intense vocal performances and the band's cutting-edge rock & roll soundtrack is breathtaking—everything the first two albums should have been but weren't. If Making Movies really were a film, it might win a flock of Academy Awards."

In his retrospective review for AllMusic, Stephen Thomas Erlewine said that Making Movies saw Dire Straits chief songwriter Mark Knopfler increasing his ambitions by moving on from roots rock to country rock and folk rock, and that his songwriting skills were keeping pace. He was also complimentary towards the album's production and jazz leanings, though he opined that it runs out of steam towards the end.

Rolling Stone ranked Making Movies number 52 in their survey of the 100 Best Albums of the Eighties.

== Track listing ==
All songs were written by Mark Knopfler, except where indicated.

Side one
No.	Title	Length
1.	"Tunnel of Love" (Extract from "The Carousel Waltz" by Richard Rodgers and Oscar Hammerstein II)	8:11
2.	"Romeo and Juliet"	6:00
3.	"Skateaway"	6:40

Side two
No.	Title	Length
1.	"Expresso Love"	5:12
2.	"Hand in Hand"	4:48
3.	"Solid Rock"	3:19
4.	"Les Boys"	4:07
Total length:		38:17

== Personnel ==
Dire Straits

- Mark Knopfler – vocals, guitars
- John Illsley – bass, vocals
- Pick Withers – drums, vocals

Additional musicians

- Roy Bittan – keyboards
- Sid McGinnis – guitars (uncredited)

Production

- Jimmy Iovine – producer
- Mark Knopfler – producer
- Shelly Yakus – engineer
- Jeff Hendrickson – assistant engineer
- Jon Mathias – assistant engineer
- Greg Calbi – mastering at Sterling Sound (New York City, New York)
- Bob Ludwig – remastering
- Neil Terk – original design and artwork
- John Illsley – artwork
- Brian Griffin – photography

== Charts ==
=== Weekly charts ===
Chart (1980–2009)	Peak position
Australian Albums (Kent Music Report)	6
Austrian Albums (Ö3 Austria)	15
Canada Top Albums/CDs (RPM)	21
Dutch Albums (Album Top 100)	6
German Albums (Offizielle Top 100)	7
Italian Albums (FIMI)	1
New Zealand Albums (RMNZ)	3
Norwegian Albums (VG-lista)	1
Spanish Albums (AFE)	6
Swedish Albums (Sverigetopplistan)	4
UK Albums (Official Charts)	4
US Billboard 200	19

=== Year-end charts ===
Chart (1981)	Position
New Zealand Albums (RMNZ)	1
Chart (1982)	Position
New Zealand Albums (RMNZ)	8
Chart (1983)	Position
New Zealand Albums (RMNZ)	36
Chart (1986)	Position
New Zealand Albums (RMNZ)	50

== Certifications and sales ==
Region	Certification	Certified units/sales
Australia	—	125,000
Brazil	—	65,000
Canada (Music Canada)	2× Platinum	200,000^{^}
Denmark (IFPI Danmark)	Gold	10,000^{‡}
Finland (Musiikkituottajat)	Platinum	53,858
France (SNEP)	Gold	100,000^{*}
Germany (BVMI)	Gold	250,000^{^}
Italy (FIMI) 1980-1982 sales	Gold	250,000
Italy (FIMI) sales since 2009	Platinum	50,000^{‡}
Netherlands (NVPI)	Gold	178,231
New Zealand (RMNZ)	Platinum	15,000^{^}
Spain (Promusicae)	Gold	50,000^{^}
Switzerland (IFPI Switzerland)	Gold	25,000^{^}
United Kingdom (BPI)	2× Platinum	600,000^{^}
United States (RIAA)	Platinum	1,000,000^{^}
^{*} Sales figures based on certification alone.^{^} Shipments figures based on certification alone.^{‡} Sales+streaming figures based on certification alone.
