= Romeo and Juliet (Dire Straits song) =

1980 song by Dire Straits

- 1981 UK single

Single by Dire Straits

from the album Making Movies
- B-side: "Solid Rock"
- Released: 9 January 1981
- Recorded: 20 June – 25 August 1980
- Studio: Power Station (New York, NY)
- Genre: Rock
- Length: 6:01
- Label: Vertigo
- Songwriter: Mark Knopfler (co-written by Rick Cates)
- Producers: Mark Knopfler; Jimmy Iovine

Dire Straits singles chronology
"Skateaway" (1980)	"Romeo and Juliet" (1981)	"Private Investigations" (1982)

Music video
- "Romeo and Juliet" on YouTube

"Romeo and Juliet" is a rock song by the British rock band Dire Straits, written by frontman Mark Knopfler. It first appeared on the 1980 album Making Movies and was released as a single in 1981. The song subsequently appeared on the Dire Straits live albums Alchemy and On the Night, and later on Knopfler's live duet album with Emmylou Harris, Real Live Roadrunning (though Harris does not perform on the track). The track was also featured on the greatest hits albums Money for Nothing, Sultans of Swing: The Very Best of Dire Straits, and The Best of Dire Straits & Mark Knopfler: Private Investigations.

== Composition and lyrical interpretation ==
The lyrics of the song describe the experience of the two lovers of the title, hinting at a situation that saw the "Juliet" figure abandon her "Romeo" after finding fame and moving on from the rough neighbourhood where they first encountered each other. Knopfler wrote the song after his breakup with Holly Beth Vincent. In addition to the reference to William Shakespeare's play of the same title, the song makes playful allusion to other works involving young love, including the songs "Somewhere" – from West Side Story, which is itself based on the Shakespeare play – and "My Boyfriend's Back".

The song opens on an arpeggiated resonator guitar part played by Knopfler, who also sings the lead vocal. The introductory arpeggios and melody are played on a National Style "O" guitar; the same guitar featured on the album artwork for Brothers in Arms and Sultans of Swing: The Very Best of Dire Straits. In the Sky Arts documentary Guitar Stories: Mark Knopfler, "Knopfler picks up the National and demonstrates how he hit on the famous arpeggio lines in "Romeo and Juliet", from the Making Movies album, while experimenting with an open G tuning." The instrumentation remains simple during the verses and moves to a full-on rock arrangement in the chorus sections. The piano lick by Roy Bittan is borrowed from his own part on the song "Jungleland", from the 1975 Bruce Springsteen album Born to Run.

The music video was directed by Lester Bookbinder, who also directed the video for "Skateaway".

== Reception ==
Record World called it a "compelling performance that's both beautiful and forceful", praising Knopfler's guitar playing and the "Dylanesque" vocals. Ultimate Classic Rock critic Michael Gallucci rated "Romeo and Juliet" as Dire Straits' 3rd best song, saying that it "bridges Shakespeare, West Side Story and a modern rock 'n' roll love story where fame, not family, is keeping the young lovers apart." Classic Rock critic Paul Rees rated it to be Dire Straits' 4th greatest song, saying that most of it is "spine-tingling" and praising the "heart-tugging" refrain.

== Personnel ==
- Mark Knopfler – vocals, resonator guitar, electric guitar, acoustic guitar
- John Illsley – bass guitar
- Pick Withers – drums, percussion

Additional personnel

- Roy Bittan – piano, Hammond organ

== Charts ==
Chart (1981)	Peak position
Irish Singles Chart	5
UK Singles (Official Charts)	8

== Certifications ==
Region	Certification	Certified units/sales
Denmark (IFPI Danmark)	Gold	45,000^{‡}
Italy (FIMI)	Platinum	50,000^{‡}
New Zealand (RMNZ)	4× Platinum	120,000^{‡}
Spain (Promusicae)	Platinum	60,000^{‡}
United Kingdom (BPI)	Platinum	600,000^{‡}
^{‡} Sales+streaming figures based on certification alone.

== Covers ==
- The Killers in 2007: it was recorded live at Abbey Road Studios for the Channel 4 show Live from Abbey Road, featured as a B-side on "For Reasons Unknown" and reappeared on their compilation album Sawdust. "It's a great song," said drummer Ronnie Vannucci Jr. "Brandon (Flowers) was really into it. The original idea was to do the song with Johnny Borrell but he got really sick and couldn't do it. I think we pulled it off pretty good." Added Flowers: "It's one of the finest songs ever. Brilliant melodies."
- British folk singer-songwriter Steve Knightley: on his 2007 album Cruel River.
- Indigo Girls on their 1992 album Rites of Passage.
- American indie rock duo Widowspeak on their 2021 EP Honeychurch
