= Jack Sonni =

American musician (1954–2023)

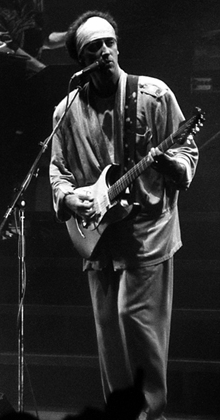
- Sonni in 1985

Background information
- Born: John Thomas Sonni; December 9, 1954; Indiana, Pennsylvania, U.S.
- Died: August 30, 2023 (aged 68) Taylor, Mississippi, U.S.
- Genres: Rock
- Occupation: Musician
- Instruments: Guitar; vocals
- Years active: 1976−1988
- Formerly of: Dire Straits
- Website: web.archive.org/web/20230901105310/https://www.jacksonni.com/

John Thomas Sonni (December 9, 1954 – August 30, 2023) was an American writer, musician, and marketing executive, best known as "the other guitarist" in Dire Straits during the band's Brothers in Arms era.

== Early life and education ==
John Thomas Sonni was born on December 9, 1954, in Indiana, Pennsylvania. He was drawn to music at an early age, first learning piano, then trumpet, before taking up guitar at 14. His love of the instrument led him to leave the University of Connecticut, where he was studying literature, to attend the Hartford Conservatory of Music.

== Career ==
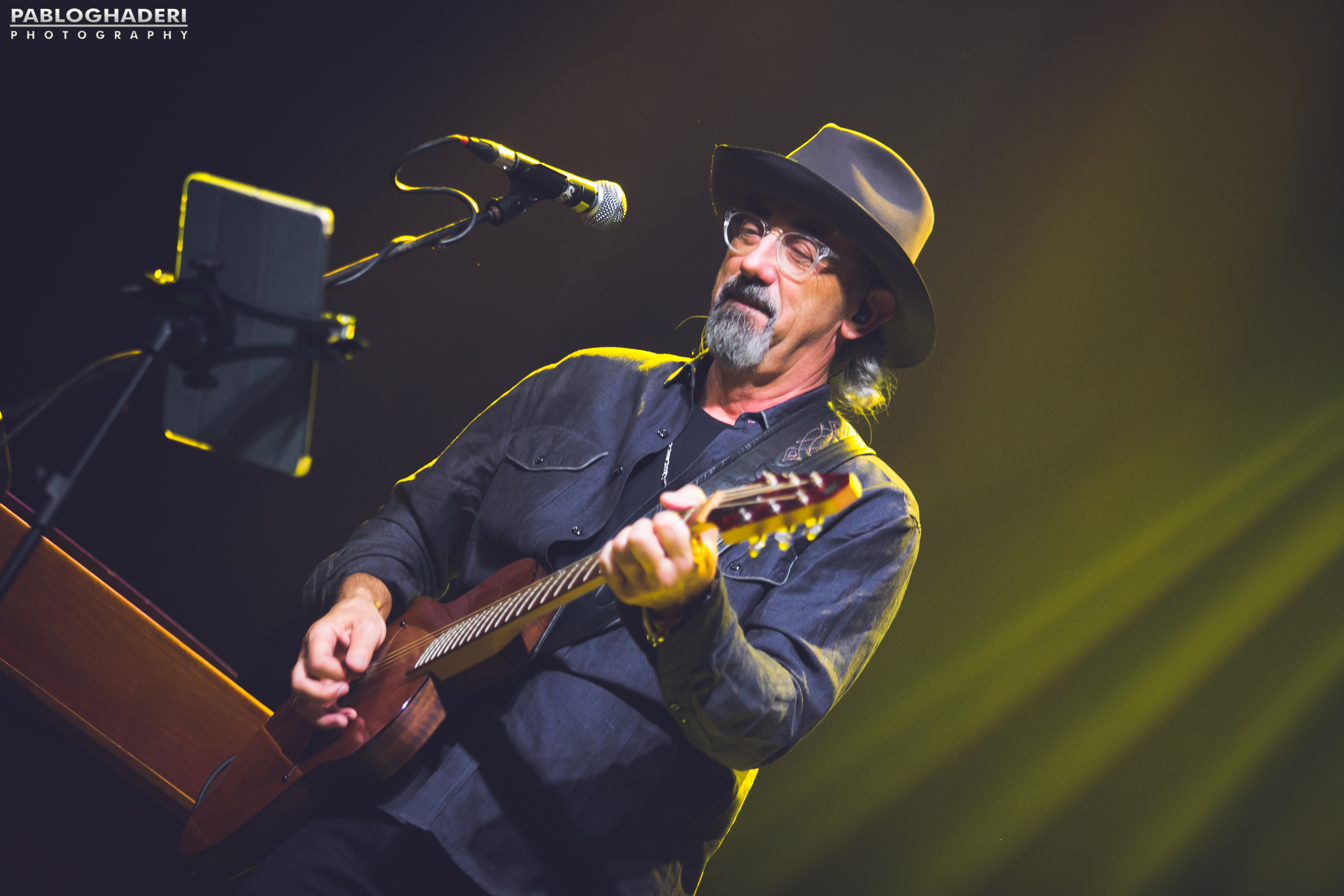
Jack Sonni on stage with Dire Straits Legacy

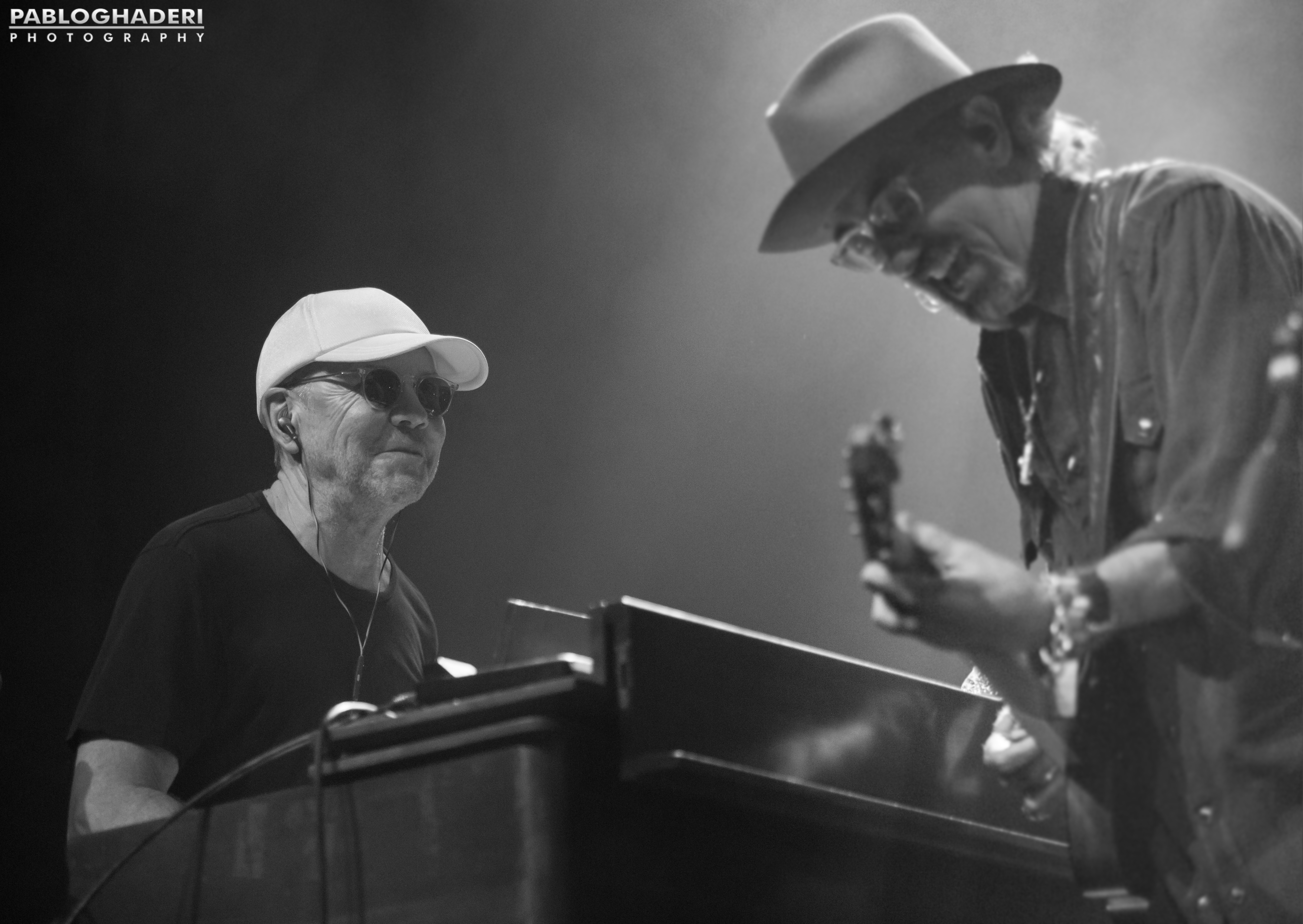
Alan Clark with Jack Sonni on stage with Dire Straits Legacy

After graduating, Sonni was introduced to New York session guitarist Elliott Randall, who had played the solo on Steely Dan's single "Reelin' In the Years". Randall became a mentor and teacher and convinced Sonni to move to New York City and begin his career. He lived in New York from 1976 through 1985, initially trying to break into session work, but began focusing on his own band. In the late 1970s, Sonni's band The Leisure Class became a Monday night fixture at Kenny's Castaways on Bleecker Street in Greenwich Village, a venue for up-and-coming acts.

In late 1977, Sonni went to work at Alex Music on 48th Street in Manhattan. In 1978, he started working at the newly opened Rudy's Music Stop, owned by luthier Rudy Pensa, where he met members of Dire Straits, first David and then Mark Knopfler.

Sonni visited the Knopflers in London, and after David (and then Hal Lindes) left the band, Sonni was asked to join the band for the 1984 recording sessions for Brothers in Arms, and as rhythm guitarist and backing vocals for the subsequent Brothers In Arms world tour of 1985–1986. Sonni accepted, and played guitar synthesizer on "The Man's Too Strong" on the album. He also played the Live Aid concert at Wembley, on July 13, 1985, with Dire Straits. Sonni also appears in several of the Brothers In Arms official videos. After his collaboration with Dire Straits, Sonni contributed to other musicians' works, but ended his professional musical career for some years (returning to it later) when his twin daughters were born in 1988.

Sonni started a second career as a marketing executive, first at Seymour Duncan, then Rivera Guitar Amplifiers followed by several years as director of marketing communications at Line 6, a manufacturer of digital technology products for musicians. He was instrumental in the development and launch of POD, which he named and designed the shape of. In 2001, he became vice president of marketing communication for Guitar Center.

In mid-2006, Sonni left Guitar Center to write literature, and moved to San José del Cabo, in Baja, Mexico, in 2007, then to Healdsburg, California, until January 2012, when he relocated to Brooklyn, New York, for a short time. At the time of his death, Sonni was living in Taylor, Mississippi, where he was very involved in the post pandemic music scene, and to which he had relocated after living for a time in Ventura, California.

Sonni was writer-in-residence and house manager at the Noepe Center for Literary Arts on Martha's Vineyard until its closing in 2017. He had also returned to playing music on a regular basis with his band, The Leisure Class. He also appeared and toured regularly with other former members of Dire Straits in the band, Dire Straits Legacy, prior to his death in August 2023.

Sonni hosted a podcast, "The Leisure Class with Jack Sonni".

== Death ==
Sonni died on August 30, 2023, at age 68.

== Discography ==
- Brothers in Arms (1985)
- San Antonio Live in 85 (2025)
