= Behind the Lines (David Knopfler album) =

Studio album by David Knopfler
- Released: 1985
- Recorded: Hermes Studio One, Kamen, West Germany
- Genre: Rock, pop
- Label: Paris Original Music
- Producer: David Knopfler, Hans Rolf Schade

David Knopfler chronology
Release (1983)	Behind the Lines (1985)	Cut the Wire (1986)

Behind the Lines is David Knopfler's second solo album after leaving Dire Straits. It was released in 1985 and in 1997 on the Paris Original Music label. The album was dedicated to "Anna with love".

== Track listing ==
All tracks composed by David Knopfler; except where indicated

1. "Heart to Heart" - 2:59
2. "Shockwave" (lyrics: David Knopfler; music: Bub Roberts, Hans Rolf Schade, David Knopfler) - 3:36
3. "Double Dealing" - 3:09
4. "The Missing Book" - 4:48
5. "I'll Be There" - 4:30
6. "Prophecies" - 5:48
7. "The Stone Wall Garden" - 4:11
8. "Sanchez" - 4:52
9. "One Time" - 3:16

== Personnel ==
- David Knopfler - piano, synthesizer, vocals
- Bub Roberts - guitar, guitar synthesizer
- Dave Taif Ball, Pino Palladino, Nick Davis - bass
- Richard Dunn, Hans Rolf Schade - piano, synthesizer
- Peter Schön - synthesizer, bass synthesizer on "Heart to Heart"
- Arrun Ahmun - drums, percussion
- Dave Jackson, Forrest Thomas, Judy Cheeks, Mick Jackson, Patricia Shockley - backing vocals
- Georg Mayr - saxophone on ""I'll Be There"
