= The Booze Brothers =

Studio album by Brewers Droop
- Released: 1989
- Recorded: 1973
- Studio: Rockfield Studios
- Genres: Blues rock, pub rock
- Label: Red Lightnin'
- Producers: Dave Edmunds, Kingsley Ward and Alimony Slim

The Booze Brothers, featuring Mark Knopfler & Dave Edmunds, is the second album released by Brewers Droop, an English blues band. Although most of the tracks were recorded in 1973 the album was only released in 1989 when it was discovered that the album had involved Dave Edmunds and the line-up had included Pick Withers and Mark Knopfler, later of Dire Straits. Ron Watts, the founder of the band, later in the '70s became a punk rock promoter at venues such as 100 Club. Steve Darrington continued as a professional musician, appearing on over 50 albums, and is the organizer of the Swanage Blues Festival.

== Track listing ==
1. "Where Are You Tonight" (John MacKay, Steve Darrington)
2. "Roller Coaster" (John MacKay, John Watts, Steve Darrington)
3. "You Make Me Feel So Good" (John MacKay, John Watts, Steve Darrington)
4. "My Old Lady" (Nick Gravenites)
5. "Sugar Baby" (Francis Romuald Lewis, Jerry McCain, Jerry Paul Tanner)
6. "Rock Steady Woman" (John MacKay, John Watts, Steve Darrington)
7. "Louise" (John MacKay, John Watts, Steve Darrington)
8. "What's The Time" (John MacKay, Steve Darrington)
9. "Midnight Special" (Al Smith)
10. "Dreaming" (John MacKay)

== Musicians ==
Alimony Slim - lead and/or background vocals (except on tracks 4 and 8), guitar (except on track 1)
"Big Ron" Watts - co-lead vocals (on tracks 2, 7), lead vocals (on tracks 4, 8), background vocals (on tracks 5, 6, 9)
Steve Darrington - accordion, organ, saxophone, clarinet, piano, background vocals
Mark Knopfler - guitar (on tracks 1, 4, 6)
Derrick Timms - bass, backup vocals (on tracks 2, 3, 5, 7, 9, 10)
Steve Norchi - bass (on tracks 1, 4, 6, 8)
Bobby O'Walker - drums (on all tracks except 3 and 8)
Pick Withers - drums, percussion (on tracks 3, 8)

Guests:

Track 3: Gerry Hogan - pedal steel
Track 10: Dave Edmunds - harp, banjo, double bass, Fender pedal steel, 'secret sound', all background vocals

== Artwork ==
The guitar showed in the album cover is the Mark Knopfler 1937 National Style O Resonator guitar, which is the same guitar showed on the Brothers in Arms.

== Recording ==
Recorded in and around Wales, circa 1973
1, 3, 6, Produced by Kingsley Ward and Alimony Slim
2, 9, 10, Produced by Dave Edmunds
4, 5, 8, Produced by Kingsley Ward
7, Produced by Dave Edmunds and Kingsley Ward

== Liner notes ==
The Droop began in the late sixties with Big Ron and various other players being dragged out of the pub in High Wycombe area and forced to play. In 1971 the situation became serious and they became one of the hardest gigging bands in the country and unable to spend much time in the pub.

An album was released which reflected the live stage act and enjoyed some commercial success, but circa 1973 times changed and new men arrived in the band.

At an audition in the Nags Head, High Wycombe, Mark Knopfler auditioned with a red guitar, a flat hat, and joined the band.

Around this time the Droop were in the middle of recording tracks in an unknown location in the U.K. These tracks were done with Mark and a new bass player—Steve Norchi, with production help from Dave Edmunds. Some of these tracks are featured on this album.

Brewers Droop began as a Cajun band and progressed to what is recorded on the disc.
