= Never Told a Soul =

Studio album by John Illsley
- Released: 29 June 1984
- Genre: Rock
- Label: Vertigo
- Producer: John Illsley, Phill Brown

John Illsley chronology
Never Told a Soul (1984)	Glass (1988)

Never Told a Soul is the first solo album by John Illsley, a founding member of Dire Straits.

== Track listing ==
All tracks composed by John Illsley

1. "Boy with Chinese Eyes"
2. "The Night Café"
3. "Never Told a Soul"
4. "Jimmy on the Central Line"
5. "Northern Land"
6. "Another Alibi"
7. "Let the River Flow"

== Personnel ==
- John Illsley – vocals, bass, acoustic guitar
- Mark Knopfler – guitars
- Phil Palmer – guitars
- Kevin Jarvis – piano, Fairlight CMI, Hammond Organ
- Terry Williams – drums
- Bobby Valentino – violin
- Jodie Linscott – percussion
- Martin Drover – trumpet, flugelhorn on "Northern Land"
- Chris White – tenor and alto saxophone

== Recording ==
- Recorded at Parkgate Studios, East Sussex
- Mixed at Air Studios, London
