= Anthology: 1983–2008 =

Compilation album by David Knopfler
- Released: Mar 10, 2009
- Genre: Roots rock, folk rock, soft rock

David Knopfler chronology
| Songs for the Siren (2006) | Anthology: 1983–2008 (2009) |

Anthology: 1983–2008 is a compilation album by David Knopfler. It was released on 10 March 2009. The compilation consists of 16 tracks from his 10 solo albums.

== Track listing ==
1. "Soul Kissing"
2. "Double Dealing"
3. "When We Kiss"
4. "What Then Must We Do"
5. "To Feel That Way Again"
6. "Lonely Is the Night"
7. "Rise Again"
8. "Southside Tenements"
9. "The Heart of It All"
10. "I Remember It All"
11. "Arcadie"
12. "St. Swithun's Day"
13. "Going Down with the Waves"
14. "Easy Street"
15. "Steel Wheels"
16. "Ship of Dreams"

== Personnel ==
- David Knopfler – vocals, guitar, mandolin, piano, vibraphone
- Chris Rea – slide guitar
- Alan Clark – piano, Hammond B-3 organ
- Tony Carey – piano, Hammond bB3 organ, bass guitar
- Geoff Dugmore – drums, percussion
- Rob Farrer – timpani
- Kuma Harada – bass instrument
- Harry Bogdanovs – guitar, electric guitar, banjo, mandolin, bass instrument
- Megan Slankard – vocals
- Peter Shaw – fretless bass
- Tom McFarland – percussion
- Hutch Hutchinson - fretless bass on "St Swithens Day"
