= Beautiful You (album) =

Studio album by Greg Pearle and John Illsley
- Released: October 2008
- Recorded: British Grove Studios
- Genre: Rock
- Label: Creek Records

John Illsley chronology
Live in Les Baux de Provence (2007)	Beautiful You (2008)

Beautiful You is an album by Irish singer-songwriter Greg Pearle and John Illsley, the former bass player for Dire Straits. Illsley had withdrawn from the music scene when he met Pearle, who was playing in a covers band at a pub party for a friend of Illsley's, and the two began playing together in an informal capacity.

== Track listing ==
All songs written by Greg Pearle.

1. Secret Garden
2. Shine
3. One
4. Demons
5. Loving You
6. Beautiful You
7. Love Let Me Breathe
8. Got No Plans
9. Crazy Kind of Love
10. I Believe
11. Precious

== Personnel ==
- Greg Pearle - lead vocals, acoustic guitar
- John Illsley - bass guitar, lead guitar, backing vocals
- Guy Fletcher - keyboards
- Jamie Lane - drums
- Chris White - brass, saxophone
- Paul Brady - whistle, backing vocals
- Danny Cummings - percussion
