= Lady Writer =

- UK release picture sleeve

Single by Dire Straits

from the album Communiqué
- B-side: "Where Do You Think You're Going?"
- Released: 20 July 1979
- Genre: Rock
- Length: 3:45
- Label: Vertigo
- Songwriter: Mark Knopfler
- Producers: Barry Beckett; Jerry Wexler

Dire Straits singles chronology
"Sultans of Swing" (1978)	"Lady Writer" (1979)	"Tunnel of Love" (1980)

Music video
- "Lady Writer" on YouTube

"Lady Writer" is a 1979 song by Dire Straits, which appears on the band's second album Communiqué. It was written by the band's lead singer, Mark Knopfler.

Because the song says the writer is "talking about the Virgin Mary", some have speculated that the writer in question is Marina Warner, a view shared by Warner herself.

== Reception ==
Billboard described the song as a "hypnotic rocker" with "sizzling instrumentation" and "distinctive vocals." Cash Box described it as being "very similar musically to 'Sultans of Swing', with guitarist/singer Knopfler's invigoratingly unique picking and vocal style." Record World said that "Knopfler's transcendent writing & guitar skills work well with the magic of Muscle Shoals." Smash Hits said, "This is SO like 'Sultans of Swing' it's not true. Look, the only way you'll want this is if you've got (a) more money than sense, and (b) a memory like a sieve." Hubert Bauch of the Montreal Gazette agreed it was "a fast and nimble piece that matches 'Sultans of Swing'."

== Charts ==
Chart (1979)	Peak position
Australia (Kent Music Report)	95
Canada Top Singles (RPM)	51
Netherlands (Dutch Top 40)	18
Netherlands (Single Top 100)	18
New Zealand (Recorded Music NZ)	39
Spain (AFE)	26
UK Singles (Official Charts)	51
US Billboard Hot 100	45
US Cash Box	63

== Certifications ==
Certifications for "Lady Writer"
Region	Certification	Certified units/sales
New Zealand (RMNZ)	Platinum	30,000^{‡}
United Kingdom (BPI) Sales since 2004	Silver	200,000^{‡}
^{‡} Sales+streaming figures based on certification alone.
