= Communiqué (Dire Straits album) =

Studio album by Dire Straits
- Released: 5 June 1979
- Recorded: 28 November – 12 December 1978
- Studio: Compass Point (New Providence)
- Genre: Roots rock
- Length: 42:44
- Labels: Vertigo; Warner Bros.; Mercury
- Producers: Barry Beckett; Jerry Wexler

Dire Straits chronology
Dire Straits (1978)	Communiqué (1979)	Making Movies (1980)

Singles from Communiqué
- 1. "Lady Writer" Released: 20 July 1979; 2. "Once Upon a Time in the West" Released: October 1979 (US)

Communiqué is the second studio album by British rock band Dire Straits, released on 5 June 1979 by Vertigo Records internationally, Warner Bros. Records in the United States and Mercury Records in Canada. The album featured the single "Lady Writer", which reached number 45 on the Billboard Hot 100 chart and number 51 on the UK Singles Chart. The album reached number one on album charts in Germany, Spain, New Zealand, and Sweden, number 11 in the United States and number 5 in the United Kingdom. Communiqué was later certified gold in the United States, platinum in the United Kingdom and double-platinum in France.

It is the last Dire Straits album to feature David Knopfler, who left the band during the making of their following album, and the last with the original lineup.

== Recording ==
After the Dire Straits Tour finished in Hitchin on 18 November 1978, Dire Straits set to work on recording their second album. The recording sessions for Communiqué took place from 28 November to 12 December 1978 at Compass Point Studios on New Providence, The Bahamas. The album was mixed in January 1979 at Muscle Shoals Sound Studio in Alabama. The album was produced by Jerry Wexler and Barry Beckett, veteran producers from Muscle Shoals Sound Studio. Beckett (credited as B. Bear) also contributed keyboards to some of the album's nine tracks.

== Release ==
Communiqué was released on vinyl LP and cassette on 5 June 1979, eight months after the release of the band's self-titled debut. It entered the German charts at number one, while its predecessor was still at number three.

"Lady Writer" was the first single released from Communiqué. Communiqué was remastered and reissued with the rest of the Dire Straits catalogue in 1996 for most of the world outside the United States and on 19 September 2000 in the United States.

Dire Straits toured throughout 1979 after the recording sessions were completed. The Communiqué Tour started in February 1979 in Rotterdam, four months before the album's release in June. Dire Straits would play a total of 116 concerts in Europe and North America, the final concert taking place on 21 December 1979 in London.

Communiqué was the last album to feature David Knopfler, who left the band over creative differences with his brother during the recording of their third album in August 1980. It is the only Dire Straits album not represented on the compilation Private Investigations: The Best of Dire Straits & Mark Knopfler.

== Artwork ==
The album cover was designed by Hothouse, art directed by Alan Schmidt with the cover illustration by Geoff Halpin.

== Critical reception ==
Professional ratings
Review scores
Source	Rating
AllMusic	2.5/5 stars
Christgau's Record Guide	B−
MusicHound Rock: The Essential Album Guide	3/5 stars
Pitchfork	6.2/10
The Rolling Stone Album Guide	3/5 stars

In a 1979 review for the Birmingham Daily Post, Jonathan Daümler-Ford called it a "competent record", but wrote that "the songs sound like pale imitations, or the cuts which were not good enough for Dire Straits". Record World said of "Once Upon a Time in the West" that Knopfler's "unique and super-sensitive vocals evoke vivid imagery that's totally enhanced by the Wexler-Beckett production team." The Tucson Citizen called the album "an appealing production," writing that "a combination of country and reggae can be substantial."

In his retrospective review for AllMusic, William Ruhlmann wrote that the second album "seemed little more than a carbon copy of its predecessor with less compelling material."

== Track listing ==
All tracks are written by Mark Knopfler.

Side one
No.	Title	Length
1.	"Once Upon a Time in the West"	5:24
2.	"News"	4:11
3.	"Where Do You Think You're Going?"	3:50
4.	"Communiqué"	5:49

Side two
No.	Title	Length
1.	"Lady Writer"	3:43
2.	"Angel of Mercy"	4:32
3.	"Portobello Belle"	4:29
4.	"Single-Handed Sailor"	4:42
5.	"Follow Me Home"	5:51
Total length:		42:44

== Personnel ==
=== Dire Straits ===
- Mark Knopfler – vocals, lead and rhythm guitars
- David Knopfler – rhythm guitar, backing vocals
- John Illsley – bass guitar, backing vocals
- Pick Withers – drums

=== Additional musician ===
- Barry Beckett – keyboards

=== Production ===
- Jerry Wexler and Barry Beckett (credited as B. Bear) – producers
- Gregg Hamm – mix engineer
- Jack Nuber – engineer
- Bobby Hata – mastering
- Paul Wexler – mastering supervisor
- Bob Ludwig – remastering
- Thelbert Rigby – tape operator
- Alan Schmidt – art direction
- Geoff Halpin – illustrations

== Charts ==
Communiqué spent 32 weeks on the UK Albums Chart.

=== Weekly charts ===
Chart (1979–2009)	Peak position
Austrian Albums (Ö3 Austria)	7
Dutch Albums (Album Top 100)	3
German Albums (Offizielle Top 100)	1
Hungarian Albums (MAHASZ)	38
Italian Albums (FIMI)	97
New Zealand Albums (RMNZ)	1
Norwegian Albums (VG-lista)	2
Spanish Albums (AFE)	1
Swedish Albums (Sverigetopplistan)	1
UK Albums (Official Charts)	5
US Billboard 200	11

=== Year-end charts ===
Chart (1979)	Position
Austrian Albums (Ö3 Austria)	15
Dutch Albums (Album Top 100)	15
German Albums (Offizielle Top 100)	15
New Zealand Albums (RMNZ)	24

== Sales and certifications ==
Region	Certification	Certified units/sales
Austria (IFPI Austria)	Gold	25,000^{*}
Brazil	—	90,000
Canada (Music Canada)	2× Platinum	200,000^{^}
Denmark (IFPI Danmark)	Gold	10,000^{‡}
Finland (Musiikkituottajat)	Gold	25,000
France (SNEP)	2× Platinum	600,000^{*}
Germany (BVMI)	Platinum	500,000^{^}
Italy (FIMI) sales since 2009	Gold	25,000^{‡}
Netherlands (NVPI)	Platinum	217,080
New Zealand (RMNZ)	Gold	7,500^{^}
Spain (Promusicae)	Platinum	100,000^{^}
Sweden (GLF)	Gold	50,000^{^}
Switzerland (IFPI Switzerland)	3× Platinum	150,000^{^}
United Kingdom (BPI)	Platinum	300,000^{^}
United States (RIAA)	Gold	500,000^{^}
^{*} Sales figures based on certification alone.^{^} Shipments figures based on certification alone.^{‡} Sales+streaming figures based on certification alone.
