= Brewers Droop =

British pub rock band (1971–1973)

- The original Brewers Droop, taken in 1972

Background information
- Origin: High Wycombe, England
- Genres: Blues rock, pub rock
- Years active: 1971–1973
- Labels: RCA; Red Lightnin'
- Past members: Ron Watts; Steve Darrington; John McKay; Malcolm Barrett; Bob Walker; Derrick Timms; Steve Norchi; Pick Withers; Mark Knopfler

Brewers Droop was a Southern English pub rock band of the early 1970s. Though they did not chart, they are notable as an early exponent of the pub rock style, as well as for their connections with Dire Straits, as both Mark Knopfler and Pick Withers played with the group for a few months in 1973.

== History ==
The band was descended from Mahogany, a UK blues-based band that had released one self-titled album in the US for Epic Records in 1969. Mahogany's original material was composed by the team of singer/guitarist John Mackay and keyboard-player Steve Darrington; this duo helped assemble a new group in 1971 that continued playing blues-based music, and gigged extensively in the early days of the UK's pub rock scene. The band's name Brewer's Droop is a slang expression for erectile dysfunction brought on by heavy drinking.

Signed to the UK division of RCA in 1972, at the time of their first album (Opening Time) Brewers Droop consisted of Ron Watts (vocals, percussion), John "Alimony Slim" Mackay (guitars, vocals), Steve Darrington (keyboards, reeds), Malcolm Barrett (bass), and Bob Walker (drums). A non-LP single, "Sweet Thing", also appeared in 1972.

By the following year, Barrett had been replaced by Derrick Timms on bass. This line-up amended their name to The Droop and, with Dave Edmunds and Kingsley Ward producing, issued another non-LP single, ("Louise" b/w "Caught Us Doin' It"), in September 1973.

Throughout 1973, The Droop continued to record a proposed second album while undergoing various line-up changes. Pick Withers took over on drums for a short spell before Walker returned. Shortly thereafter, Timms left and was replaced by new bassist Steve Nachi. Around the same time, Mark Knopfler was recruited as the group's primary guitarist, allowing Mackay to come to the fore as a co-lead vocalist with Watts. Knopfler split his time between teaching part-time, and playing with the band. This line-up only lasted a few months before dissolving by the end of 1973.

Knopfler and Withers (who had not actually been in The Droop at the same time) went on to success in the band Dire Straits.

Watts became a concert promoter, while Darrington played in live bands and issued the solo album London Picker in 1981.

After Knopfler's later success with Dire Straits, the second Droop album was issued in 1989. It was given the title The Booze Brothers and was credited to "Brewers Droop featuring Mark Knopfler and Dave Edmunds", although Knopfler only played on three of the album's tracks, and Edmunds (as a guest musician) played on only one.

== Discography ==
=== Albums ===
- Opening Time (1972)
- The Booze Brothers (1989, recorded 1973)

=== Singles ===
- "Sweet Thing", 1972
- "Louise" (as The Droop), 1973
