= Dire Straits (album) =

Studio album by Dire Straits
- Released: 9 June 1978
- Recorded: February 1978
- Studios: Basing Street, Notting Hill, London
- Genres: Blues rock; pub rock
- Length: 41:34
- Labels: Vertigo; Warner Bros.; Mercury
- Producer: Muff Winwood

Dire Straits chronology
Dire Straits (1978)	Communiqué (1979)

Singles from Dire Straits
- 1. "Sultans of Swing" Released: May 1978; 2. "Water of Love" Released: October 1978 (NL)

Dire Straits is the debut studio album by the British rock band Dire Straits, released on 9 June 1978 by Vertigo Records internationally, Warner Bros. Records in the United States and Mercury Records in Canada. The album features the hit single "Sultans of Swing", which reached number 4 on the Billboard Hot 100 chart and number 8 on the UK Singles Chart. The album reached the top of the album charts in Germany, Australia and France, number 2 in the United States and number 5 in the United Kingdom. Dire Straits was later certified double platinum in both the United States and the United Kingdom by the Recording Industry Association of America (RIAA) and the British Phonographic Industry (BPI) respectively.

== Recording ==
Dire Straits was recorded at Basing Street Studios in London from 13 February to 5 March 1978. Mark Knopfler used a few guitars for the recording, including a pair of red Fender Stratocasters—one from 1961 (serial number 68354) and one from 1962 (serial number 80470). He played his 1938 National Style O 14 fret guitar (serial number B1844) (Note: Knopfler's 1938 National Style O 14 fret guitar — famously used for the Brothers in Arms cover artwork — is a 1937 model and was purchased in the early 1970s from Steve Phillips. Knopfler has used it on all Dire Straits albums and on all of his solo albums.) on "Water of Love" and "Wild West End". He also used a black Telecaster Thinline (serial number 226254) on "Setting Me Up". His brother David played a black Fender Stratocaster and a Harmony Sovereign acoustic guitar. The album was produced by Muff Winwood, and engineered by Rhett Davies, assisted by Greg Cobb.

== Release ==
The album was first released on 9 June 1978 in the UK and on 20 October in the US. The first single released was "Sultans of Swing" which first broke into the United States top five early in the spring of 1979, becoming a hit a full five months after the album was released there, and then reached number eight in the UK Singles Chart. "Water of Love" was also released as a single in some countries, and charted in Australia, reaching number 54, and in the Netherlands, reaching number 28.

"Sultans of Swing" was re-released as a single in the UK in October 1988 to promote the greatest hits compilation Money for Nothing, released at the same time.

The album was remastered and reissued with the rest of the Dire Straits catalogue in 1996 to most of the world excluding the US and on 19 September 2000 in the United States.

== Artwork ==
The album cover artwork is designed by Hothouse, who commissioned the cover painting from Chuck Loyola. The Dire Straits Fender logo, which appears on the back cover, was designed by Geoff Halpern.

== Touring ==
Dire Straits promoted the release of their first single and album with the Dire Straits Tour, which started on 6 June 1978 at the Lafayette Club in Wolverhampton, included 55 shows, ending on 18 November 1978 at the College of Education in Hitchin. The European tour included concerts in the United Kingdom, France, Belgium, Germany and the Netherlands. These concerts presented Dire Straits with their largest audiences to that date. The first leg of the tour promoted "Sultans of Swing" and took the band around Great Britain in June and July 1978. The band typically performed in small halls with a maximum capacity of 1,000. The second leg of the tour promoted the band's debut album. This leg took the band to several European countries, where they met journalists and performed on television programmes.

== Critical reception ==
Professional ratings
Review scores
Source	Rating
AllMusic	4/5 stars
Christgau's Record Guide	B
Encyclopedia of Popular Music	4/5 stars
The Great Rock Discography	8/10
MusicHound	4/5
Pitchfork	8.2/10
The Rolling Stone Album Guide	3.5/5 stars
Sputnikmusic	5/5

In a retrospective review for AllMusic, Stephen Thomas Erlewine called the album "remarkably accomplished for a debut". Erlewine praised Knopfler's "spare, tasteful guitar lines and his husky warbling" and his "inclination toward Dylanesque imagery, which enhances the smoky, low-key atmosphere of the album".

In his review for Rolling Stone, Ken Tucker wrote that the band "plays tight, spare mixtures of rock, folk and country music with a serene spirit and witty irony. It's almost as if they were aware that their forte has nothing to do with what's currently happening in the industry, but couldn't care less." Tucker singled out "Sultans of Swing" for its "inescapable hook" and "Bob Dylan-like snarl in its vocal". He also praised "Setting Me Up" as a "heavenly number, funny and bitter".

== Track listing ==
All tracks are written by Mark Knopfler.

Side one
No.	Title	Length
1.	"Down to the Waterline"	3:55
2.	"Water of Love"	5:23
3.	"Setting Me Up"	3:18
4.	"Six Blade Knife"	4:10
5.	"Southbound Again"	2:58

Side two
No.	Title	Length
1.	"Sultans of Swing"	5:47
2.	"In the Gallery"	6:16
3.	"Wild West End"	4:42
4.	"Lions"	5:05
Total length:		41:34

"Sultans of Swing" fades out early (5:36) on some CD pressings before 1996.

== Personnel ==
Personnel taken from Dire Straits liner notes.

=== Dire Straits ===
- Mark Knopfler – vocals, lead and rhythm guitars
- David Knopfler – rhythm guitar
- John Illsley – bass
- Pick Withers – drums

=== Production ===
- Rhett Davies – engineer
- Muff Winwood – producer
- Paddy Eckersley – photography
- Chuck Loyola – cover painting
- Alan Schmidt – art direction
- Bob Ludwig – remastering

== Charts ==
Dire Straits spent 132 weeks on the UK Albums Chart.

=== Weekly charts ===
Chart (1978–2010)	Peak position
Austrian Albums (Ö3 Austria)	17
Canada Top Albums/CDs (RPM)	2
Dutch Albums (Album Top 100)	3
French Albums (SNEP)	194
German Albums (Offizielle Top 100)	3
Italian Albums (FIMI)	66
New Zealand Albums (RMNZ)	2
Norwegian Albums (VG-lista)	10
Spanish Albums Chart	10
Swedish Albums (Sverigetopplistan)	6
UK Albums (Official Charts)	5
US Billboard 200	2

Chart (2025–2026)	Peak position
Belgian Albums (Ultratop Flanders)	71
Greek Albums (IFPI)	13
Norwegian Rock Albums (IFPI Norge)	11

=== Year-end charts ===
Chart (1978)	Position
Dutch Albums (Album Top 100)	10
Chart (1979)	Position
Canada Top Albums/CDs (RPM)	12
Dutch Albums (Album Top 100)	32
German Albums (Offizielle Top 100)	1
New Zealand Albums (RMNZ)	6
US Billboard 200	23
Chart (1981)	Position
New Zealand Albums (RMNZ)	44
Chart (2024)	Position
Dutch Albums (Album Top 100)	91
Chart (2025)	Position
Dutch Albums (Album Top 100)	61
Icelandic Albums (Tónlistinn)	87
Swedish Albums (Sverigetopplistan)	68

== Certifications and sales ==
Region	Certification	Certified units/sales
Australia	—	47,000
Austria (IFPI Austria)	Gold	25,000^{*}
Brazil (Pro-Música Brasil)	Gold	150,000
Canada (Music Canada)	4× Platinum	400,000^{^}
Denmark (IFPI Danmark)	Platinum	20,000^{‡}
France (SNEP)	Platinum	400,000^{*}
Germany (BVMI)	Platinum	540,000
Greece (IFPI Greece)	Gold	50,000
Italy (FIMI) sales since 2009	Platinum	50,000^{‡}
Netherlands (NVPI)	Platinum	407,633
New Zealand (RMNZ)	Platinum	15,000^{^}
Sweden (GLF)	Silver	
Switzerland (IFPI Switzerland)	2× Platinum	100,000^{^}
United Kingdom (BPI)	2× Platinum	600,000^{^}
United States (RIAA)	2× Platinum	2,000,000^{^}
^{*} Sales figures based on certification alone.^{^} Shipments figures based on certification alone.^{‡} Sales+streaming figures based on certification alone.
