= David Knopfler =

British musician (born 1952)

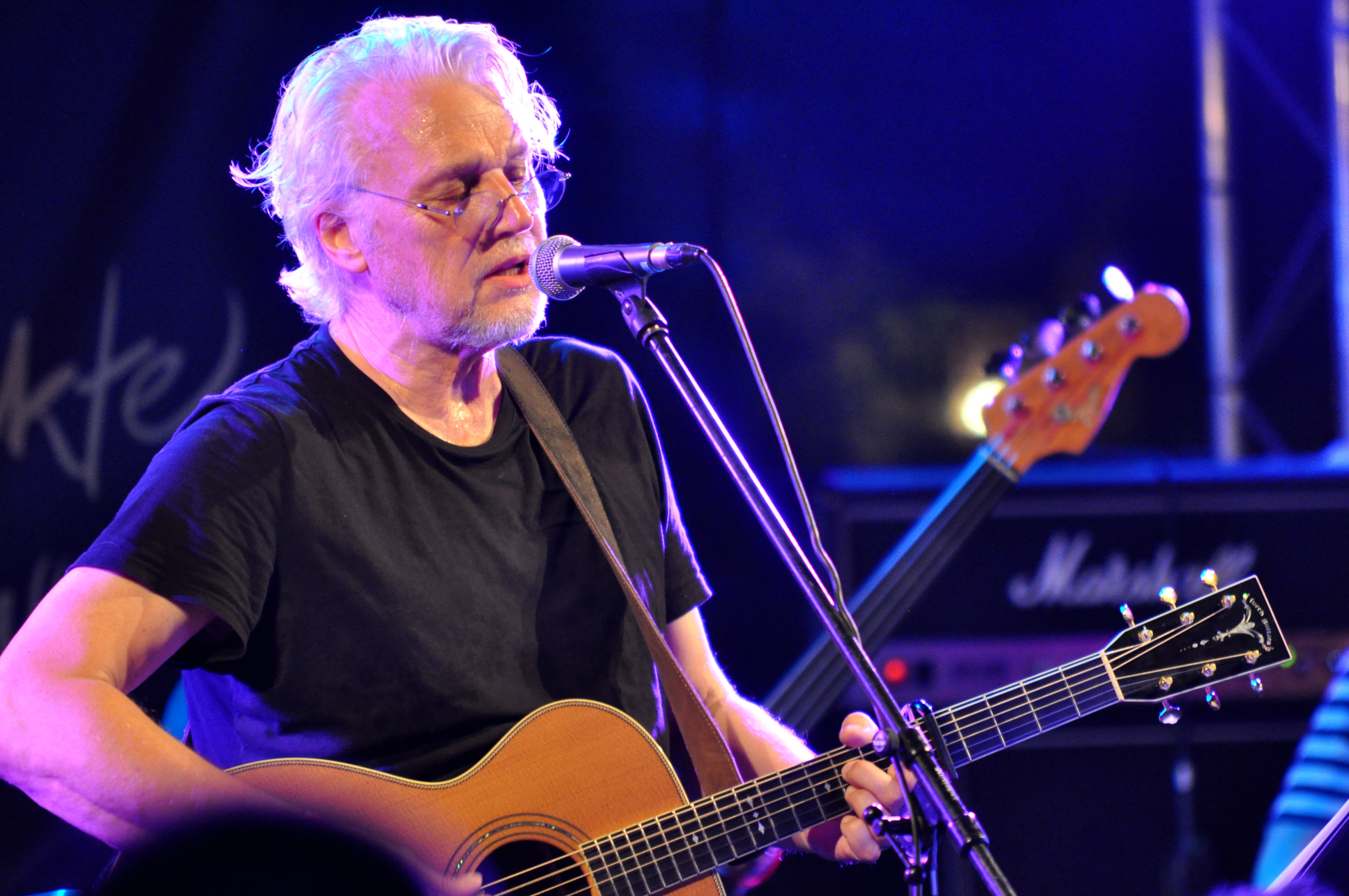
- Knopfler performing during 2017
- Born: 27 December 1952 (age 73); Glasgow, Scotland
- Relatives: Mark Knopfler (brother)
- Musical career
- Origin: Blyth, Northumberland, England
- Genres: Rock
- Occupations: Musician, singer-songwriter, record producer
- Instruments: Guitar, vocals
- Years active: 1977–present
- Labels: Phonogram, Cypress, Peach River, Ariola
- Formerly of: Dire Straits
- Past members: Mark Knopfler, John Illsley, and Pick Withers
- Website: knopfler.com

David Knopfler (born 27 December 1952) is a British musician. Together with his older brother Mark Knopfler, John Illsley, and Pick Withers, he founded the rock band Dire Straits in 1977, serving as rhythm guitarist on their first two albums. After quitting the band in 1980 during the recording of their third album, Knopfler embarked upon a solo career as a recording artist.

== Early life ==
Knopfler was born in Glasgow, to an English mother, Louisa Mary (née Laidler), a teacher, and a Hungarian Jewish father, Erwin Knopfler, an architect. When Knopfler was four, his family moved to Newcastle upon Tyne, where he grew up and later attended Gosforth Grammar School. By the age of 11, Knopfler owned a guitar, a piano and a drum kit, and by 14 he was playing and singing his own compositions in folk clubs. After graduating from Bristol Polytechnic with an honours degree in Economics, Knopfler became a social worker in London.

== Personal life ==
Knopfler is married to the former American art professor Leslie Stroz, who illustrates much of David's CD artwork. He lives with his family in Wolborough, which is a parish of Newton Abbott in Devon. Knopfler was an unsuccessful candidate in the 2023 Teignbridge District Council election, in which he stood as a representative for the South Devon Alliance.

== Career ==
=== Dire Straits ===
Knopfler introduced his older brother, guitarist Mark Knopfler, to his bassist flatmate John Illsley. After gaining the interest of drummer Pick Withers, the four founded the rock band Dire Straits. One of Mark's friends came up with the band's name, which was supposedly a reference to their financial situation at the time the band was beginning to gain notice in the music industry. David however, asserts on his website that "[the] notion that the band were literally in dire straits is largely retrospective myth making and not really factually supportable. We all had day jobs until we got a whacking big advance from Polygram."

Knopfler played rhythm guitar beside his brother, who was the lead guitarist, lead vocalist and the main composer in the band. David Knopfler appeared on Dire Straits' first two albums: Dire Straits (1978) and Communiqué (1979). The stress of composing, arranging songs, recording the then-requisite two albums and tours to support them took its toll on the brothers, and David left the band during the recording of their third album, Making Movies (1980), leaving him uncredited on the album.

=== Solo ===
After leaving Dire Straits, Knopfler released his first solo album, Release, in 1983. Mark Knopfler and John Illsley both played on the album. Harry Bogdanovs, a lifelong friend of Knopfler, is credited with having co-written three of the tracks and playing synthesiser. The album was supported by the single "Soul Kissing" on the label of Peach River Records. The single peaked at No. 87 in the UK Singles Chart, after Knopfler retrieved the rights from the bankrupt record label.

Behind the Lines, his second album, was released in 1985 and his third solo album, Cut the Wire, followed in 1986. In 1988, the U.S. label Cypress Records released his fourth album, Lips Against the Steel.

Knopfler scored the soundtracks for the films Shergar (1984) and Laser Mission (1989), and the German productions Treffer (1984), Jakob hinter der blauen Tür (1989) and The Great Bellheim.

Lifelines in 1991 released by Phonogram, was recorded in Peter Gabriel's Real World Studios. That album was followed in 1993 by The Giver, released by MESA/Bluemoon in the U.S., and Ariola in Europe. Its sparse, acoustic arrangements received positive reviews, as did 1995's Small Mercies, which Knopfler co-produced with Harry Bogdanovs, featuring Chris White on saxophone. In 2001, Knopfler worked with Bogdanovs again to co-produce the album Wishbones, which has guest appearances by Chris Rea and Eddi Reader. His ninth solo album, Ship of Dreams, which featured Chris Rea as guest guitarist, was released in 2004.

In May 2005, Knopfler published a book of poetry, Blood Stones and Rhythmic Beasts, which was released by the UK's BlackWing books (ISBN 0955026008).

The Canadian jazz label Justin Time Records released Ship of Dreams in October 2005 with an alternate rendition of "Tears Fall" featuring Megan Slankard (replacing Julia Neigel on the original European release). Knopfler's tenth solo album Songs for the Siren was released in 2006. Songwriting projects with other artists have included sessions with Amilia Spicer, Mack Starks, Megan Slankard and Wendy Lands.

He played various acoustic and electric gigs in Germany, Switzerland, Austria, Canada, Turkey and Australia from 2007 to 2009 with Harry Bogdanovs and his band. The double CD Acoustic, containing unplugged renditions of new and old songs, was released in 2011.

Knopfler continued to tour in Spain, Germany, the UK, the United States and Canada in 2012 to 2015. The first-ever limited edition live album, Made in Germany (recorded in Erfurt, Germany during the 2012 tour with Bogdanovs), was released in April 2013 exclusively via CDBaby.com.

The album Last Train Leaving was released in 2020. Songs of Loss and Love was released in December 2020, with Shooting for the Moon (2021) and Skating on the Lake (2022). Crow Gifts was released in 2024.

== Discography with Dire Straits ==
- 1978 – Dire Straits
- 1979 – Communiqué
- 1980 – Making Movies (Knopfler left the band toward the end of recording sessions in August 1980, and does not appear on the final release as his contribution was re-recorded. There are, however, a number of pieces of video showing him playing tracks from the album, among them "Solid Rock" and "Les Boys")
- 1988 – Money for Nothing (compilation)
- 1995 – Live at the BBC
- 1998 – Sultans of Swing: The Very Best of Dire Straits (compilation)
- 2005 – The Best of Dire Straits & Mark Knopfler: Private Investigations (compilation)
- 2015 – The Honky Tonk Demos (EP)
- 2023 – Live at the Rainbow, 1979

== Solo discography ==
- 1983 – Release
- 1985 – Behind the Lines
- 1986 – Cut The Wire
- 1988 – Lips Against The Steel
- 1991 – Lifelines
- 1993 – The Giver
- 1995 – Small Mercies
- 2001 – Wishbones
- 2004 – Ship of Dreams
- 2006 – Songs For The Siren
- 2009 – Anthology: 1983–2008
- 2011 – Acoustic (with Harry Bogdanovs)
- 2013 – Made In Germany (Live in Erfurt) (with Harry Bogdanovs)
- 2015 – Grace
- 2016 – Anthology Vol. 2 & 3
- 2019 – Heartlands
- 2020 – Last Train Leaving
- 2020 – Songs of Loss and Love
- 2021 – Anthology Volume Four
- 2021 – Shooting For The Moon
- 2022 – Skating On The Lake
- 2024 – Crow Gifts

== See also ==
- List of film score composers
- List of people from Newcastle upon Tyne
- List of poets
- List of rhythm guitarists
