= Lester Bookbinder =

American photographer and commercial director

Lester Bookbinder (1929 – 9 January 2017) was an American photographer and commercial director who worked in the United Kingdom.

Bookbinder trained with Rouben Samberg before moving to London. He established a career as a prominent fine art and studio advertising photographer, best-known for complicated compositions and studio effect shots. He also directed advertisements and the music videos for songs including "Romeo and Juliet" by Dire Straits.
