= Pick Withers =

English drummer (born 1948)

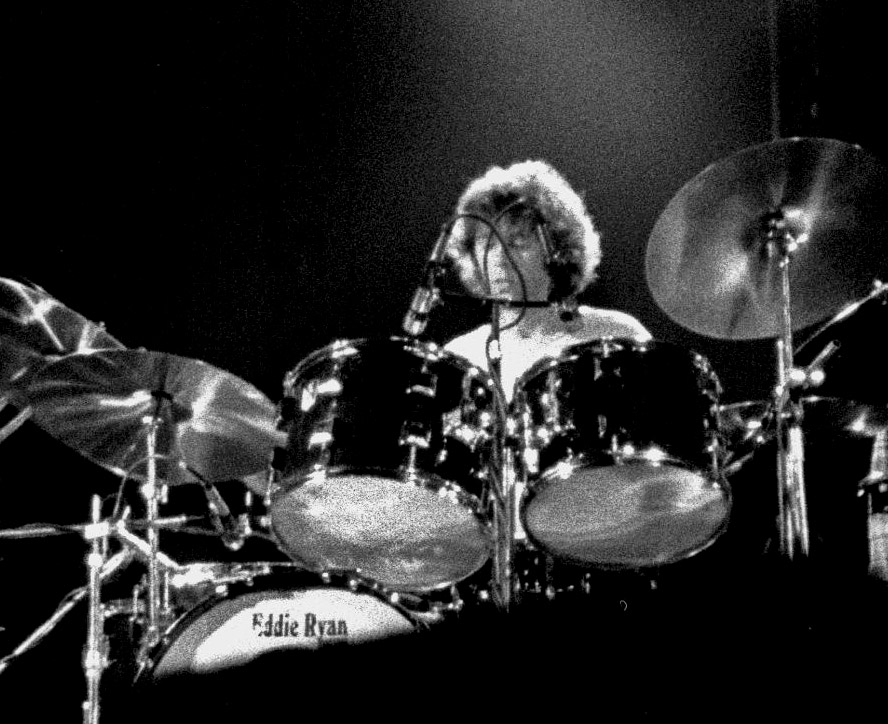
- Withers performing with Dire Straits in 1978

Background information
- Also known as: Pick Withers, Pique Withers, Pic Withers
- Born: David Withers; 4 April 1948 (age 78); Leicester, England
- Genres: Roots rock, folk rock, pub rock, R&B
- Occupations: Musician, producer
- Instrument: Drums
- Years active: 1964–present
- Formerly of: Dave Edmunds; Magna Carta; Dire Straits

David "Pick" Withers (born 4 April 1948) is an English drummer. He was the original drummer of the rock band Dire Straits and played on their first four albums, which included hit singles such as "Sultans of Swing", "Romeo and Juliet" and "Private Investigations". Withers was inducted into the Rock and Roll Hall of Fame as a member of Dire Straits in 2018.

== Biography ==
Taught by childhood friend Richard Storer, Withers first played a drum in the Boys' Brigade in his home city of Leicester. He became a professional musician at the age of 17, in an Italian band called The Primitives. This was followed by a band called Spring who had a record contract but little success; they released one album on the RCA label. In the mid-1970s Withers was a house drummer at Rockfield Studios near Monmouth, Wales. He played on records by Dave Edmunds, Michael Chapman, Hobo, the John Dummer Band and the Gary Fletcher Band, amongst others. He was also briefly with Magna Carta.

His nickname has been subject to some variations in spelling. During his time with Spring, he was billed as "Pique Withers". He is billed as "Pic Withers" on the second Brewers Droop album.

Withers has also studied at Drumtech drum school in London.

== Dire Straits ==
He met Mark Knopfler c. 1976 in North London. Knopfler called around to the house Withers was living in to borrow Simon Cowe's reel-to-reel tape recorder, and recorded some music with Withers that same day. Withers was briefly a member of folk-rock outfit Magna Carta in 1977, but once Dire Straits gained a recording contract, turned to drumming for that band full-time.

His style with Dire Straits is distinctive for being restrained, favouring sparse snare drum and hi-hat combinations rather than heavy beats, speed and technical flourishes. He played on the Dire Straits albums Dire Straits (1978), Communiqué (1979), Making Movies (1980) and Love Over Gold (1982).

Withers left Dire Straits in the summer of 1982, soon after completing the Love Over Gold sessions. In a 2021 interview in which he was asked why he left, Withers said that the band was becoming too loud, he was tired of the treadmill, and he wanted to try new things. His replacement in Dire Straits was Terry Williams, who like Withers had been a Dave Edmunds sideman.

== Later career ==
In 2021, Withers re-surfaced with a new rhythm and blues band called 'Slim Pickin's', later renamed 'Pick's Pocket'.

== Discography ==
=== With others ===
- Spring (1971), Spring
- Wrecked Again (1971), Michael Chapman
- The Booze Brothers, (rec. 1973, rel. 1989) Brewers Droop
- How Long Is Forever? (1973), Prelude
- A Rare Conundrum, (1977) Bert Jansch
- Slow Train Coming (1979), Bob Dylan
- Sleepwalking (1982), Gerry Rafferty
- Giant From The Blue (2011), Gary Fletcher Band
