= John Illsley =

English musician

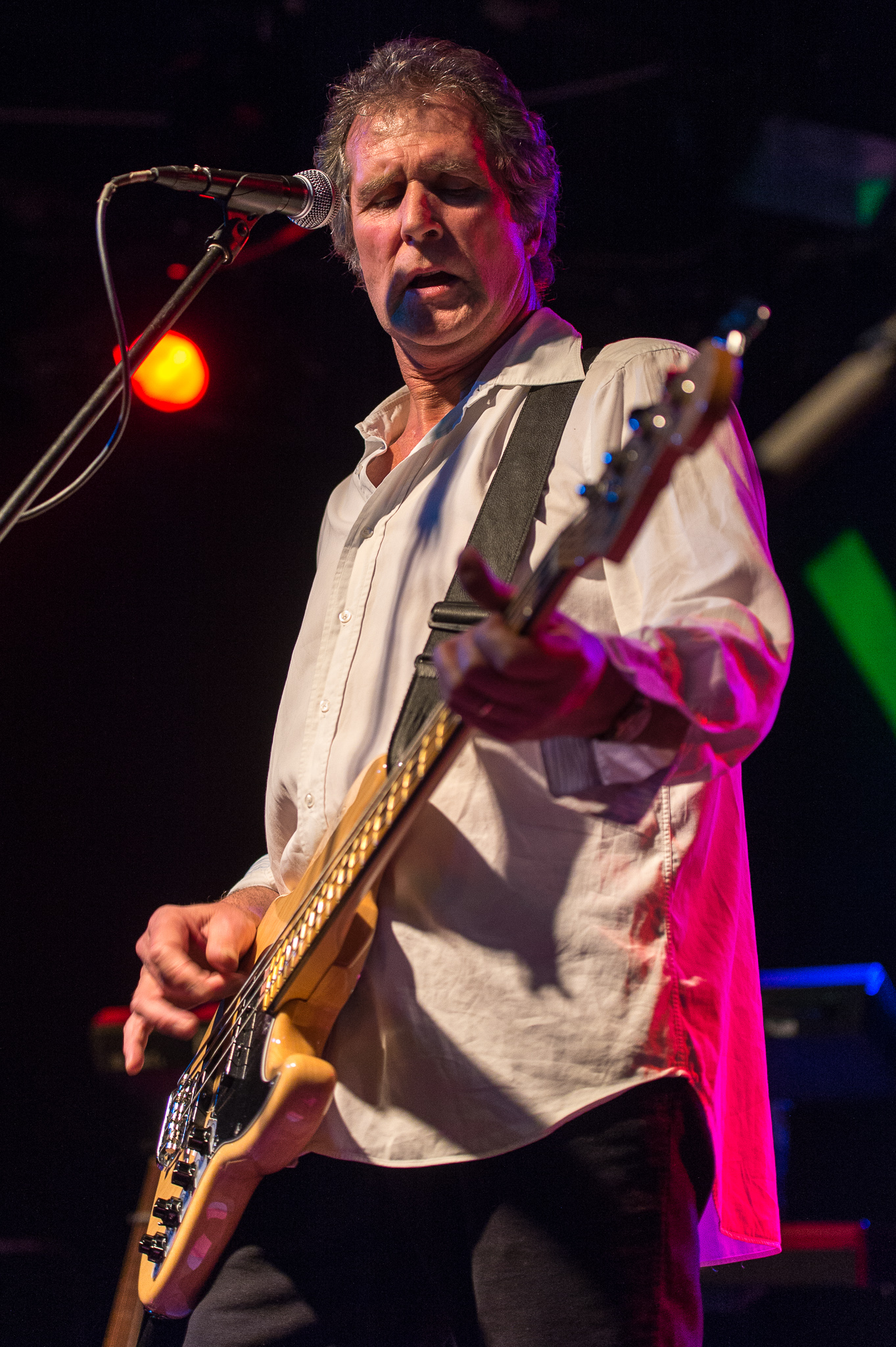
- Illsley playing in 2015

Background information
- Born: John Edward Illsley; 24 June 1949 (age 77); Leicester, England
- Genres: Rock, blues rock
- Occupations: Musician, songwriter, producer
- Instruments: Bass guitar, guitar, vocals
- Years active: 1966–present
- Formerly of: Dire Straits
- Past members: Mark Knopfler, David Knopfler, and Pick Withers
- Website: www.johnillsley.com

John Edward Illsley (born 24 June 1949) is an English musician, best known as bassist of the rock band Dire Straits. He has received multiple BRIT and Grammy Awards, and a Heritage Award.

As one of the founding band members, alongside drummer Pick Withers and guitarist brothers Mark Knopfler and David Knopfler, Illsley played a role in the development of Dire Straits' sound. Illsley and Mark Knopfler were the only members of the band to remain across its entire history. Illsley was inducted into the Rock and Roll Hall of Fame as a member of Dire Straits in 2018.

Illsley has produced two albums of his own, with Mark Knopfler as a guest musician, and has helped with Mark's personal projects and charities. He released two more albums, influenced by the Celtic-based band Cunla.

== Biography ==
=== Early life ===
Illsley was born in Leicester in June 1949, the fourth of four children of Wilfred Illsley and Florence (née Robinson). His mother was the daughter of a schoolmaster; his father was in the Royal Signals Corps in north Africa and Sicily during World War II. Illsley grew up in Market Harborough, on the border of Leicestershire and Northamptonshire, "in the heart of Middle England". His parents, "both Leicestershire born and bred", moved there when he was four, and his childhood memories include searching for sticklebacks in the River Jordan in nearby Little Bowden. Illsley attended Bromsgrove School, Worcestershire, and a further education college near Kettering, Northamptonshire, before starting work as a management trainee for a timber firm. He later studied Sociology at Goldsmiths College, University of London, and opened a record shop with his girlfriend.

In Deptford, south London, Illsley shared a flat with guitarist David Knopfler and met David's older brother, Mark, whose marriage had broken up. He was playing music in local pubs, and Illsley recalls that he returned home early one morning and "walked into the lounge room and saw this figure lying on the floor... asleep ... with a guitar over his legs, and he'd... fallen asleep on the floor while he was playing... his head was sort of cranked back, and there was an ashtray with cigarette butts and coffee on the floor... "

David Knopfler was keen to start a band, and Illsley played bass guitar and had the same musical interests. Convinced that they could make a success of it, with David's brother Mark as lead guitarist and vocalist, David playing rhythm guitar, Illsley on bass and a friend, Pick Withers, as drummer, the four formed a band, eventually named Dire Straits, which according to rumour is because they gave up their day jobs and were in financial "dire straits" by the time their band became popular. However, David Knopfler denies this on his personal website: "The notion that the band were literally in dire straits is largely retrospective myth making and not really factually supportable. We all had day jobs until we got a whacking big advance from Polygram." In contrast, Illsley himself said that "We were living on next to nothing and weren't even able to pay the gas bill." He added that they "weren't called Dire Straits for nothing".

=== Dire Straits ===
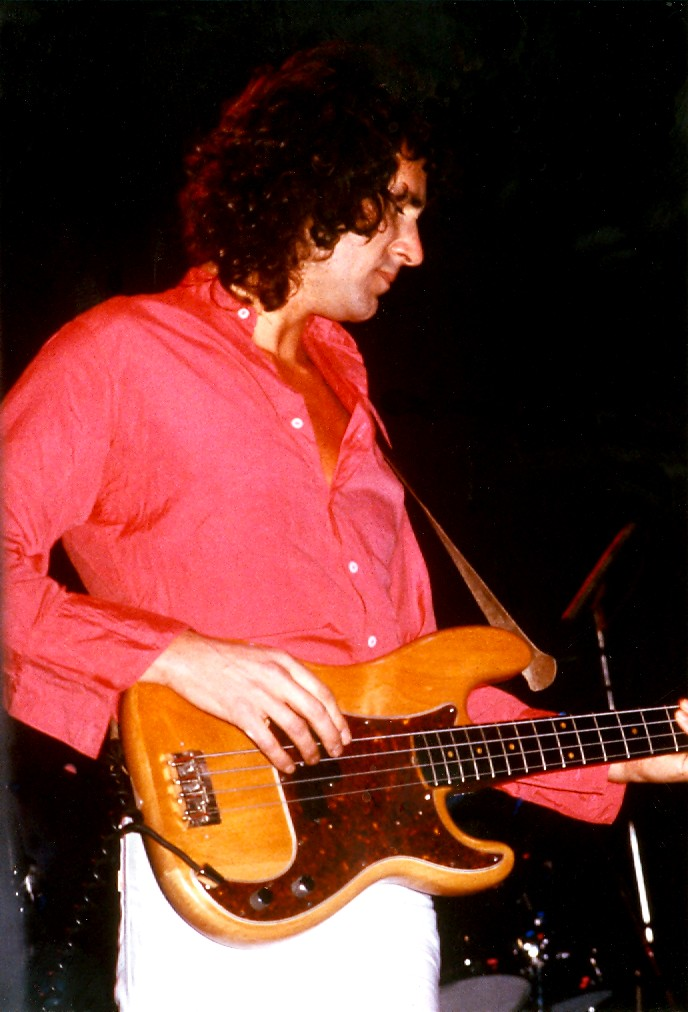
Illsley playing with Dire Straits, June 1979

As well as playing bass on all the Dire Straits recordings, Illsley also contributed backing vocals, with David Knopfler, and both harmonised to Mark's lead vocals and guitar in concert, and on the band's first two studio albums, Dire Straits and Communiqué.

During a period when most major labels expected bands to compose and record one to two albums per year, as well as tour to support them, tensions grew between David Knopfler and his elder brother Mark. Mark wrote nearly every song, was the frontman, and had, in a short time, become a virtuoso on the guitar. During the recording sessions for their third project, Making Movies, David left the band over creative differences with his brother, who had assumed the role of leader.

The band hired Hal Lindes to replace David, who stayed with the band for five years, and keyboards were added when Alan Clark joined the band in 1980. Illsley and Mark Knopfler were the only founding members to remain in Dire Straits until the group's dissolution in 1995. Illsley unsuccessfully tried to persuade Mark Knopfler to reform the group. In his November 2021 autobiography My Life in Dire Straits, Illsley confirms that Knopfler had no interest in reforming Dire Straits.

Before Dire Straits disbanded, Illsley released two solo albums, Never Told a Soul (1984) and Glass (1988). Knopfler contributed some of the guitar parts on each. He was inducted as a member of Dire Straits into the Rock and Roll Hall of Fame in 2018, giving a speech during the ceremony on behalf of the band.

=== Cunla ===
In March 2005, in a pub in Leicestershire, Illsley happened upon an Irish Celtic rock group, Cunla. For the first time since 1993 he took to the stage and played a couple of Dire Straits numbers with the band. Cunla subsequently played at a summer party Illsley was hosting in Hampshire. He then appeared with them on several occasions, most notably on 23 September 2006 at Cathedrale d'Image in Les Baux de Provence, France. This performance was recorded and subsequently released as an album in 2007. With Illsley, they covered a couple of Dire Straits numbers, albeit in an Irish style, with Johnny Owens replacing all keyboards and brass parts with traditional Irish violin. They also have a large amount of their own material, much of it penned by singer-songwriter Greg Pearle.

In October 2008, Creek Records released an album, Beautiful You, by Pearle and Illsley, who embarked on a tour of Ireland. Illsley collaborated with Pearle and Paul Brady on the song "One" and featured in the accompanying music video (2008). "One" was also the theme song for the Irish film Anton.

== Personal life ==
Illsley now lives in Hampshire, with his second wife Stephanie and his four children. He also spends time at his home in Provence, France. He owns a local pub, the 'East End Arms', located in the hamlet of East End between Lymington and Beaulieu, and which has been listed by critics as one of the "Fifty Best Pubs Around Britain". He is also a partner in two nearby hotels: The Master Builder's House Hotel near Beaulieu and The George Hotel on the Isle of Wight. Illsley is a keen painter and the first exhibition of his work was shown at the Nevill Keating McIlroy Gallery, Pickering Place, London in 2007.

In August 2014, Illsley was one of 200 public figures who were signatories to a letter to The Guardian opposing Scottish independence in the run-up to September's referendum on that issue.

In 2019 Illsley appeared in the final episode of BBC's Rick Stein’s Secret France where he dined with Rick Stein at a restaurant near his home in Provence. In November 2021, Illsley published his autobiography, My Life in Dire Straits.

== Solo discography ==
=== Studio albums ===
- 1984 – Never Told a Soul
- 1988 – Glass
- 2008 – Beautiful You (with Greg Pearle)
- 2010 – Streets of Heaven
- 2014 – Testing the Water
- 2016 – Long Shadows
- 2019 – Coming Up for Air
- 2022 – VIII

=== Live albums ===
- 2007 – Live in Les Baux de Provence (with Cunla and Greg Pearle)
- 2014 – Live in London
