= Gerry Rafferty discography =

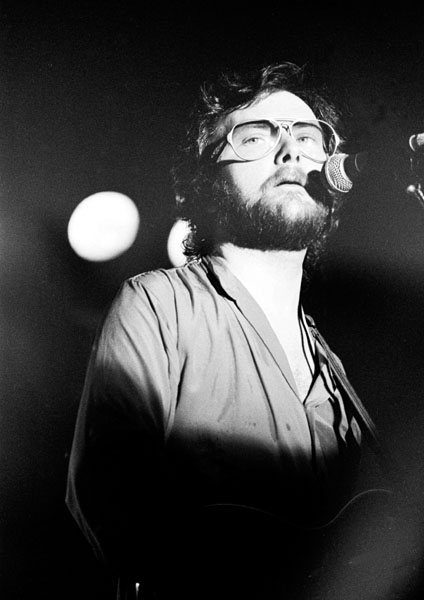
- Rafferty performing at Dublin's National Stadium on 6 September 1980
- Studio albums: 11
- Compilation albums: 8
- Singles: 23
- Music videos: 10

This is the discography of Scottish rock singer-songwriter Gerry Rafferty. He is best known for his solo hits "Baker Street", "Right Down the Line" and "Night Owl", as well as "Stuck in the Middle with You", recorded with the band Stealers Wheel.

== Albums ==
=== Studio albums ===
Title	Details	Peak chart positions										Certifications
Title	Details	UK	AUS	AUT	GER	NOR	NL	NZ	SWE	SWI	US	Certifications
Can I Have My Money Back?	Released: 1971; Label: Transatlantic; Formats: Digital download, CD, vinyl	—	—	—	—	—	—	—	—	—	—	
City to City	Released: 20 January 1978; Label: United Artists; Formats: Digital download, CD, vinyl	6	3	9	3	—	5	6	9	—	1	BPI: Gold; AUS: 2× Platinum; RIAA: Platinum
Night Owl	Released: 18 May 1979; Label: United Artists; Formats: Digital download, CD, vinyl	9	18	—	18	—	8	30	23	—	29	BPI: Gold; RIAA: Gold
Snakes and Ladders	Released: 11 April 1980; Label: United Artists; Formats: Digital download, CD, vinyl	15	31	—	34	—	17	—	36	—	61	BPI: Silver
Sleepwalking	Released: September 1982; Label: Liberty; Formats: Digital download, CD, vinyl	39	80	—	—	30	26	—	—	—	—	
North and South	Released: May 1988; Label: London; Formats: Digital download, CD, vinyl	43	—	—	20	—	23	—	24	16	—	
On a Wing and a Prayer	Released: December 1992; Label: Avalanche; Formats: Digital download, CD	73	—	—	87	—	—	—	—	—	—	
Over My Head	Released: 1994; Label: Avalanche; Formats: Digital download, CD	—	—	—	—	—	—	—	—	—	—	
Another World	Released: 2000; Label: Hypertension Music; Formats: Digital download, CD	—	—	—	78	—	—	—	—	—	—	
Life Goes On	Released: 30 November 2009; Label: Hypertension Music; Formats: Digital download, CD	—	—	—	—	—	—	—	—	—	—	
Rest in Blue	Released: 3 September 2021; Label: Metanoia Music; Formats: Digital download, CD	73	—	—	—	—	—	—	—	63	—	
"—" denotes a recording that did not chart or was not released in that territory.

=== Compilation albums ===
Title	Details	Peak chart positions		Certifications
Title	Details	UK	GER	Certifications
Gerry Rafferty (Note: Rafferty's 1969 & 1970 Humblebums recordings – plus one 1971 solo track.)	Released: 1974; Label: Transatlantic; Formats: Digital download, CD	—	—	
The First Chapter	Released: 1984; Label: Cambra; Formats: Digital download, CD	—	—	
Right Down the Line: The Best of Gerry Rafferty	Released: 13 November 1989; Label: EMI USA; Formats: Digital download, CD	—	62	
One More Dream: The Very Best of Gerry Rafferty	Released: 1995; Label: PolyGram TV; Formats: Digital download, CD	17	—	BPI: Gold
The Transatlantic Years – The Collection	Released: 1995; Label: Castle Music UK; Formats: Digital download, CD	—	—	
Baker Street	Released: 1998; Label: Disky; Formats: Digital download, CD	—	—	BPI: Gold
Days Gone Down: The Anthology: 1970–1982	Released: 2006; Label: Raven; Formats: Digital download, CD	—	—	
Gerry Rafferty & Stealers Wheel: Collected	Released: 2011; Label: Universal Music; Formats: Digital download, CD	—	—	
"—" denotes a recording that did not chart or was not released in that territory.

== Singles ==
Title	Year	Peak chart positions										Certifications	Album
Title	Year	UK	AUS	AUT	BEL (FL)	GER	NL	NZ	SWI	US	US AC	Certifications	Album
"Can I Have My Money Back?"	1971	—	70	—	—	—	—	—	—	—	—		Can I Have My Money Back?
"City to City"	1977	—	87	—	20	—	23	—	—	—	—		City to City
"Baker Street"	1978	3	1	4	9	3	16	4	2	2	4	BPI: Platinum; RIAA: Gold; RMNZ: 2× Platinum	City to City
"Right Down the Line"	1978	—	93	—	—	—	—	33	—	12	1	BPI: Gold; RMNZ: 2× Platinum	City to City
"Home and Dry"	1978	—	—	—	—	—	—	—	—	28	26		City to City
"The Ark"	1978	—	—	—	—	—	—	—	—	—	—		City to City
"Whatever's Written in Your Heart"	1978	—	—	—	—	—	—	—	—	—	—		City to City
"Night Owl"	1979	5	64	—	—	—	—	—	—	—	—	BPI: Silver	Night Owl
"Days Gone Down"	1979	—	—	—	—	—	—	—	—	17	17		Night Owl
"Get It Right Next Time"	1979	30	90	—	—	—	—	—	—	21	15		Night Owl
"Bring It All Home"	1980	54	—	—	—	—	—	—	—	—	—		Snakes and Ladders
"Royal Mile (Sweet Darlin')"	1980	67	52	—	—	—	—	—	—	54	—		Snakes and Ladders
"Sleepwalking"	1982	—	87	—	—	—	—	—	—	—	—		Sleepwalking
"Shipyard Town"	1988	—	75	—	—	—	—	—	—	—	—		North & South
"Baker Street" (Remix)	1990	53	—	—	—	—	—	—	—	—	—		Non-album Single
"Get Out of My Life Woman"	1992	82	—	—	—	—	—	—	—	—	—		On a Wing and a Prayer
"It's Easy to Talk"	1992	—	—	—	—	—	—	—	—	—	—		On a Wing and a Prayer
"Don't Give Up on Me"	1992	—	—	—	—	51	61	—	—	—	—		On a Wing and a Prayer
"I Could Be Wrong"	1992	77	—	—	—	—	—	—	—	—	—		On a Wing and a Prayer
"A New Beginning"	1994	—	—	—	—	67	—	—	—	—	—		Over My Head
"Keep It to Yourself"	2003	—	—	—	—	—	—	—	—	—	—		Another World (2003 reissue)
"Slow Down"	2021	—	—	—	—	—	—	—	—	—	—		Rest in Blue
"Lost Highway"	2021	—	—	—	—	—	—	—	—	—	—		Rest in Blue
"—" denotes a recording that did not chart or was not released in that territory.

== Other appearances ==
Album	Year	Artist	Notes
Sunnyvista	1979	Richard and Linda Thompson	Backing vocals
Local Hero	1983	Mark Knopfler	Lead vocals on "The Way It Always Starts".

== Music videos ==
Year	Title	Album
1978	"Baker Street"	City to City
1978	"Whatever's Written in Your Heart"	City to City
1979	"Night Owl"	Night Owl
1979	"Days Gone Down"	Night Owl
1979	"Get It Right Next Time"	Night Owl
1979	"It's Gonna Be a Long Night"	Night Owl
1980	"Bring It All Home"	Snakes and Ladders
1982	"Sleepwalking"	Sleepwalking
1988	"Shipyard Town"	North & South
1992	"Don't Give Up on Me"	On a Wing and a Prayer
