= Snakes and Ladders (Gerry Rafferty album) =

Studio album by Gerry Rafferty
- Released: 11 April 1980
- Studio: Chipping Norton Recording Studios (Oxon, England); AIR Studios (Montserrat).
- Genre: Rock
- Length: 48:44
- Label: United Artists
- Producer: Gerry Rafferty, Hugh Murphy

Gerry Rafferty chronology
Night Owl (1979)	Snakes and Ladders (1980)	Sleepwalking (1982)

Professional ratings
Review scores
Source	Rating
AllMusic	3.5/5 stars
Smash Hits	8½/10

Snakes and Ladders is the fourth album by Gerry Rafferty. It was released in 1980, following the success of his previous two albums, City to City and Night Owl. The album charted at No. 15 in the UK but only reached No. 61 in the US, while singles achieved number 54 UK ("Bring It All Home"), and number 67UK / number 54 US ("The Royal Mile"). The album was released on CD in 1998 [EMI 7 46609-2] but deleted soon after that, and it got reissued on CD in August 2012 as a two-CD set with "Sleepwalking."

Some of the songs are available on compilation albums. Four of the songs, "The Garden of England", "I Was a Boy Scout", "Welcome to Hollywood" and "Bring It All Home" were recorded at Beatles producer George Martin's AIR studio in Montserrat. All the songs were original Rafferty compositions, though one – "Johnny's Song" – was a remake of a song which had been previously released by his former band Stealers Wheel, and another – "Didn't I" – was a remake of a song from Rafferty's 1971 album Can I Have My Money Back?.

"The Garden of England" ends with an extract from William Whitelaw's "short, sharp shock" speech that he delivered in 1979.

== Track listing ==
All tracks composed by Gerry Rafferty

1. "The Royal Mile" – 3:48
2. "I Was a Boy Scout" – 4:15
3. "Welcome to Hollywood" – 5:17
4. "Wastin' Away" – 3:29
5. "Look at the Moon" – 2:18
6. "Bring It All Home" – 4:40
7. "The Garden of England" – 4:08
8. "Johnny's Song" – 3:25
9. "Didn't I" – 4:14
10. "Syncopatin Sandy" – 4:24
11. "Café Le Cabotin" – 4:51
12. "Don't Close the Door" – 3:45

== Charts ==
Album

Chart (1980)	Position
Australia (Kent Music Report)	31
Germany	34
Netherlands	17
United Kingdom	15
United States	61

== Certifications ==
Certifications for Snakes and Ladders
Region	Certification	Certified units/sales
United Kingdom (BPI)	Silver	60,000^{^}
^{^} Shipments figures based on certification alone.

== Personnel ==
- Gerry Rafferty – vocals, acoustic guitar (1–3, 9, 11), backing vocals (9)
- Ian Lynn – keyboards (1, 5, 8, 10, 11), synthesizers (3, 7)
- Billy Livsey – acoustic piano (2, 3, 6), clavinet (3), mystery voice (3), Polymoog (6), keyboards (7), pianica (11)
- Pete Wingfield – organ (2, 6, 12), acoustic piano (12)
- Bryn Haworth – slide guitar (2, 12)
- Jerry Donahue – lead guitar (3), guitar swells (3), other guitars (4, 6, 8, 9, 11)
- Richard Brunton – guitars (3, 6, 7, 11), electric guitars (12)
- Mo Foster – bass (1–3, 6, 7, 11, 12)
- Pete Zorn – bass (4, 8, 9, 10)
- Liam Genockey – drums (1–4, 6–12)
- Frank Ricotti – percussion (1, 3, 4, 8, 11), congas (2), tambourine (9), woodblocks (10)
- Richard Harvey – penny whistle (1)
- Raphael Ravenscroft – saxophone (3, 6)
- Chris Mercer – brass arrangements (2)
- Wil Malone – string arrangements (5, 7, 10), clarinet arrangements (10)
- Gavyn Wright – string leader (5, 7, 10)
- Betsy Cook – backing vocals (9)
- The Baron de Bon Bon – intro (11)

== Production ==
- Gerry Rafferty – producer
- Hugh Murphy – producer
- Barry Hammond – recording (1, 4, 5, 8–12), overdubbing (2, 3, 6, 7)
- Stephen Lipson – recording (2, 3, 6, 7)
- John Patrick Byrne – cover
- Michael Gray – inner sleeve photography, inner sleeve concept, management
