= Baker Street (disambiguation) =

Baker Street is a street in London, England, UK.

Baker Street may also refer to:

- "Baker Street" (song) by Gerry Rafferty, first released in 1978
- Baker Street (album), a 1998 compilation album by Gerry Rafferty
- Baker Street (comics), published between 1989 and 1991
- Baker Street, a working title for the 2008 feature film The Bank Job
- Baker Street (musical) (1965), based on Sherlock Holmes
- Baker Street (Nelson, BC), a historic street in Canada
- Baker Street, Essex, a location near Grays Thurrock in England
- Baker Street tube station on the London Underground
- Baker Street Station (Fort Wayne, Indiana), a former Pennsylvania Railroad station in Indiana
- "Baker Street", a euphemism for the Special Operations Executive, a British World War II organisation
- Baker Street, Singapore, a road in Seletar
- Baker Street, Hong Kong, a road in Hung Hom, Kowloon

== See also ==
- 221B Baker Street (disambiguation)
