= Sleepwalking (Gerry Rafferty album) =

Studio album by Gerry Rafferty
- Released: September 1982
- Studios: Chipping Norton Recording Studios (Oxon, England); Strawberry Studios South (Dorking, England)
- Genre: Rock
- Length: 37:20
- Label: Liberty
- Producers: Gerry Rafferty; Christopher Neil

Gerry Rafferty chronology
Snakes and Ladders (1980)	Sleepwalking (1982)	North and South (1988)

Professional ratings
Review scores
Source	Rating
AllMusic	2/5 stars

Sleepwalking is the fifth studio album by the Scottish singer songwriter Gerry Rafferty, released in September 1982. It is the follow-up to the 1980 album Snakes and Ladders. It would be Rafferty's last studio album for Liberty/United Artists, and his last for six years.

Sleepwalking was co-produced by Rafferty and Christopher Neil who went on to become the producer for Mike and the Mechanics. Unlike the previous Rafferty albums such as City to City and Night Owl there is considerable use of synthesisers and drum machine programming, some of the latter done by Christopher Neil, along with contributions from British session musicians including Hugh Burns, Mo Foster, Liam Genockey, Kenny Craddock, Morris Pert and Mel Collins.

Some tracks also feature members of Dire Straits, keyboardist Alan Clark and drummer Pick Withers; the following year, Rafferty would provide vocals for Dire Straits leader Mark Knopfler's soundtrack to the film Local Hero.

The album was reissued as a 2-CD set with Snakes and Ladders by EMI in August 2012.

The track "The Right Moment" from this album was later recorded by Olivia Newton-John in 1985 for her Soul Kiss album.

== Track listing ==
All tracks written and arranged by Gerry Rafferty

Side one

1. "Standing at the Gates" – 6:51
2. "Good Intentions" – 4:15
3. "A Change of Heart" – 4:10
4. "On the Way" – 4:24

Side two

5. "Sleepwalking" – 3:51
6. "Cat and Mouse" – 5:03
7. "The Right Moment" – 3:24
8. "As Wise as a Serpent" – 5:15

== Personnel ==
- Gerry Rafferty – lead and backing vocals, acoustic guitar (8)
- Kenny Craddock – acoustic piano (1), synthesizers (1, 3, 8), Hammond organ (1), electric guitars (3), keyboards (5), banjo (8)
- Alan Clark – acoustic piano (2, 7), organ (2), synthesizers (4, 6, 7), Hammond organ (4, 6)
- Ian Lynn – synthesizers (2, 4), sequencer (3), string synthesizer (7)
- Hugh Burns – electric guitars (1, 4, 5, 6, 8)
- Frank Bogie – electric guitars (3)
- Mo Foster – bass (1, 3, 4, 8)
- Liam Genockey – drums (1, 3, 5)
- Christopher Neil – drum programming (2), backing vocals (3, 5, 6, 8)
- Pick Withers – drums (4, 6)
- Morris Pert – percussion (1, 5, 6, 8)
- Frank Ricotti – percussion (4, 6)
- Mel Collins – saxophone (1)

== Production ==
- Christopher Neil – producer
- Gerry Rafferty – producer, arrangements
- Barry Hammond – recording (1, 3, 5, 8)
- Alan O'Duffy – recording (2, 4, 6, 7), overdubbing (3, 5, 8)
- Nick Ryan – mixing
- Ron McMaster – mastering
- Phil Jude – front cover photography, inner sleeve photography
- Gered Mankowitz – back cover photography

Studios

- Recorded at Chipping Norton Recording Studios (Oxon, England) and Strawberry Studios South (Dorking, England).
- Mixed at Audio International Studios (London, UK).
- Mastered at EMI America/Liberty Recording Studios (Hollywood, California).

== Charts ==
Chart (1982)	Position
Australia (Kent Music Report)	80
