= Baker Street (album) =

Greatest hits album by Gerry Rafferty
- Released: 1998
- Genre: Rock
- Length: 77:00
- Label: Disky

Gerry Rafferty chronology
Over My Head (1994)	Baker Street (1998)	Another World (2000)

Alternative Cover

Baker Street is a compilation album released in 1998 by Gerry Rafferty. It features 16 of his best hits from 1978 to 1982.

== Track listing ==
1. "Baker Street" – 6:11
2. "Right Down the Line" – 4:30
3. "City to City" – 5:05
4. "Waiting for the Day" – 5:47
5. "Get It Right Next Time" – 4:44
6. "Take the Money and Run" – 5:53
7. "Days Gone Down (Still Got The Light In Your Eyes)" – 6:32
8. "Why Won't You Talk to Me" – 4:02
9. "The Royal Mile" – 3:50
10. "Wastin' Away" – 3:31
11. "Bring it All Home" – 4:43
12. "Don't Close the Door" – 3:48
13. "Sleepwalking" – 3:53
14. "A Change of Heart" – 4:10
15. "On the Way" – 4:22
16. "Night Owl" – 6:10

== Certifications ==
Certifications for Baker Street
Region	Certification	Certified units/sales
United Kingdom (BPI)	Gold	100,000^{*}
^{*} Sales figures based on certification alone.
