= Alan Clark (keyboardist) =

British keyboardist (born 1952)

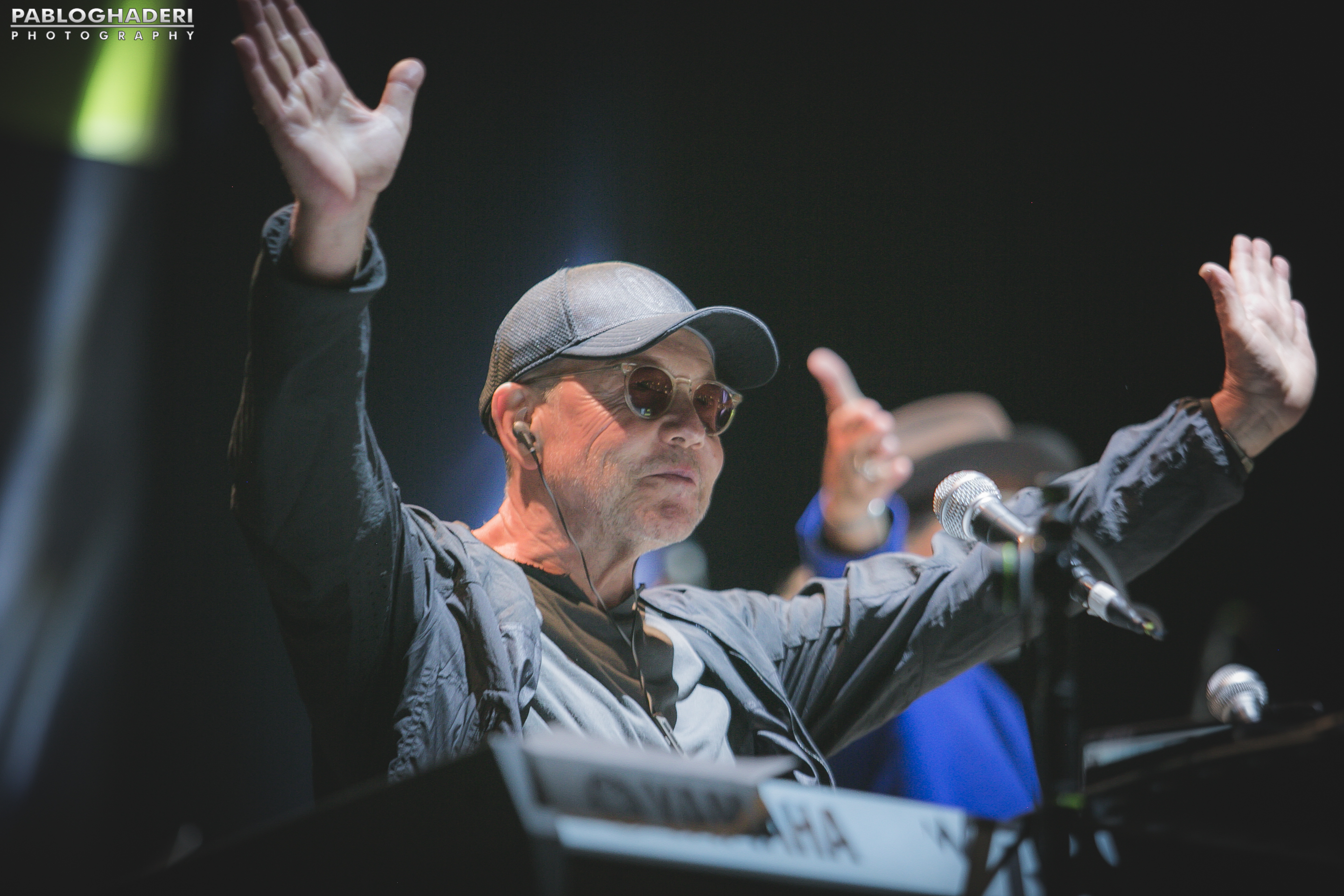
- Clark on stage in 2019

Background information
- Born: 5 March 1952 (age 74); Chester-le-Street, County Durham, England
- Genre: Rock
- Occupations: Musician; producer
- Instrument: Keyboards
- Years active: 1960s–present
- Formerly of: Dire Straits, Eric Clapton, Bob Dylan, Tina Turner, Trevor Horn
- Website: alanclarkmusic.com

Alan Clark (born 5 March 1952) is an English musician who was the first keyboardist and co-producer of the rock band Dire Straits. In 2018, he was inducted into the Rock and Roll Hall of Fame as a significant member of the band.

== Early life ==
As a six-year-old child, Clark received piano lessons. From the age of nine years, he taught himself. At the age of 13 and while still a pupil at Chester-le-Street Grammar School, he began to play Hammond organ in working men's clubs in the northeast of England, and thereafter forged a successful career in music which included playing with a reformed Geordie which featured Brian Johnson (who would later join AC/DC), playing and recording with a duo called Splinter who were signed to George Harrison's Dark Horse label, playing and recording with Gallagher & Lyle, and playing on a tour of major UK festivals with Lindisfarne.

== Career ==
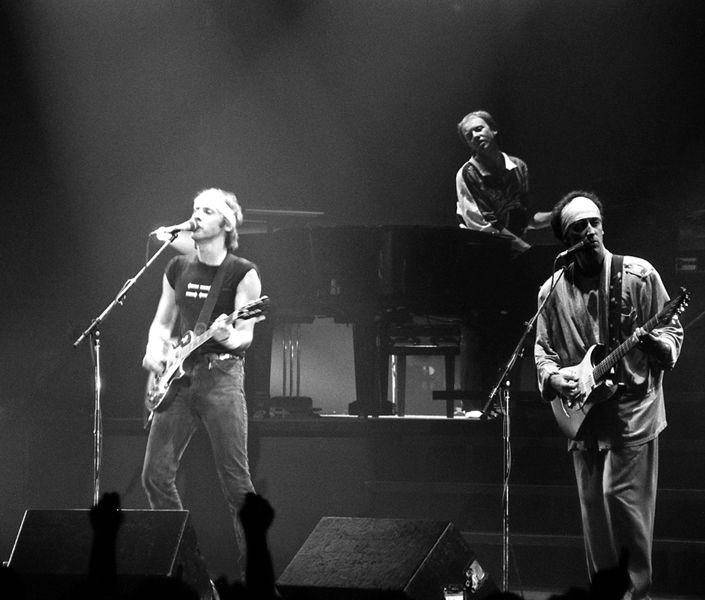
Clark (background) with Mark Knopfler (left) and Jack Sonni (right) performing with Dire Straits in Belgrade, May 1985

Clark joined Dire Straits in 1980, first appearing on their fourth studio album Love over Gold (1982). In 1983 he played on Bob Dylan's album Infidels and also on Dylan's following Empire Burlesque album. Clark also worked with Knopfler on some of his film soundtrack work, most notably Knopfler's most successful soundtrack on the film Local Hero, in which he also makes an appearance as a piano player. He has also worked with Mark's brother David on his solo albums. Throughout his time with Dire Straits, he also played on Tina Turner's album Private Dancer, played on Eric Clapton's album Journeyman and joined him on the Journeyman World Tour, as well as playing in the "Orchestra Nights" performances with the National Philharmonic Orchestra and Michael Kamen during Clapton's 24 Nights concerts at the Royal Albert Hall in 1990 and 1991. He co-wrote with Clapton the score for the film Communion (1989).

Clark has also played and recorded with other artists including, among others:

- Jon Anderson
- Joan Armatrading
- The Bee Gees
- The Blessing
- Rory Block
- Jamie Catto
- Phil Collins
- Robert Cray
- Roger Daltrey
- Bo Diddley
- Dire Straits Legacy
- Escape Club
- Gallagher and Lyle
- Geordie
- Al Green
- Buddy Guy
- George Harrison
- Mary Hopkin
- Mick Hucknall
- Billy Joel
- Elton John
- Brian Johnson
- David Knopfler
- Mark Knopfler
- Lindisfarne
- Matt Monro
- Jimmy Nail
- Pet Shop Boys
- Prefab Sprout
- Gerry Rafferty
- Lou Reed
- Seal
- Shakin Stevens
- Sky
- Sly and Robbie
- Dave Stewart
- Rod Stewart
- Van Morrison
- Robbie Williams
- Bruce Willis
- Westernhagen

In 2001, Clark composed the music for the long-running paranormal show Most Haunted. He has also composed music for TV shows and commercials.

In 2004, he performed the theme from Local Hero with Mark Knopfler at the opening of Alan Shearer's bar in Newcastle United football ground.

In 2005, he wrote, directed and scored a film, The Inspiration, to commemorate 25 years of the Great North Run, which was screened and performed live with the northern Philharmonic at Sage Gateshead.

In 2009, Clark reunited with Dire Straits band member John Illsley for a concert in San Vigilio, Italy, and with Illsley and Phil Palmer in 2010 at the XRoads club in Rome, playing a set of Dire Straits songs.

In 2011, he formed a band, the Straits, to play the music of Dire Straits at a charity show at the Albert Hall, which featured drummer Steve Ferrone from Tom Petty and the Heartbreakers, and Dire Straits' guitarist Phil Palmer. They went on to perform other successful shows as the Dire Straits Legacy, which included Dire Straits members Danny Cummings, Mel Collins, Jack Sonni, and producer/bass player Trevor Horn.

He is a member of a band called Dire Straits Legacy, which features himself, Phil Palmer, Steve Ferrone, Trevor Horn, Danny Cummings, Mel Collins, Primi de Biasse and Marco Caviglia, and in 2017 he wrote and produced, with Phil Palmer, an album for the band called Three Chord Trick.

In 2017, he recorded in Real World studios with Italian artist Pacifico.

He is a member of Trevor Horn's band and works/records with Horn on other projects.

In 2019, he co-produced with Trevor Horn and Phil Palmer, Renato Zero's hugely successful record Zero Il Folle and played on several major records including Trevor Horn Reimagines the Eighties and Rod Stewart's You're In My Heart.

In June 2019, he played a solo piano concert at the Milan Piano Festival.

In 2020, he co-wrote and co-produced several tracks on Renato Zero's hugely successful Zerosettanta album.

In September 2021, he released his solo piano record Backstory.

== Collaborations ==
- Lonesome No More – Gallagher and Lyle
- Love Over Gold – Dire Straits (1982)
- ExtendedancEPlay – Dire Straits (1983)
- Alchemy: Dire Straits Live – Dire Straits (1984)
- Brothers in Arms – Dire Straits (1985)
- On Every Street – Dire Straits (1991)
- On the Night – Dire Straits (1993)
- Sleepwalking – Gerry Rafferty (1982)
- Infidels – Bob Dylan (1983)
- Private Dancer – Tina Turner (1984)
- Empire Burlesque – Bob Dylan (1985)
- Down in the Groove – Bob Dylan (1988)
- Wild Wild West – Escape Club (1988)
- North and South – Gerry Rafferty (1988)
- The Shouting Stage – Joan Armatrading (1988)
- Journeyman – Eric Clapton (1989)
- Big River – Jimmy Nail (1995)
- Crocodile Shoes II – Jimmy Nail (1996)
- Still Waters – Bee Gees (1997)
- Andromeda Heights – Prefab Sprout (1997)
- Life Goes On – Gerry Rafferty (2009)
- Three Chord Trick – Legacy
- Zero il Folle – Renato Zero 2019
- Zerosettanta – Renato Zero 2020
- You're in my Heart – Rod Stewart
- Rest in Blue – Gerry Rafferty 2021
- Backstory – Alan Clark 2021
- I changed Many Houses – Tiromancino 2021
