= Night Owl (album) =

Studio album by Gerry Rafferty
- Released: 18 May 1979
- Recorded: 1978–1979
- Studios: Chipping Norton, Lansdowne
- Genre: Pop rock
- Length: 51:58
- Label: United Artists
- Producers: Hugh Murphy, Gerry Rafferty

Gerry Rafferty chronology
City to City (1978)	Night Owl (1979)	Snakes and Ladders (1980)

Night Owl is the third studio album by Scottish musician Gerry Rafferty. It was released a year after Rafferty's platinum-selling album City to City. While not quite performing as well as its predecessor, Night Owl still managed enough sales to achieve platinum status in Canada, gold in the United Kingdom, and gold status in the U.S. The title song reached No. 5 on the UK Singles Chart. The album made the Top 10 in the UK Albums Chart.

The album was recorded at Chipping Norton Recording Studios, Chipping Norton, England.

"Take the Money and Run" was recorded by Alvin Lee on the 1980 release Free Fall under the title "Take the Money."

== Re-releases ==
On 30 January 2007 Collectables Records released City To City and Night Owl as a two-disc set.

== Critical reception ==
Professional ratings
Review scores
Source	Rating
AllMusic	3.5/5 stars
MusicHound Rock: The Essential Album Guide	3/5 stars
Smash Hits	7/10

The Los Angeles Times called the songs "concise, wry tales of love and ambition, inventively arranged and sung in a dry whine that carries just the right amount of detachment."

== Track listing ==
All tracks are written by Gerry Rafferty.

No.	Title	Length
1.	"Days Gone Down (Still Got the Light in Your Eyes)"	6:31
2.	"Night Owl"	6:11
3.	"The Way That You Do It"	5:08
4.	"Why Won't You Talk to Me?"	3:59
5.	"Get It Right Next Time"	4:42
6.	"Take the Money and Run"	5:49
7.	"Family Tree"	5:58
8.	"Already Gone"	4:54
9.	"The Tourist"	4:14
10.	"It's Gonna Be a Long Night"	4:22

== Personnel ==
- Gerry Rafferty – vocals, acoustic piano (2, 9) Polymoog (2), acoustic guitar (3–8, 10), string arrangements
- Graham Preskett – acoustic piano (1, 4, 10), electric piano (2), string synthesizer (2), keyboards (6, 7), fiddles (6, 7), mandolin (10), string arrangements, string scoring and conductor
- Pete Wingfield – organ (1, 2, 3)
- Tommy Eyre – acoustic piano (3), electric piano (5), synthesizers (5)
- John Kirkpatrick – accordion (4, 6, 7)
- Richard Brunton – electric guitar (1, 3, 6, 7), lap steel guitar (1, 4, 10), acoustic guitar (3, 4, 7–10), guitar solo (7), guitars (10)
- Hugh Burns – electric guitar (1, 4), rhythm guitar (1, 9), guitar solo (1, 9), guitars (2, 5)
- Richard Thompson –mandolin (4), electric guitars (7, 8)
- Mo Foster – bass (1, 2, 4, 6–10)
- Gary Taylor – bass (3, 5)
- Liam Genockey – drums
- Frank Ricotti – percussion (1, 2, 5, 6, 8, 9)
- Raphael Ravenscroft – Lyricon (2), saxophone (5, 6, 9, 10)
- Richard Harvey – penny whistle (6), pipe organ (7), recorders (7), synthesizers (8, 9)
- Gavyn Wright – string leader
- Betsy Cook – backing vocals (1, 3)
- Barbara Dickson – backing vocals (1, 3, 7)
- Linda Thompson – backing vocals (1, 3)

Production

- Gerry Rafferty – producer
- Hugh Murphy – producer
- Barry Hammond – engineer (1, 2, 4, 6–10)
- Nick Patrick – engineer (3, 5)
- John Patrick Byrne – front cover painting
- Robert Ellis – photography

== Charts ==
Album

Chart (1979)	Position
Australia (Kent Music Report)	18
Germany	18
Netherlands	8
United Kingdom	9
US Billboard Pop Albums	29

Single

Year	Song	Chart	Position
1979	"Night Owl"	UK Top 40	5
1979	"Night Owl"	Ireland	5
1979	"Days Gone Down (Still Got the Light in Your Eyes)"	U.S. Billboard Pop Singles	17
1979	"Days Gone Down (Still Got the Light in Your Eyes)"	Canada RPM Adult Contemporary	8
1979	"Days Gone Down (Still Got the Light in Your Eyes)"	Canada RPM Top Singles	19
1979	"Days Gone Down (Still Got the Light in Your Eyes)"	U.S. Billboard Adult Contemporary	17
1979	"Get It Right Next Time"	U.S. Billboard Pop Singles	21
1979	"Get It Right Next Time"	U.S. Billboard Adult Contemporary	15
1979	"Get It Right Next Time"	UK Top 40	30
1979	"Get It Right Next Time"	Ireland	2
1979	"Get It Right Next Time"	Canada RPM Top Singles	52

== Certifications ==
Certifications for Night Owl
Region	Certification	Certified units/sales
United Kingdom (BPI)	Gold	100,000^{^}
^{^} Shipments figures based on certification alone.
