= Night Owl (Gerry Rafferty song) =

1979 single by Gerry Rafferty

Single by Gerry Rafferty

from the album Night Owl
- B-side: "Why Won't You Talk to Me"
- Released: 11 May 1979
- Recorded: 1978–1979
- Genre: Soft rock
- Length: 4:24 (7" single edit); 6:09 (12" and album version)
- Label: United Artists
- Songwriter(s): Gerry Rafferty
- Producer(s): Gerry Rafferty; Hugh Murphy

Gerry Rafferty singles chronology
"Whatever's Written in Your Heart" (1978)	"Night Owl" (1979)	"Days Gone Down" (1979)

"Night Owl" is a song by Gerry Rafferty. It is the second track on his 1979 album of the same name. It features a Lyricon solo played by "Baker Street" saxophonist Raphael Ravenscroft. An edited version, omitting one verse, made the top five on the UK Singles Chart, and along with "Baker Street" is one of two solo efforts by Gerry Rafferty to accomplish this feat.

== Inspiration ==
The song discusses themes of alcohol abuse, including autobiographical reflections delivered in the second person. It has been described by Rafferty's estate as a "memorable, top 30 melody with a pitiless self-portrait of an artist using alcohol to blur the edges of a world in which what is real, and valuable, is sometimes effusive".

== Release ==
Though the single was a top-five hit for Rafferty in his native United Kingdom, "Night Owl" was never released in this format in North America, at a time when interest in Rafferty was at its peak after the success of his single "Baker Street" and album City to City a year earlier. In the US, "Days Gone Down" was used as the lead single from Night Owl instead.

The B-side on the original "Night Owl" single was the fourth track from the same album, "Why Won't You Talk to Me".

== Charts ==
Chart (1979)	Peak Position
Australia (Kent Music Report)	64
UK Singles (Official Charts)	5

== Certifications ==
Certifications for "Night Owl"
Region	Certification	Certified units/sales
United Kingdom (BPI)	Silver	250,000^{^}
^{^} Shipments figures based on certification alone.
