= On a Wing and a Prayer =

Studio album by Gerry Rafferty
- Released: 28 September 1992
- Recorded: 1991–1992
- Studios: Tye Farm, Hartfield, East Sussex
- Genres: Rock, pop
- Length: 57:39
- Labels: Avalanche, Polydor
- Producers: Gerry Rafferty, Hugh Murphy

Gerry Rafferty chronology
North and South (1988)	On a Wing and a Prayer (1992)	Over My Head (1994)

On a Wing and a Prayer is the seventh studio album by Gerry Rafferty. The album includes three tracks co-written with Rafferty's brother Jim, also a singer-songwriter, who had been signed to Decca Records in the 1970s. The music was heavily influenced by Rafferty's divorce from his wife Carla Ventilla in 1990. They were married for 20 years. The album took eighteen months to produce and was released shortly after the completion of Rafferty's sold out UK tour.

== Track listing ==
All tracks composed by Gerry Rafferty; except where indicated.

1. "Time's Caught Up on You" - 4:21
2. "I See Red" (Jim Rafferty) - 4:05
3. "It's Easy to Talk" - 4:29
4. "I Could Be Wrong" - 3:59
5. "Don't Speak of My Heart" (Gerry Rafferty, Jim Rafferty) - 5:55
6. "Get Out of My Life Woman" (Allen Toussaint) - 4:11
7. "Don't Give Up on Me" - 4:59
8. "Hang On" - 4:00
9. "Love and Affection" - 6:25
10. "Does He Know What He's Taken On" - 4:56
11. "The Light of Love" (Gerry Rafferty, Jim Rafferty) - 4:57
12. "Life Goes On" - 5:22

== Personnel ==
- Gerry Rafferty – lead vocals, backing vocals, acoustic guitar (1, 3, 4, 6, 7), high-string guitar (5)
- Paweł Rosak – keyboards, bass programming (1, 2, 4, 6, 12), drum programming, percussion programming (1–4, 8, 10), brass programming (6, 10)
- Hugh Burns – electric guitars (1, 5, 8, 11), guitars (2, 6, 12), lead guitar (4, 9), rhythm guitar (4), electric rhythm guitar (10)
- B.J. Cole – pedal steel guitar (1, 3)
- Bryn Haworth – bottleneck guitar (3, 7, 8, 10), mandolin (7)
- Jerry Donahue – electric guitar (10)
- Mo Foster – bass guitar (3, 5, 7–12), fretless bass (6)
- Arran Ahmun – cymbal, hi-hat, tambourine, tom drum (1, 4, 11), congas (1), talking drum (1), shaker (1, 7), cowbell (1, 2), agogôs (1), finger cymbals (1), castanets (2), brushes (7)
- Mel Collins – baritone saxophone (1, 8, 10, 12), soprano saxophone (2)
- Andrew Pryce Jackman – string arrangements (5, 9, 11, 12), bassoon arrangements (5), horn and oboe arrangements (9), brass and cor anglais arrangements (11)
- Gavyn Wright – string leader (5, 9, 11, 12)
- Liane Carroll – backing vocals (1–5, 7)
- Joe Egan – backing vocals (1–5, 7, 8, 10)
- Melanie Harrold – backing vocals (1–5, 7)
- Julian Littman – backing vocals (1–5, 7, 8, 10)
- Nicky Moore – backing vocals (1–5, 7, 8, 10)
- Jim Rafferty – backing vocals (4, 7)

== Production ==
- Gerry Rafferty – producer
- Hugh Murphy – producer, recording, engineer
- Barry Hammond – engineer
- Doug Cook – assistant engineer
- Mike Ross-Trevor – string recording
- Dan Priest – mixing
- Jim Rafferty – sleeve design, artwork
- Chris McHugo – cover photography
- SRS Typesetting – typography
