= Life Goes On (Gerry Rafferty album) =

Studio album by Gerry Rafferty
- Released: 30 November 2009
- Genre: Soft rock
- Length: 77:19
- Label: Hypertension Music
- Producers: Hugh Murphy; Gerry Rafferty

Gerry Rafferty chronology
Another World (2000)	Life Goes On (2009)	Rest in Blue (2021)

Life Goes On is the tenth studio album from Scottish soft rock musician Gerry Rafferty. Released on 30 November 2009 by Hypertension Music, it was the singer's final recording published before his 2011 death.

== Reception ==
Writing for Is this music?, Gary Marshall gave the album a three out of five, praising the singer's voice and some select tracks but noting that the album is over-produced and clearly made up of leftovers from previous albums.

== Track listing ==
All songs written by Gerry Rafferty, except where noted.

1. "Kyrie Eleison" (Wolfgang Amadeus Mozart) – 3:50
2. "The Waters of Forgetfulness" (New Edit) – 4:53
3. "Don't Speak of My Heart" (Gerry Rafferty, Jim Rafferty) – 5:58
4. "Because" (John Lennon, Paul McCartney) – 2:47
5. "Everytime I Wake Up" (New Edit) (Rafferty, with a reading from Rainer Maria Rilke) – 5:20
6. "Love and Affection" (New Edit) – 5:57
7. "The Land of the Chosen Few" (New Edit) – 4:00
8. "Life Goes On" (New Edit) – 3:06
9. "Another World" (New Edit) – 3:52
10. "Time's Caught Up On You" (New Edit) – 3:51
11. "Conscious Love" – 4:28
12. "Over My Head" – 2:50
13. "Hang On" – 4:02
14. "It's Easy to Talk" – 4:34
15. "The Maid of Culmore" (Traditional) – 4:08
16. "Your Heart's Desire" – 5:51
17. "Adeste Fidelis" (Traditional) – 4:08
18. "Silent Night" – 3:30

== Personnel ==
"Kyrie Eleison"

- Andy Patterson – bells, programming, engineering
- Gerry Rafferty – vocals, programming
- Giles Twigg – percussion, engineering

"The Waters of Forgetfulness"

- Arran Ahmun – drums, percussion
- Mel Collins – saxophone
- Doug Cook – engineering
- Brad Davis – engineering
- Brian Europe – assistant and vocal engineering
- Philippe Garcia – engineering
- Tom Gonzalez – vocal engineering
- Bryn Haworth – guitar
- Barry Hammond – drum engineering
- Jean Jacques Lemoine – engineering
- Hugh Murphy – engineering, recording, production
- Chris Potter – engineering
- Don Priest – engineering
- Gerry Rafferty – vocals, programming, production
- Pavel Rosak – keyboards, bass guitar, percussion, brass, marimba
- Tim Young – additional engineering

Recorded and engineered at Icon Studios, East Sussex, England, United Kingdom; with additional recording at Studio Miraval, France and Blue Wave Recording Studios, St. Philip, Barbados; and Parkgate Studios, Sussex, England, United Kingdom; drums recorded at Chipping Norton Studios, Oxfordshire, England, United Kingdom; mixed at The Hit Factory, London, England, United Kingdom; cut at Metropolis Mastering, London, England, United Kingdom

"Don't Speak of My Heart"

- Arran Ahmun – hi-hat, cymbal, tambourine
- Hugh Burns – electric guitar
- Lianne Carroll – backing vocals
- Doug Cook – assistant engineering
- Joe Egan – backing vocals
- Mo Foster – bass guitar
- Barry Hammond – additional engineering
- Melanie Harrold – backing vocals
- Andrew Jackman – bassoon and string arrangement
- Julian Littman – backing vocals
- Nicky Moore – backing vocals
- Hugh Murphy – production
- Dan Priest – mixing
- Gerry Rafferty – backing and lead vocals, high-string guitar, programming, production
- Pavel Rosak – keyboards, drum programming
- Mike Ross – string recording
- Gavyn Wright – strings

Recorded and engineered at Tye Farm, with additional recording at Chipping Norton Studios, strings recorded at The Hit Factory, mixed at Parkgate Studios.

"Because"

- Andy Patterson – engineering
- Gerry Rafferty – vocals, programming
- Giles Twigg – engineering

"Everytime I Wake Up"

- Arran Ahmun – percussion
- Kenny Craddock – Hammond organ, keyboards
- Brian Europe – assistant engineering
- Mo Foster – bass guitar
- Zahir Kahn – assistant engineering
- Gerry Rafferty – backing and lead vocals, electric guitar, programming
- Martin Raymond – assistant engineering
- Ronnie Rehse – German reading
- Arturo Tappin – saxophone
- Giles Twigg – drums, percussion, guitar, reading from Digital Delirium, programming, engineering

"Love and Affection"

- Arran Ahmun – hi-hat, cymbal, tambourine
- Hugh Burns – electric guitar
- Doug Cook – assistant engineering
- Mo Foster – bass guitar
- Barry Hammond – additional engineering
- Andrew Jackman – horn, oboe, and string arrangement
- Hugh Murphy – production
- Andy Patterson – engineering
- Dan Priest – mixing
- Gerry Rafferty – backing and lead vocals, programming, production
- Pavel Rosak – keyboards, drum programming
- Mike Ross – string recording
- Giles Twigg – engineering
- Gavyn Wright – strings

Recorded and engineered at Tye Farm, with additional recording at Chipping Norton Studios, strings recorded at The Hit Factory, mixed at Parkgate Studios.

"The Land of the Chosen Few"

- Gerry Rafferty – backing and lead vocals, acoustic guitar, programming
- Giles Twigg – drums, percussion, programming, engineering

Backing tracks recorded and completed at Icon Studios. Bagpipes, German monologue, and some of Gerry Rafferty's backing vocals and acoustic guitars recorded at Skibo Castle, Dornoch, Sutherland, Scotland, United Kingdom. Final mixes completed at Icon Studios in October 2000.

"Life Goes On"

- Arran Ahmun – hi-hat, cymbal, tambourine
- Hugh Burns – guitar
- Mel Collins – saxophone
- Doug Cook – assistant engineering
- Mo Foster – bass guitar
- Barry Hammond – additional engineering
- Andrew Jackman – string arrangement
- Hugh Murphy – production
- Andy Patterson – engineering
- Dan Priest – mixing
- Pavel Rosak – keyboards, bass guitar and drum programming
- Gerry Rafferty – backing and lead vocals, programming, production
- Mike Ross – string recording
- Giles Twigg – engineering
- Gavyn Wright – strings

Recorded and engineered at Tye Farm, with additional recording at Chipping Norton Studios, strings recorded at The Hit Factory, mixed at Parkgate Studios.

"Another World"

- Doug Cook – assistant engineering
- Kenny Craddock – Hammond organ, keyboards
- Brian Europe – assistant engineering
- Zahir Khan – assistant engineering
- Pino Palladino – bass guitar
- Martin Raymond – assistant engineering
- Gerry Rafferty – backing and lead vocals, electric piano, programming
- Giles Twigg – bass guitar and drum programming, engineering

Recorded and engineered at Tye Farm, with additional recording at Chipping Norton Studios, strings recorded at The Hit Factory, mixed at Parkgate Studios. Backing track recorded at Blue Wave Recording Studios, completed at Icon Studios.

"Time's Caught Up On You"

- Arran Ahmun – hi-hat, cymbal, tambouring, toms, cowbell, congas, talking drum, agogô, finger cymbals
- Hugh Burns – guitar
- Lianne Carroll – backing vocals
- B. J. Cole – pedal steel guitar
- Mel Collins – saxophone
- Doug Cook – assistant engineering
- Joe Egan – backing vocals
- Barry Hammond – additional engineering
- Melanie Harrold – backing vocals
- Julian Littman – backing vocals
- Nicky Moore – backing vocals
- Hugh Murphy – production
- Dan Priest – mixing
- Pavel Rosak – keyboards; bass guitar, drum, and percussion programming
- Mike Ross – string recording
- Gerry Rafferty – backing and lead vocals, acoustic guitar, programming, production
- Gavyn Wright – strings

"Conscious Love"

- Arran Ahmun – percussion
- Kenny Craddock – Hammond organ, keyboards
- Brian Europe – assistant engineering
- Karen Griffiths – backing vocals
- Bryn Haworth – slide guitar
- Zahir Kahn – assistant engineering
- Mark Knopfler – electric guitar
- Cindy Legall – backing vocals
- Tamara Marshall – backing vocals
- Pino Palladino – bass guitar
- Gerry Rafferty – backing and lead vocals, electric piano, programming, production
- Martin Raymond – assistant engineering
- Giles Twigg – drum and percussion programming, engineering

Backing track recorded at Blue Wave Recording Studios, completed at Icon Studios.

"Over My Head"

- Arran Ahmun – drums
- Doug Cook – additional engineering
- Brad Davis – additional engineering
- Brian Europe – assistant vocal engineering
- Mo Foster – bass guitar
- Philippe Garcia – assistant engineering
- Tom Gonzalez – vocal engineering
- Barry Hammond – drum engineering
- Jean Jacques Lemoine – engineering
- Ian Lynn – keyboards, strings
- Hugh Murphy – engineering, recording, production
- Andy Patterson – engineering
- Chris Potter – additional and assistant engineering
- Dan Priest – additional engineering
- Gerry Rafferty – acoustic guitar, vocals, production
- Tim Young – additional engineering

Recorded and engineered at Icon Studios, East Sussex, England, United Kingdom; with additional recording at Studio Miraval, France and Blue Wave Recording Studios, St. Philip, Barbados; and Parkgate Studios, Sussex, England, United Kingdom; drums recorded at Chipping Norton Studios, Oxfordshire, England, United Kingdom; mixed at The Hit Factory, London, England, United Kingdom; cut at Metropolis Mastering, London, England, United Kingdom

"Hang On"

- Arran Ahmun – hi-hat, cymbal, tambouring
- Mel Collins – saxophone
- Doug Cook – assistant engineering
- Joe Egan – backing vocals
- Mo Foster – bass guitar
- Bryn Haworth – bottleneck guitar
- Barry Hammond – additional engineering
- Julian Littman – backing vocals
- Nicky Moore – backing vocals
- Hugh Murphy – production
- Andy Patterson – engineering
- Dan Priest – mixing
- Gerry Rafferty – backing and lead vocals, programming, production
- Mike Ross – string recording
- Pavel Rosak – keyboards, drum and percussion programming
- Gavyn Wright – strings

Recorded and engineered at Tye Farm, with additional recording at Chipping Norton Studios, strings recorded at The Hit Factory, mixed at Parkgate Studios.

"It's Easy to Talk"

- Arran Ahmun – hi-hat, cymbal, tambourine
- Lianne Carroll – backing vocals
- B.J. Cole – pedal steel guitar
- Doug Cook – assistant engineering
- Joe Egan – backing vocals
- Mo Foster – bass guitar
- Barry Hammond – additional engineering
- Melanie Harrold – backing vocals
- Bryn Haworth – bottleneck guitar
- Julian Littman – backing vocals
- Nicky Moore – backing vocals
- Hugh Murphy – production
- Andy Patterson – engineering
- Dan Priest – additional engineering
- Gerry Rafferty – backing and lead vocals, acoustic guitar, programming, production
- Pavel Rosak – keyboards, drum and percussion programming
- Mike Ross – string recording
- Gavyn Wright – strings

Recorded and engineered at Tye Farm, with additional recording at Chipping Norton Studios, strings recorded at The Hit Factory, mixed at Parkgate Studios.

"The Maid of Culmore"

- Andy Patterson – engineering
- Gerry Rafferty – back and lead vocals, programming
- Giles Twigg – engineering

"Your Heart's Desire"

- Arran Ahmun – drums and percussion
- Alan Clark – Hammond organ, keyboards, synthesizer
- Mel Collins – saxophone
- Kenny Craddock – Hammond organ, keyboards, synthesizer
- Jerry Donahue – electric rhythm guitar
- Mo Foster – fretless bass guitar
- Gerry Rafferty – harmony and lead vocals, organ, synthesizer, acoustic guitar, piano, programming
- Andy Patterson – engineering
- Giles Twigg – engineering

"Adeste Fidelis"

- Andy Patterson – bells, engineering
- Gerry Rafferty – vocals, programming
- Giles Twigg – engineering

"Silent Night"

- Andy Patterson – engineering
- Gerry Rafferty – vocals and programming
- Giles Twigg – engineering
