= 221B Baker Street (disambiguation) =

221B Baker Street is the fictional residence of Sherlock Holmes.

221B Baker Street may also refer to:

- 221B Baker Street (board game), a 1975 board game about Sherlock Holmes
- 221B Baker Street (video game), a 1987 computer video game about Sherlock Holmes
- "221B Baker Street", the first episode of the 2013 Russian TV series Sherlock Holmes

== See also ==
- Baker Street (disambiguation)
