= Right Down the Line =

1978 song performed by Gerry Rafferty

Single by Gerry Rafferty

from the album City to City
- B-side: "Waiting for the Day"
- Released: 27 July 1978 (US); 22 September 1978 (UK)
- Recorded: 1977, Chipping Norton Recording Studios, Oxfordshire, England
- Genre: Soft rock
- Length: 4:28 (album version); 3:33 (single version)
- Label: United Artists
- Songwriter: Gerry Rafferty
- Producers: Hugh Murphy, Gerry Rafferty

Gerry Rafferty singles chronology
"Baker Street" (1978)	"Right Down the Line" (1978)	"Home and Dry" (1978)

"Right Down the Line" is a song written and recorded by Scottish singer-songwriter Gerry Rafferty. Released as a single in the US in July 1978, it was the follow-up to his first major hit as a solo artist, "Baker Street", and reached No. 12 on the US Billboard Hot 100, No. 8 on Cash Box and No. 1 on the Adult Contemporary charts.

In Canada, the song reached No. 5 on both the Pop singles and Adult Contemporary charts.

== Personnel ==
- Gerry Rafferty – vocals and rhythm guitar
- Hugh Burns – lead guitar
- Tommy Eyre – organ and piano
- Gary Taylor – bass
- BJ Cole – steel guitar
- Henry Spinetti – drums
- Glen Le Fleur – tambourine and clave

== Charts ==
=== Weekly charts ===
Chart (1978)	Peak position
Argentina	3
Australia (KMR)	93
Canada Top Singles (RPM)	5
Canada Adult Contemporary (RPM)	5
New Zealand (Recorded Music NZ)	33
South Africa (Springbok Radio)	17
US Billboard Hot 100	12
US Billboard Adult Contemporary	1
US Cash Box Top 100	8
US Record World	9

Chart (2022)	Peak position
US Hot Rock & Alternative Songs (Billboard)	16

=== Year-end charts ===
Chart (1978)	Rank
Canada	71
US (Joel Whitburn's Pop Annual)	91
US Cash Box	57
US Opus	92

== Certifications ==
Region	Certification	Certified units/sales
New Zealand (RMNZ)	2× Platinum	60,000^{‡}
United Kingdom (BPI) Sales since 2005	Gold	400,000^{‡}
^{‡} Sales+streaming figures based on certification alone.

== Cover versions ==
- Bonnie Raitt covered the song in 2012, including it in her Slipstream album. The track reached No. 17 on the US Adult Alternative Songs chart.
- Lucius covered the song in 2018, including it in their Nudes album.
