= Rest in Blue =

Studio album by Gerry Rafferty
- Released: September 3, 2021
- Genres: Soft rock, folk rock, blues rock
- Length: 63:24
- Label: Metanoia Music/Parlophone
- Producers: Martha Rafferty; Rudy Tambala

Gerry Rafferty chronology
Life Goes On (2009)	Rest in Blue (2021)

Rest in Blue is a 2021 album from Scottish soft rock musician Gerry Rafferty, compiled from recordings made shortly before his death.

== Recording ==
“The vocal was so outstanding, he loved traditional music and sang it so well. I wanted it to sound the way I remember him which was around the table singing with some of his friends or with family.”

— Martha Rafferty on emphasizing the vocals on her father's cover of "Dirty Old Town" for Rest in Blue.

Rafferty began work on an album in 2006, alongside 2009's Life Goes On, but did not complete it prior to his 2011 death. His daughter Martha took the recordings her father made and combined them with some demos going back to the 1970s to compile this release. The younger Rafferty chose to complete this album as a tribute to her father and emphasized traditional music for this collection, while also including a majority of the tracks the elder Rafferty intended for his follow-up album.

== Reception ==
David Quantick of Louder Sound scored this album 4 out of 5 stars, calling it "a wide-ranging final chapter two" and "a suitable memorial to a much-missed talent". Another 4 out of 5 stars came from James McNair of Mojo, writing that "Rafferty sounds better than ever" with his clear vocals on this recording, in contrast to more overproduced recordings in his lifetime. The Scotsman's Fiona Shepherd again gave 4 out of 5 stars to Rest in Blue, stating that it is "no dusty relic, rather it is a timeless treasure which confirms there was much more left in the tank, from symphonic pop to country gospel". In Uncut, Mark Beaumont gave this work a 7 out of 10 for being "a revelation" and "evidence that his melodic powers were undiminished even as he down-spiralled into tormented addiction".

== Track listing ==
All songs written by Gerry Rafferty, except where noted.

1. "Still in Denial" – 3:02
2. "Full Moon" – 5:26
3. "Sign of the Times" – 3:31
4. "You Are All I Want" – 4:44
5. "I Still Love You" – 4:07
6. "Wild Mountain Thyme" (Francis McPeake) – 4:51
7. "Slow Down" – 4:53
8. "It’s Just the Motion" (Richard Thompson) – 5:47
9. "Look at Me Now" – 5:20
10. "Dirty Old Town" (Ewan MacColl) – 5:35
11. "Lost Highway" – 4:38
12. "Keeper of My Soul" – 4:00
13. "Precious Memories" – 3:56
14. "Stuck in the Middle with You" (Joe Egan and Rafferty) – 3:36

== Personnel ==
- Gerry Rafferty – vocals, backing vocals, guitar, percussion

Additional musicians

- Frank Bogie – guitar
- Richard Brunton – guitar
- Scott Bryant – violin
- Hugh Burns – guitar, arrangement
- Alan Clark – Hammond organ, piano
- Kenny Craddock – keyboards, Hammond organ
- Nico Ersfeld – viola
- Tommy Eyre – piano
- Mo Foster – bass guitar
- Liam Genockey – drums
- John Giblin – bass guitar
- Bryn Haworth – guitar, slide guitar
- Katie Kissoon – vocals, backing vocals
- Rebekah Lesan – cello
- John Logan – string arrangement
- Kirsty Main – violin
- Colin McKee – violin
- Rab Noakes – backing vocals
- Samuel Omalyev – viola
- Andy Patterson – bass guitar, claps, tenor guitar, mandolin, percussion, vocals, bass programming, percussion programming, engineering, mixing
- Daniel Pioro – violin, band leader
- Graham Preskett – piano
- Mark Pusey – drums, percussion
- Mark Rafferty – harmonica
- Martha Rafferty – percussion, arrangement, production
- Paweł Rosak – piano
- Cameron Smith – cello
- Maria Turowska – violin
- Abigail Young – violin

Technical personnel

- John Byrne – artwork
- John Cavannah – engineering
- Neil Costello – engineering
- Oscar Dash – engineering assistance
- Roy Dodds – engineering
- Billy Foster – engineering assistance
- Barry Hammond – engineering
- George Oulton – mixing assistance
- Dan Priest – engineering
- Miles Showell – mastering
- Seb Stone – engineering
- Rudy Tambala – percussion programming, mixing, production
- Bob Whitney – engineering

== Chart performance ==
Rest in Blue peaked at 63 on the Swiss Hitparade chart and at 73 on the UK Albums Chart.

== See also ==
- 2021 in British music
- 2021 in rock music
- List of 2021 albums
