= Over My Head (album) =

Studio album by Gerry Rafferty
- Released: 1994
- Recorded: 1993–1994
- Studio: Tye Farm, Hartfield, East Sussex
- Genre: Rock, pop
- Length: 50:39
- Label: Polydor
- Producer: Gerry Rafferty, Hugh Murphy

Gerry Rafferty chronology
On a Wing and a Prayer (1992)	Over My Head (1994)	Baker Street (1998)

Over My Head is the eighth studio album by Gerry Rafferty, released in 1994. It is the follow-up to his album On a Wing and a Prayer and features many of the same musicians. The album includes songwriting contributions from Joe Egan and a John Lennon cover. The album also includes Rafferty's version of "Lonesome Polecat" a mournful ballad from Seven Brides for Seven Brothers. The final track on the album is a reworking of a song written for The Humblebums.

This was the last album Hugh Murphy produced before his death in 1998.

== Track listing ==
All songs by Gerry Rafferty except where noted:

No.	Title	Writer(s)	Length
1.	"Bajan Moon"		4:27
2.	"The Waters of Forgetfulness"		3:40
3.	"Down and Out"		5:49
4.	"Over My Head"		2:48
5.	"The Girl's Got No Confidence"		2:51
6.	"Wrong Thinking"	Joe Egan	3:54
7.	"Lonesome Polecat"	Gene de Paul, Johnny Mercer	5:25
8.	"Right or Wrong"	Joe Egan, Rafferty	4:20
9.	"Late Again"	Joe Egan, Rafferty	3:50
10.	"Clear Day"	Joe Egan, Rab Noakes, Rafferty	3:12
11.	"Out the Blue"	John Lennon	3:33
12.	"A New Beginning"		4:10
13.	"Her Father Didn't Like Me Anyway"		2:40

== Personnel ==
- Gerry Rafferty – acoustic guitar, vocals, backing vocals
- Arran Ahmun – drums, cymbal, percussion
- Bryn Haworth – rhythm guitar, mandolin, acoustic guitar, electric guitar
- Paweł Rosak – piano, keyboards, programming, bass guitar, harmonica, marimba
- Mo Foster, Pete Zorn – bass guitar
- Rab Noakes – acoustic guitar
- Mel Collins – tenor saxophone, baritone saxophone
- Ian Lynn – keyboards, synthesizer, string conductor
- Julian Dawson – harmonica
- Lianne Carroll – backing vocals
- Nicky Moore – backing vocals
- Brad Dawson – shaker
