= City to City =

Studio album by Gerry Rafferty
- Released: 20 January 1978
- Recorded: 1977
- Studio: Chipping Norton Recording Studios
- Genre: Rock
- Length: 51:12 (outside UK) 53:00 (UK)
- Label: United Artists
- Producers: Hugh Murphy, Gerry Rafferty

Gerry Rafferty chronology
| Gerry Rafferty (1974) | City to City (1978) | Night Owl (1979) |

Singles from City to City
- 1. "City to City" Released: September 1977; 2. "Baker Street" Released: February 1978; 3. "Whatever's Written in Your Heart" Released: June 1978 (UK); 4. "The Ark" Released: June 1978 (EU); 5. "Right Down the Line" Released: July 1978 (US); 6. "Home and Dry" Released: November 1978 (US)

Professional ratings
Review scores
| Source | Rating |
|---|---|
| AllMusic | 4.5/5 stars |
| Christgau's Record Guide | B− |
| The Encyclopedia of Popular Music | 5/5 stars |
| Rolling Stone | (very favorable) |

City to City is the second solo studio album by Scottish singer-songwriter Gerry Rafferty, released on 20 January 1978 by United Artists Records. It was Rafferty's first solo release in six years—and first release of any kind since 1975—due to his tenure in the band Stealers Wheel and subsequent legal proceedings which prevented Rafferty from releasing any new solo recordings for the next three years.

City to City displaced Saturday Night Fever at No. 1 on the US Billboard 200 album chart on 8 July 1978, and went platinum. The album reached No. 6 in the UK Albums Chart and achied gold status. In Canada, it was certified double-platinum in 1979. "Baker Street", "Right Down the Line" and "Home and Dry" were hits on the American charts.

== Hit singles ==
=== "Baker Street" ===
United Artists wanted to use "City to City" as the lead single from the album and it was released in late 1977 in the UK and a few European markets. However, Rafferty felt that "Baker Street" would be a better choice, and that song eventually became the first single from the album in most countries. Released on 3 February 1978, "Baker Street" peaked at No. 3 on the UK Singles Chart and spent four weeks at No. 1 in Canada. It spent six weeks at No. 2 on the US Billboard Hot 100, and two weeks at No. 1 on the US Cash Box Top 100. The B-side of "Baker Street" was "Big Change in the Weather".

=== "Right Down the Line" ===
"Right Down the Line" reached number 12 on the Billboard Hot 100, peaked for two weeks at number eight on the Cash Box Top 100, and spent four non-consecutive weeks at number one on the Easy Listening chart in the US in 1978. It is the only Rafferty song to reach number one on this chart. Bonnie Raitt covered the song on her 2012 album Slipstream.

=== "Home and Dry" ===
"Home and Dry" was the third single from the album in the United States, but did not have a UK release. It peaked at No. 28 on the Billboard Hot 100, giving Rafferty a third consecutive Top 40 hit on that chart. It reached No. 23 in Canada. The B-side featured the sixth track from City to City, "Mattie's Rag". It reached No. 26 on the U.S. Easy Listening chart, doing best on the Canadian Adult Contemporary chart, where it reached No. 7.

== Track listing ==
All tracks are written by Gerry Rafferty.

Side one
| No. | Title | Length |
|---|---|---|
| 1. | "The Ark" | 5:40 |
| 2. | "Baker Street" | 6:06 |
| 3. | "Right Down the Line" | 4:28 |
| 4. | "City to City" | 5:03 |
| 5. | "Stealin' Time" | 5:59 |

Side two
| No. | Title | Length |
|---|---|---|
| 1. | "Mattie's Rag" | 3:28 |
| 2. | "Whatever's Written in Your Heart" | 6:38 |
| 3. | "Home and Dry" | 4:57 |
| 4. | "Island" | 5:17 |
| 5. | "Waiting for the Day" | 5:46 |

== Personnel ==
- Gerry Rafferty – Lead Vocals, Backing Vocals (3–10), Acoustic Guitar (1, 4, 5), Acoustic Piano (10)
- Tommy Eyre – Acoustic Piano (1–3, 5–8), Synthesizers (2, 5, 7, 8), Organ (3, 9, 10), Electric Piano (2, 5, 9, 10), Brass Arrangements (10)
- Willy Ray – Accordion (6, 9)
- Jerry Donahue – Electric Guitar (1)
- Hugh Burns – Rhythm & Lead Guitars (2–4, 5, 8, 9, 10)
- Nigel Jenkins – Rhythm Guitar (2), Lead Guitar (8)
- Micky Moody – Acoustic Guitar (5)
- Andy Fairweather-Low – Rhythm Guitar (10)
- B.J. Cole – Steel Guitar (3–5, 9), Dobro (6)
- Gary Taylor – bass and backing vocals (1–10)
- Henry Spinetti – Drums (1–6, 8, 10)
- Graham Preskett – Fiddle (1, 4, 6, 10), Mandolin (1), String Arrangements (2, 8), ARP String synthesizer (5, 6). Brass arrangements (6)
- Glen LeFleur – Tambourine (1, 3, 5), Clave (3), Congas (2, 10), Drums (9)
- Hugh Murphy – Tambourine (4)
- Raphael Ravenscroft – Saxophones (2, 9)
- Paul Jones – Harmonica (4)
- Barbara Dickson – Backing Vocals (1, 7)
- Roger Brown – Backing Vocals (4)
- Vivienne McAuliffe – Backing Vocals (4)
- John McBurnie – Backing Vocals (4)
- Rab Noakes – Backing Vocals (4)
- Joanna Carlin – Backing Vocals (7)

Australian bush band the Bushwackers featured on track 1 "The Ark", playing the introductory piece on fiddle, concertina, and bodhran. This piece was also used under the guitar solo in the middle of the song. Their fee was £25 for the session and they were never paid. The Bushwackers line-up at this time included the late Louis McManus Jnr (fiddle, guitar and mandolin) who had been born in Rafferty's hometown of Paisley.

== Production ==
- Gerry Rafferty – producer
- Hugh Murphy – producer
- Barry Hammond – recording
- Declan O'Doherty – mixing
- John Patrick Byrne – cover painting
- Additional recording at Berwick Street Studios and Marquee Studios (London, England).
- Mixed at Advision Studios (London, England).

== Charts ==
=== Weekly charts ===
| Chart (1978) | Peak position |
|---|---|
| Australia Albums (Kent Music Report) | 3 |
| Austrian Albums (Ö3 Austria) | 9 |
| Canada Top Albums/CDs (RPM) | 1 |
| Dutch Albums (Album Top 100) | 5 |
| German Albums (Offizielle Top 100) | 3 |
| New Zealand Albums (RMNZ) | 6 |
| Swedish Albums (Sverigetopplistan) | 9 |
| UK Albums (Official Charts) | 6 |
| US Billboard 200 | 1 |

=== Year-end charts ===
| Chart (1978) | Position |
|---|---|
| Australia Albums (Kent Music Report) | 8 |
| Canada Top Albums/CDs (RPM) | 18 |
| Dutch Albums (Album Top 100) | 3 |
| German Albums (Offizielle Top 100) | 14 |
| New Zealand Albums (RMNZ) | 14 |
| US Billboard 200 | 38 |

== Sales and certifications ==
Certifications for City to City
| Region | Certification | Certified units/sales |
|---|---|---|
| Australia (ARIA) | 2× Platinum | 100,000^{^} |
| Netherlands (NVPI) | Platinum | 100,000^{^} |
| United Kingdom (BPI) | Gold | 100,000^{^} |
| United States (RIAA) | Platinum | 1,000,000^{^} |
^{^} Shipments figures based on certification alone.
