= Local Hero (soundtrack) =

Soundtrack album by Mark Knopfler
- Released: April 1983
- Recorded: 1982
- Studios: Power Station, New York City; Eden, London
- Genres: Celtic music, instrumental rock, jazz, folk, Progressive music, Roots rock, ambient
- Length: 43:48
- Labels: Vertigo; Warner Bros. (USA)
- Producer: Mark Knopfler

Mark Knopfler chronology
Local Hero (1983)	Cal (1984)

Local Hero is the debut soundtrack album by British singer-songwriter and guitarist Mark Knopfler, released in April 1983 by Vertigo Records internationally and by Warner Bros. Records in the United States. It contains music composed for the 1983 film Local Hero, produced by David Puttnam and both written and directed by Bill Forsyth.

In 1984, the album received a BAFTA award nomination for Best Score for a Film. The final track of the album, "Going Home", is played before every home game of Newcastle United F.C. Knopfler re-recorded the song as a charity single for the 2014 Great North Run in his home city.

The album is essentially instrumental, although Gerry Rafferty provided vocals for the fifth track, "The Way It Always Starts". Both "Going Home" and "Wild Theme" have been played as the final songs of every Dire Straits concert, "Going Home" was performed live from 1982 to 1985, as well as an Italian concert in late 1992, and "Wild Theme" was performed for the majority of the On Every Street Tour.

== Background ==
Following a string of three multi-platinum albums with Dire Straits—Dire Straits (1978), Communiqué (1979), and Making Movies (1980)—Knopfler, the group's lead singer, guitarist, songwriter, and producer, began to look for new musical challenges and opportunities. In early 1982, his manager wrote to several film directors indicating that Knopfler was interested in writing film music. Producer David Puttnam responded, and after reviewing the Local Hero project, Knopfler accepted the job. Following the completion of Dire Straits' fourth album, Love Over Gold, recorded from 8 March to 11 June 1982, Knopfler began work on the film's music. He invited Gerry Rafferty to be the lead vocalist on the song, "The Way It Always Starts". In 2000, Rafferty invited Knopfler to provide rhythm guitar and lead fills on what would be his final studio album, Another World.

== Recording and re-recording ==
The Local Hero album was recorded in 1982 at The Power Station in New York, and Eden Studios in London. The Ceilidh scenes were recorded at Hilton Women's Royal Institute Hall near Banff, Scotland on 19 June 1982.

In March 2024, Knopfler re-recorded the theme with fellow guitarists including Bruce Springsteen, Brian May and Jeff Beck, with the group credited as 'Mark Knopfler's Guitar Heroes', in aid of Teenage Cancer Trust. The track peaked at #18 on the UK singles chart.

== Critical reception ==
Professional ratings
Review scores
Source	Rating
AllMusic	4.5/5 stars
Rolling Stone	4/5 stars

In his retrospective review for AllMusic, William Ruhlmann gave the album four and a half out of five stars, noting that Knopfler's "intricate, introspective finger-picked guitar stylings make a perfect musical complement to the wistful tone of Bill Forsyth's comedy film." Ruhlmann continued, "The low-key music picks up traces of Scottish music, but most of it just sounds like Dire Straits doing instrumentals, especially the recurring theme, one of Knopfler's more memorable melodies."

Rolling Stone magazine's contemporary review called Knopfler's film music debut an "insinuating LP of charming, cosmopolitan soundtrack music—a record that can make movies in your mind."

For the Local Hero soundtrack, Knopfler received a BAFTA award nomination for Best Score for a Film.

"Going Home" is played at Newcastle United F.C. and Aberdeen F.C. home games as the football players run out onto the pitch, as well as at the end of games at other clubs such as Burton Albion F.C. and Tranmere Rovers F.C.

== Track listing ==
All music and lyrics were written by Mark Knopfler, except where indicated.

No.	Title	Length
1.	"The Rocks and the Water"	3:30
2.	"Wild Theme"	3:38
3.	"Freeway Flyer"	1:47
4.	"Boomtown (variation Louis' Favourite)"	4:06
5.	"The Way It Always Starts" (Featuring Gerry Rafferty)	4:00
6.	"The Rocks and the Thunder"	0:45
7.	"The Ceilidh and the Northern Lights"	3:57
8.	"The Mist Covered Mountains" (Traditional, arrangement by Mark Knopfler)	5:13
9.	"The Ceilidh: Louis' Favourite, Billy's Tune"	3:57
10.	"Whistle Theme"	0:51
11.	"Smooching"	4:58
12.	"Stargazer"	1:31
13.	"The Rocks and the Thunder"	0:40
14.	"Going Home: Theme of the Local Hero"	5:01
Total length:		43:48

== Personnel ==
Music

- Mark Knopfler – guitars, synthesizers, percussion, LinnDrum
- Alan Clark – synthesizers, piano, Hammond organ
- Hal Lindes – rhythm guitar (3)
- Michael Brecker – saxophone (4,11,14)
- Mike Mainieri – vibes (4,11)
- Gerry Rafferty – vocals (5)
- Neil Jason – bass (4,5)
- Tony Levin – bass (11,14)
- John Illsley – bass (3)
- Eddie Gomez – bass (8)
- Steve Jordan – drums (4,5)
- Terry Williams – drums (3)
- The Acetones (Note: The Acetones are a group that perform in the Ceilidh scenes in the film Local Hero. The Acetones are Alan Clark (piano), Alan Darby (guitar), Roddy Murray (guitar), Jimmy Yuill (whistle), Mark Winchester (violin), Dale Winchester (accordion), Brian Rowan (bass), and Ed Bicknell (drums).)

Production

- Mark Knopfler – producer
- Neil Dorfsman – engineer
- Josh Abbey – assistant engineer
- Tim Palmer – assistant engineer
- Phil Vinall – assistant engineer
- Bob Ludwig – mastering at Masterdisk
- Denis Waugh – cover photo
- Frank Griffin – back cover photo

== Charts ==
=== Weekly charts ===
Chart (1983)	Peak position
Australia Albums (Kent Music Report)	12
Dutch Albums (Album Top 100)	21
New Zealand Albums (RMNZ)	38
UK Albums (Official Charts)	14

=== Year-end charts ===
Chart (1983)	Position
Dutch Albums (Album Top 100)	100

== Certifications ==
Organisation	Level	Date
BPI – UK	Silver	17 May 1984
