= Can I Have My Money Back? =

Studio album by Gerry Rafferty
- Released: 1971; 1973 (US)
- Recorded: London, Morgan Studios
- Genres: Rock, folk rock
- Length: 40:23
- Labels: Transatlantic; Blue Thumb (US)
- Producer: Hugh Murphy

Gerry Rafferty chronology
Can I Have My Money Back? (1971)	Gerry Rafferty (1974)

Singles from Can I Have My Money Back
- 1. "Can I Have My Money Back?" b/w "So Bad Thinking" Released: 1971

Professional ratings
Review scores
Source	Rating
AllMusic	4/5 stars

Can I Have My Money Back? is the debut solo album by Gerry Rafferty. The distinctive cover design was by John Patrick Byrne and was the start of a long working relationship between Rafferty and the playwright. The LP was well received, but performed poorly in charts and sales, in part because Rafferty had just left a well known band, The Humblebums. The album also saw Joe Egan come on board, and the pair formed Stealers Wheel shortly afterwards.

To capitalize on Rafferty's success with Stealers Wheel, the album received its first US release in 1973 on Blue Thumb Records. Following his subsequent solo success with "Baker Street", the label (then a subsidiary of ABC) reissued the album in 1978.

The album was re-issued in the UK in 2000 on CD (subtitled "The Best of Gerry Rafferty") with a different cover design (Castle Music, Ltd; Cat. No. ESMCD-879). It featured an additional twelve Humblebums tracks. This was later released in the US in 2002 on CD, and in partnership with Silverline Records, DVD-Audio with a 5.1-channel 96 kHz/24bit MLP surround mix by Rich Fowler.

== Track listing ==
All tracks composed and arranged by Gerry Rafferty; except where indicated

1. "New Street Blues"
2. "Didn't I?"
3. "Mr. Universe"
4. "Mary Skeffington"
5. "The Long Way Round"
6. "Can I Have My Money Back?"
7. "Sign on the Dotted Line" (Rafferty, Joe Egan)
8. "Make You, Break You"
9. "To Each and Everyone"
10. "One Drink Down" (Rafferty, John Byrne)
11. "Don't Count Me Out"
12. "Half a Chance"
13. "Where I Belong"

Singles: "Can I Have My Money Back?" b/w "So Bad Thinking" (Transatlantic: BIG 139) "Make You, Break You" (mono) b/w "Make You, Break You" (stereo) (Signpost: SP-70001; USA) "Didn't I" b/w "Can I Have My Money Back?" (Big T: BIG 139) "Mr Universe" b/w "Can I Have My Money Back?" (Transatlantic: M 25.565)

Note: CD releases include a different performance of "Mary Skeffington" from that which appears on the original vinyl LP; the latter has a relatively sparer arrangement, emphasising acoustic guitar, and was later released by Rab Noakes (who contributed to several tracks on Can I Have My Money Back) on his Demos and Rarities Vol. 2 - Adventures with Gerry Rafferty collection.

Castle Music, Ltd. (UK, 2000) (CD) Expanded Reissue Bonus Tracks:
All tracks recorded and previously released by The Humblebums. (Length: 79:29)

14. "Look Over the Hill and Far Away"
15. "Patrick"
16. "Rick Rack"
17. "Her Father Didn't Like Me Anyway"
18. "Please Sing a Song for Us"
19. "Blood and Glory"
20. "I Can't Stop Now"
21. "All the Best People Do It"
22. "Steamboat Row"
23. "Shoeshine Boy"
24. "Keep It to Yourself"
25. "My Singing Bird"

== Personnel ==
- Gerry Rafferty – lead vocals, piano, acoustic guitar, backing vocals
- Joe Egan – backing vocals
- Rab Noakes – acoustic guitar, backing vocals
- Roger Brown – electric guitar, backing vocals
- Zed Jenkins, Alan Parker – electric guitar
- Gary Taylor – bass, backing vocals
- Rod King – steel guitar
- Hugh Murphy – tambourine, backing vocals
- Tom Parker – Hammond organ, harmonium, harpsichord
- Tom Lasker – piano
- Henry Spinetti, Andy Steele – drums
- Johnny Van Derrick – fiddle, violin

Technical

- John Whitehead – production coordination
- John Patrick Byrne – cover artwork
