= North and South (album) =

Studio album by Gerry Rafferty
- Released: 9 May 1988
- Genre: Rock, Celtic rock
- Length: 55:41
- Label: London
- Producer: Gerry Rafferty, Hugh Murphy

Gerry Rafferty chronology
Sleepwalking (1982)	North and South (1988)	On a Wing and a Prayer (1992)

North and South is the sixth studio album by Gerry Rafferty. It was Rafferty's first studio album in six years and reunited him with producer Hugh Murphy. The album was released as an LP and CD in 1988. One of the singles was "Shipyard Town", also released on several compilation albums.

== Track listing ==
All tracks composed and arranged by Gerry Rafferty.

1. "North and South" – 6:45
2. "Moonlight and Gold" – 6:10
3. "Tired of Talking" – 4:09
4. "Hearts Run Dry" – 6:09
5. "A Dangerous Age" – 6:11
6. "Shipyard Town" – 6:12
7. "Winter’s Come" – 6:50
8. "Nothing Ever Happens Down Here" – 3:42
9. "On a Night Like This" – 6:09
10. "Unselfish Love" – 5:25

== Personnel ==
- Gerry Rafferty – vocals (1), keyboards (1, 3, 7, 8) acoustic guitar (1, 2, 4, 9), bass (1), lead and harmony vocals (2–10), electric piano (2), organ (2), string synthesizer (5), acoustic piano intro (9), electric rhythm guitar (10), saxophone (10)
- Alan Clark – keyboards (1, 3, 5, 6, 9, 10), synthesizers (2, 5), Hammond organ (5)
- Kenny Craddock – keyboards (3, 5–7, 9, 10), Hammond organ (4, 6), synthesizers (5)
- Geraint Watkins – accordion (3, 4, 8, 9)
- Betsy Cook – electric piano (4)
- Jerry Donahue – electric guitars (1, 4), electric guitar arpeggios (2, 7), electric guitar solo (2, 3, 5, 7, 9, 10), electric rhythm guitar (3, 5, 6, 8, 9), electric lead guitar (6, 8)
- Bryn Haworth – slide guitar (4)
- Mo Foster – bass (1), fretless bass (4)
- Pete Zorn – fretless bass (1), bass (8)
- Ian Maidman – bass (2–7, 9, 10)
- Arran Ahmun – drums, percussion
- Morris Pert – additional percussion (4)
- Ric Sanders – fiddles (1, 3, 5, 7, 8), fiddle intro (3)
- Mel Collins – saxophone (1, 5, 6)
- Andrew White – soprano saxophone intro (2)
- Davy Spillane – Uilleann pipes (1, 3, 5, 7), whistle (3, 5, 7)
- William Malone – string introduction piece (2), string arrangements (2)

== Production ==
- Hugh Murphy – producer, engineer
- Gerry Rafferty – producer
- Brad Davis – remixing (1–5, 7, 9, 10)
- Greg Jackman – remixing (6, 8)
- Bill Smith Studio – sleeve design
- World Travel – photography
- Gered Mankowitz – back cover photography

Studios

- Recorded at Gerry's home
- Additional recording at RAK Studios and Odyssey Studios (London, UK).
- Mixed at Comforts Place (Surrey, UK).
