= Another World (Gerry Rafferty album) =

Studio album by Gerry Rafferty
- Released: 2000
- Recorded: 2000
- Genre: Rock, pop
- Length: 69:52
- Label: Hypertension Music
- Producer: Gerry Rafferty

Gerry Rafferty chronology
Baker Street (1998)	Another World (2000)	Life Goes On (2009)

Professional ratings
Review scores
Source	Rating
AllMusic	2/5 stars

Another World is the ninth studio album by Gerry Rafferty. The album was released in 2000 on the Icon Music label. It was later re-released in 2003 on the Hypertension label with a slightly amended track order, and with "La Fenêtre" replaced by "Keep It To Yourself", the latter track also being released a single in Europe and the UK. Mark Knopfler of Dire Straits appears throughout the album, providing rhythm guitar and lead fills. The album was originally only available through Rafferty's website to download.

== Track listings ==
=== 2000 edition ===
All songs were written and arranged by Gerry Rafferty, except where noted.

1. "All Souls" – 5:20
2. "Land of the Chosen Few" – 5:13
3. "Sweet Surrender" – 4:02
4. "Sweet Love" – 4:27
5. "Whose House Is It Anyway?" (Rafferty, Julian Littman) – 4:31
6. "It's Better This Way" – 4:00
7. "Conscious Love" – 4:26
8. "La Fenêtre" – 3:17
9. "Everytime I Wake Up" – 5:52
10. "Xavier & Honor" – 3:10
11. "You Put Something Better Inside of Me" (Rafferty, Joe Egan) – 4:53
12. "Metanoia" – 3:24
13. "Children of the Sun" – 4:04
14. "Another World" – 10:40
  - Contains the hidden track "The Grinches"

=== 2003 edition ===
All songs were written and arranged by Gerry Rafferty, except where noted.

1. "All Souls" – 5:20
2. "Land of the Chosen Few" – 5:13
3. "Keep It To Yourself" – 5:42
4. "Sweet Love" – 4:27
5. "Whose House Is It Anyway?" (Rafferty, Julian Littman) – 4:31
6. "It's Better This Way" – 4:00
7. "Conscious Love" – 4:26
8. "Sweet Surrender" – 4:02
9. "Everytime I Wake Up" – 5:52
10. "Xavier & Honor" – 3:10
11. "You Put Something Better Inside of Me" (Rafferty, Joe Egan) – 4:53
12. "Metanoia" – 3:24
13. "Children of the Sun" – 4:04
14. "Another World" – 10:40
  - Contains the hidden track "The Grinches"

== Personnel ==
- Gerry Rafferty – vocals, acoustic guitar, synthesizer, bass guitar, keyboards, piano, Fender Rhodes
- Giles Twigg – drums, percussion, programming, bass guitar, effected guitar, engineer
- Mel Collins – saxophone
- Arran Ahmun, Dave Suttle – percussion
- Cindy Legall, Tamara Marshall, Karen Griffiths – backing vocals
- Bryn Haworth – electric guitar, slide guitar
- Julian Littman – electric guitar, accordion, backing vocals
- Kenny Craddock – keyboards, accordion, Hammond organ
- Bryn Haworth – slide guitar, mandolin
- Mark Knopfler – electric guitar, lead guitar
- Vic Linton – electric guitar
- Mo Foster, Pino Palladino – bass guitar
