= Gerry Rafferty =

Scottish singer-songwriter (1947–2011)

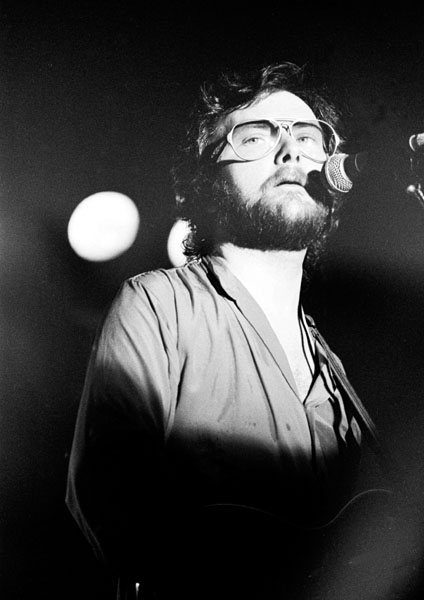
- Rafferty performing in 1980

Background information
- Born: Gerald Rafferty; 16 April 1947; Paisley, Renfrewshire, Scotland
- Died: 4 January 2011 (aged 63) Stroud, Gloucestershire, England
- Genres: Rock; pop rock; folk rock; soft rock; blues rock
- Occupations: Singer-songwriter, musician
- Instruments: Vocals; guitar; piano; bass guitar
- Years active: 1965–2011
- Labels: Transatlantic; United Artists; Liberty; London; Avalanche Records; Hypertension
- Formerly of: The Humblebums; Stealers Wheel

Gerald Rafferty (16 April 1947 – 4 January 2011) was a Scottish singer-songwriter. He was a founding member of Stealers Wheel, whose biggest hit was "Stuck in the Middle with You" in 1973. His solo hits in the late 1970s included "Baker Street", "Right Down the Line" and "Night Owl".

Rafferty was born into a working-class family in Paisley, Renfrewshire, Scotland. His mother taught him both Irish and Scottish folk songs when he was a boy; later, he was influenced by the music of the Beatles and Bob Dylan. He joined the folk-pop group the Humblebums (of which Billy Connolly was a member) in 1969. After they disbanded in 1971, he recorded his first solo album, Can I Have My Money Back? Rafferty and Joe Egan formed the group Stealers Wheel in 1972. In 1978, he recorded his second solo album, City to City. A heavy drinker for much of his life, Rafferty died from liver failure in January 2011.

== Early years ==
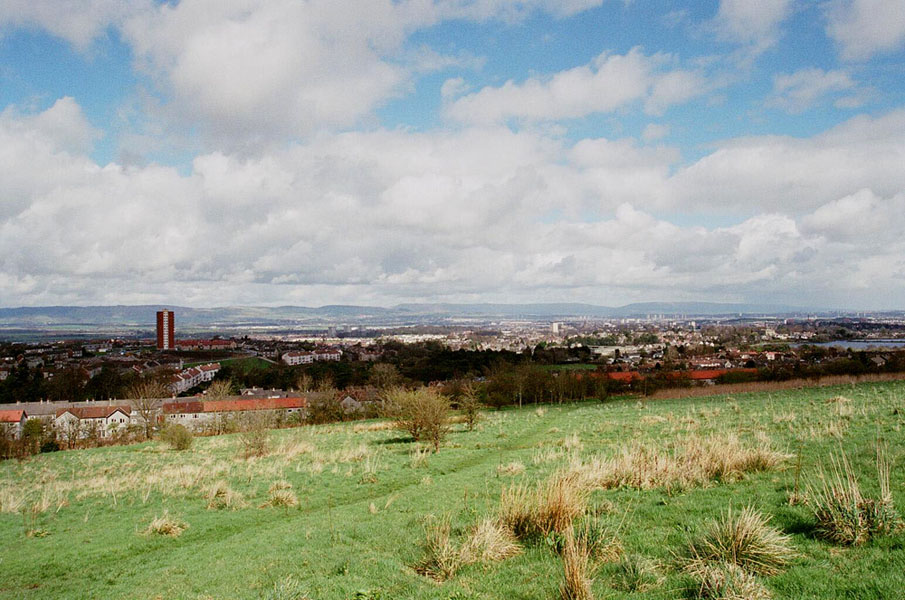
Foxbar in Paisley, Renfrewshire, where Rafferty grew up

Rafferty was born in 1947 into a working-class family of Irish Catholic origin in Underwood Lane in Paisley, a son and grandson of coal miners. His parents were Joseph Rafferty and Mary Skeffington, and he had two older brothers, Joe and Jim.

Rafferty grew up in a council house in the town's Ferguslie Park, in Underwood Lane, and was educated at St Mirin's Academy. His Irish-born father was a miner and lorry driver who died when Rafferty was 16. Rafferty learned both Irish and Scottish folk songs as a boy. He recalled: "My father was Irish, so growing up in Paisley I was hearing all these songs when I was two or three. Songs like 'She Moves Through the Fair', which my mother sings beautifully. And a whole suite of Irish traditional songs and Scots traditional songs". Heavily influenced by folk music and the music of the Beatles and Bob Dylan, Rafferty started to write his own material.

== Musical career ==
Rafferty left St Mirin's Academy in 1963. He then worked in a butcher's shop, as a civil service clerk, and in a shoe shop. However, as he explained in an interview, "there was never anything else for me but music. I never intended making a career out of any of the jobs I did." On weekends, he and a classmate, future Stealers Wheel collaborator Joe Egan, played in a local group named the Maverix. They mainly covered chart songs by groups such as the Beatles and the Rolling Stones. For a time in the mid 1960s, Rafferty earned money busking on the London Underground. In 1966, Rafferty and Egan were members of the band the Fifth Column, along with Dennis Bell. The group got a deal with Columbia Records and released the single "Benjamin Day"/"There's Nobody Here", but it was not a commercial success.

=== The Humblebums and Stealers Wheel ===
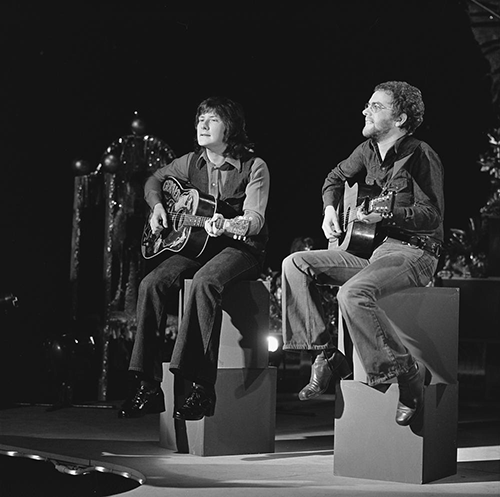
Rafferty (left) with Stealers Wheel on TopPop (1973) Dutch TV show

In 1969, Rafferty became the third member of a folk-pop group, the Humblebums, along with Tam Harvey and future comedian Billy Connolly. Harvey left shortly afterwards, and Rafferty and Connolly continued as a duo, recording two more albums for Transatlantic Records. A 1970 appearance at the Royal Festival Hall, supporting Fotheringay with Nick Drake, earned a positive review from critic Karl Dallas, who noted that all three acts showed "promise rather than fulfilment", and observed that "Gerry Rafferty's songs have the sweet tenderness of Paul McCartney in his 'Yesterday' mood". In his stand-up shows, Connolly often recalled this period, telling how Rafferty made him laugh and describing the crazy things they did while on tour. Once Rafferty decided to look in the Berlin telephone directory to see if any Hitlers were listed.

After the duo separated in 1971, Transatlantic owner Nathan Joseph signed Rafferty as a solo performer. Rafferty recorded his first solo album, Can I Have My Money Back?, with Hugh Murphy, a staff producer working for the label. Billboard praised the album as "high-grade folk-rock", describing it as Rafferty's "finest work" to date: "His tunes are rich and memorable with an undeniable charm that will definitely see him into the album and very possibly singles charts soon". Although the album was a critical success, it did not sell well. According to Rafferty's daughter Martha, it was around this time that her father discovered, by chance, Colin Wilson's The Outsider. A classic book about alienation and creativity, it became a huge influence both, Rafferty's songwriting and outlook on the world: "The ideas and references contained in that one book were to sustain and inspire him for the rest of his life," she recalled. Rafferty later confirmed that alienation was the "persistent theme" of his songs; "To Each and Everyone" from Can I Have My Money Back? was an early example.

In 1972, having gained some airplay from his Signpost recording "Make You, Break You", Rafferty joined Egan to form Stealers Wheel and recorded three albums with the American songwriters and producers Leiber & Stoller. The group was beset by legal wranglings, but had a huge hit with "Stuck in the Middle with You", which earned critical acclaim and commercial success. A 1975 article in Sounds described it as "a sort of cross between white label Beatles and punk Dylan yet with a unique Celtic flavour that has marked all their work". Twenty years later, the song was used prominently in the 1992 movie Reservoir Dogs even though Rafferty refused to grant permission for its re-release. Stealers Wheel also produced the lesser top 50 hits "Everyone's Agreed That Everything Will Turn Out Fine" and "Star". There were also further suggestions of Rafferty's growing alienation in tracks such as "Outside Looking In" and "Who Cares". The duo disbanded in 1975.

=== City to City and Night Owl ===
Legal issues following the break-up of Stealers Wheel prevented Rafferty from releasing any material for three years. After the disputes were resolved in 1978, he recorded his second solo album, City to City, with producer Hugh Murphy. The album included the song with which he remains most identified: "Baker Street". According to Murphy's 1993 interview with Billboard, he and Rafferty had to beg the record label, United Artists, to release "Baker Street" as a single. "They actually said it was too good for the public." The single reached #3 in the UK and #2 in the US, and won the 1979 Ivor Novello Award for Best Song Musically and Lyrically.

The album City to City sold over 5.5 million copies, knocking the Saturday Night Fever soundtrack from the top of the Billboard 200 album chart in the US on 8 July 1978. Rafferty considered this his first proper taste of success, as he told Melody Maker the following year: ". . . all the records I've ever done before have been flops. Stealers Wheel was a flop. 'Can I Have My Money Back?' was a flop. The Humblebums were a flop . . . My life doesn't stand or fall by the amount of people who buy my records."

"Baker Street" features a saxophone riff played by Raphael Ravenscroft, although the origins of the solo have been disputed. As the singer recalled in a 1988 interview with Colin Irwin:

When I wrote the song I saw that bit as an instrumental part but I didn't know what. We tried electric guitar but it sounded weak, and we tried other things and I think it was Hugh Murphy's suggestion that we tried saxophone.

In a 2006 interview with The Times, Ravenscroft said he was presented with a song that contained "several gaps":

If you're asking me: 'Did Gerry hand me a piece of music to play?' then no, he didn't. In fact, most of what I played was an old blues riff.

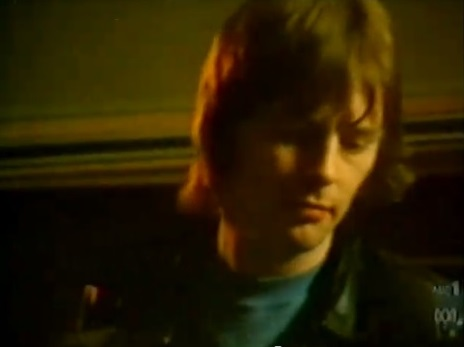
Hugh Murphy produced seven of Rafferty's solo albums.

In his interview with Colin Irwin, Rafferty disputed this and said that Ravenscroft had been his second choice to play the saxophone solo, after Pete Zorn, who was unavailable: "The only confusion at the time that I didn't enjoy too much was the fact that a lot of people believed that the line was written by Raphael Ravenscroft, the sax player, but it was my line. I sang it to him." When a remastered version of City to City was released in 2011, it included the original, electric guitar 'demo' version of the song as a bonus track, confirming Rafferty's authorship of the riff (which appears in the demo note-for-note, as an electric guitar solo). In the liner notes to the album, Rafferty's long-time friend and collaborator Rab Noakes commented:

Let's hope [the Baker Street demo] will, at last, silence all who keep on asserting that the saxophone player came up with the melody line. He didn't. He just blew what he was told by the person who did write it, Gerry Rafferty.

Michael Gray, Rafferty's former manager, agreed:

The audible proof is there from the demos that Rafferty himself created the riff and placed it within the song's structure exactly where it ended up.

"Baker Street" remains a mainstay of soft-rock radio airplay, and in October 2010 was recognised by the BMI for surpassing 5 million plays worldwide. "Stuck in the Middle With You" has received over 4 million plays worldwide, and "Right Down The Line" has had over 3 million plays. In a 2003 interview with The Sun (Scotland), Rafferty commented on how profitable his biggest song had been: "Baker Street still makes me about £80,000 a year. It's been a huge earner for me. I must admit, I could live off that song alone." Rafferty loathed the 1992 dance music cover version of "Baker Street" by Undercover, describing it as "dreadful, totally banal–it's a sad sign of the times". However it earned him another £1.5 million, selling around three million copies in Europe and America. He never let "Baker Street" be used for advertising, despite lucrative offers.

"Right Down the Line" was the second single from City to City. The song reached No. 12 on the Billboard Hot 100 chart and No. 1 on the Hot Adult Contemporary Tracks charts in the US. It remained at the top of the adult contemporary chart for four non-consecutive weeks. The third single from the album, "Home and Dry", reached No. 28 in the US Top 40 in early 1979.

Rafferty's next album, Night Owl, also did well. Guitarist Richard Thompson performed on the track "Take The Money and Run", and the title track was a UK No. 5 hit in 1979. "Days Gone Down" reached No. 17 in the US. The follow-up single "Get It Right Next Time" made the UK and US Top 40.

=== Snakes and Ladders, Sleepwalking and North and South ===
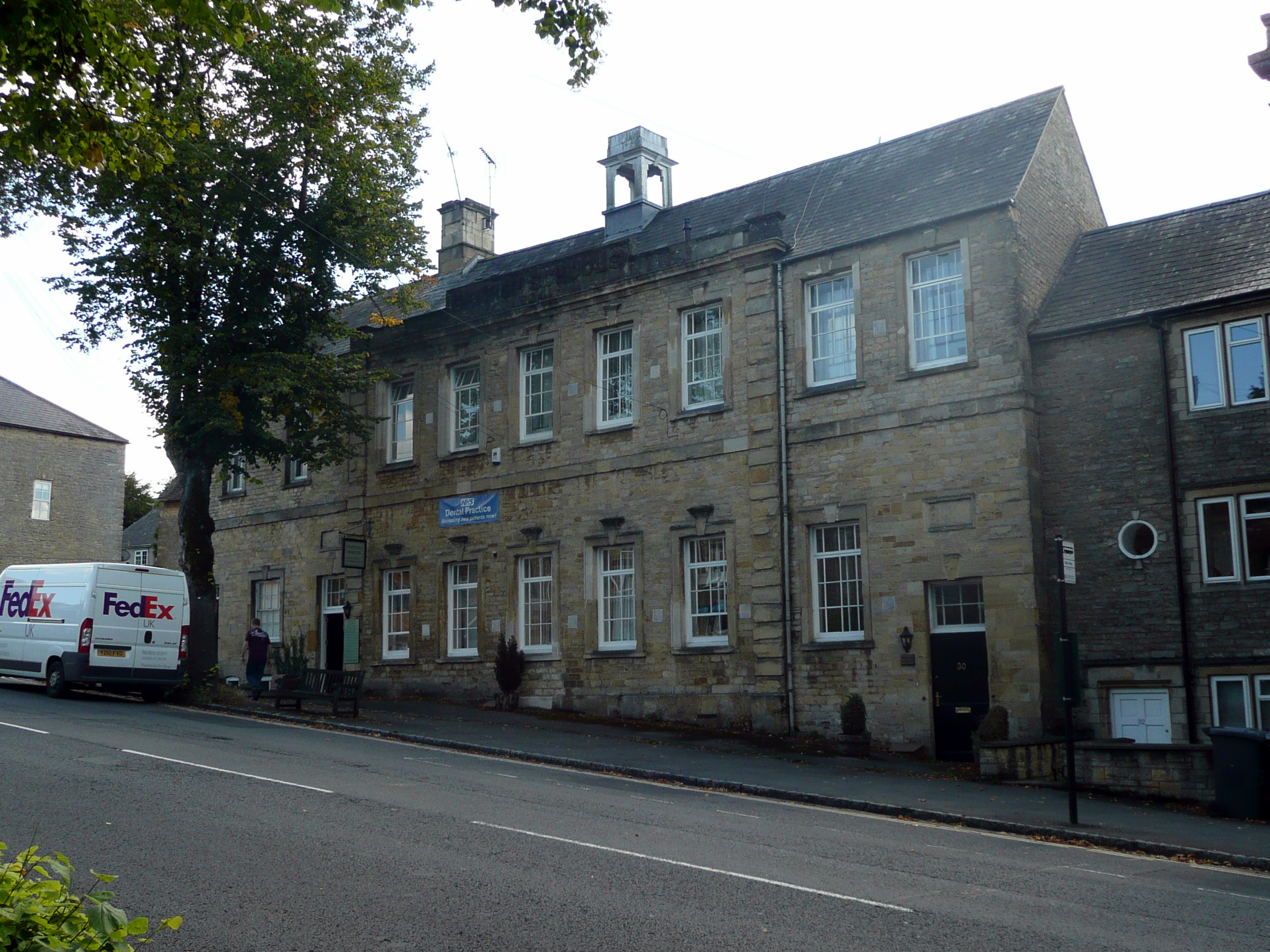
Several of Rafferty's solo albums, including City to City and Night Owl, and parts of Snakes and Ladders and Sleepwalking, were recorded at Chipping Norton Recording Studios

Subsequent albums, such as Snakes and Ladders (1980), Sleepwalking (1982), and North and South (1988), fared less well, perhaps due partly to Rafferty's longstanding reluctance to perform live, which he was uncomfortable doing.

In 1980, Rafferty and Murphy produced a record for Richard and Linda Thompson; though never released, it eventually evolved into their album Shoot Out the Lights.

In his next album, Sleepwalking (1982), Rafferty took a very different approach to his work. Christopher Neil replaced Hugh Murphy, Rafferty's usual producer. Neil dispensed with the richly detailed arrangements notable on Rafferty's three previous records, and introduced synthesisers and drum machines that gave the album a harder, less acoustic sound. According to Murphy, interviewed a decade later: "Gerry had made three albums on the trot and I think he was pretty jaded at that time and feeling the pressure and he just thought, 'Well, I'll try another tack,' which is understandable". Instead of a cover painting and hand-lettering by John Patrick Byrne, who had illustrated every previous Rafferty and Stealers Wheel album, Sleepwalking featured a simple, stark photograph of an empty road stretching to the sky. The deeply introspective lyrics of Sleepwalking suggest Rafferty found success far from glamorous. Tracks like "Standing at the Gates", "Change of Heart", and "The Right Moment" suggest the singer was exhausted, burnt-out, and desperately seeking a new direction, and they continued his long-running theme of alienation. Several years later, liner notes for the compilation album Right Down the Line (prepared with Rafferty's close co-operation) confirmed this, noting the singer was now "finding himself at the crossroads and looking to replace the treadmill with a new dimension in his life".

Rafferty sang the Mark Knopfler-penned song "The Way It Always Starts" (1983) on the soundtrack of the film Local Hero. That same year, Rafferty announced his intention to take a break and devote more time to his family: "It dawned on me that since Baker Street I had been touring the world, travelling everywhere and seeing nowhere. Whatever I do in the future, it's at my own pace, on my own terms."

Living at 16th-century Tye Farm in Hartfield near the Kent-Sussex border, Rafferty installed electric gates to protect his privacy, built a recording studio, and worked largely by himself or with Murphy. In 1987, Rafferty and Murphy co-produced The Proclaimers first UK hit single "Letter from America".

According to his former wife Carla, who discouraged visitors: "He was just stalling for time. Maybe some new project would suddenly happen, but I knew he'd crossed the line as far as the record business went." His next album, North and South, was released in 1988. In an interview that year with Colin Irwin, Rafferty mentioned that he was interested in doing more production work and writing film soundtracks, and even floated the idea of writing a musical about the life of Robert Louis Stevenson. Reviews of the album were mixed. In The Times, critic David Sinclair was particularly scathing: "On North and South, it sounds as if he has thumbed a lift up the road to a mock-Texan bar somewhere in his native Scotland. There is a mid-Atlantic blandness lurking behind the rococo roots veneer."

In the early 1990s, Rafferty recorded a cover version of the Bob Dylan song "The Times They Are a-Changin'" with Barbara Dickson, who had contributed backing vocals to both City to City and Night Owl. The track appeared on Dickson's albums Don't Think Twice It's All Right (1992) and The Barbara Dickson Collection (2006).

=== On a Wing and a Prayer and Over My Head ===
Rafferty released two further albums in the 1990s in what musician Tom Robinson later described as "a major return to form". On a Wing and a Prayer (1992) reunited him with his Stealers Wheel partner Egan on several tracks. It included three tracks co-written with Rafferty's brother Jim, also a singer-songwriter, who had been signed to Decca Records in the 1970s. Rafferty recorded a new version of his Humblebums song "Her Father Didn't Like Me Anyway" on the album Over My Head (1994). These were the last two records Rafferty produced with Hugh Murphy, who died in 1998. According to guitarist Hugh Burns, Murphy's death was "a great blow to Gerry" and marked the end of a creative partnership that had lasted almost 30 years.

=== Another World ===
By the end of the 1990s, new technology enabled Rafferty to distance himself even further from the conventional approach of the music industry and work entirely on his own terms. Now based in London, he employed sound engineer Giles Twigg to assemble a Digidesign mobile recording studio and, with Twigg's help, recorded the album Another World in London, Scotland, Barbados, France, and Italy with collaborators from previous albums, including Hugh Burns, Mark Knopfler, Kenny Craddock, and Mo Foster. Through his company Icon Music, Rafferty promoted and sold the album independently on a website created specifically for the purpose.

Another World, released in 2000, was originally available only via direct order from his website, but since 2003 has been available on the Hypertension label. Another World, almost an esoteric work, also with the assistance of Mark Knopfler and Egan, featured an album cover illustrated by John Byrne, who also illustrated the covers for Can I Have My Money Back?, City to City, Night Owl, and Snakes and Ladders, and all three Stealers Wheel albums. Byrne was also responsible for one of Rafferty's most prized possessions: a hand-painted Martin acoustic guitar bearing his portrait and the name "Gerry Rafferty", which features in many photographs of the singer.

Another World marked a new departure for the singer. As he explained in a press release heralding the new record in November 2000: "My heart and soul have gone into this album, and by releasing it in this way my creative influence has not been diluted in any way." Finally, thanks to the Internet, it seemed Rafferty no longer needed the music industry: technology was allowing him to put his music directly in the hands of an appreciative audience. Rafferty felt he had matured as an artist, as he told the Evening Standard at the time of the release: "At my time of life, I don't want to be talking to 23-year-old record executives who are just trying to sell their products to 19-year-olds. I'm older and my audience is older. They'll know where to find me." In the same interview, he said that the entire record had been made for approximately £200,000, with half spent on travel, the recording system costing £75,000, and the website and marketing adding £25,000.

Rafferty maintained his enthusiasm for this new approach to recording for the next three years. In a blog posting dated 31 March 2004 he wrote: "Let's get back to music: after all that's the only reason that this website has been set up." Another posting announced that Rafferty would begin to release music regularly as free downloads: "In reality, Gerry could put a new track out every two weeks or so. We will keep you informed of developments as they happen." Only a handful of tracks were ever released, however, and the website eventually closed down without any explanation.

=== Life Goes On ===
During November 2009, Rafferty released what would be his final album, Life Goes On. This was again on the Hypertension music label. Featuring 18 tracks, the album contains six new recordings, covers of Christmas carols, plus also some traditional songs that had previously been available on the Gerry Rafferty website. The remaining tracks are remastered tracks from his previous three albums.

=== Posthumous releases ===
Rafferty's death in January 2011 rekindled interest in the singer's work. His daughter Martha relaunched Rafferty's old website, gerryrafferty.com, with a full discography, rare photos, and new artwork by John Byrne. She portrayed her father as an autodidact with an "incredibly strong work ethic" and passion for books ("There were literally whole walls of book shelves at home and he'd read every single word. Mainly philosophy, art, religion, psychology and many a biography.").

In September 2011, EMI issued a remastered collector's edition of City to City featuring previously unheard demo versions of "Baker Street", "Mattie's Rag", "City to City", and other tracks from the album.

Other artists continue to be inspired by Rafferty's work. In 2012, Cuillin Recordings issued Paisley Spin, a remix of three tracks from Can I Have My Money Back? by Celtic fusion artist Martyn Bennett. Bonnie Raitt recorded a reggae treatment of "Right Down the Line" for her Slipstream album released 10 April 2012. Barbara Dickson released a tribute album of 13 Rafferty songs, To Each and Everyone: The Songs of Gerry Rafferty, in September 2013, including cover versions of "Baker Street", "The Ark", and "Steamboat Row".

On 3 September 2021 Parlophone UK released Rest in Blue, an album on which Martha Rafferty completed a project started by her father from demos left by Rafferty. The collection of blues, rock, and folk demos had been planned for a new album before his death.

== Attitude to the music industry ==
Rafferty drew a clear distinction between the artistic integrity of a musician, on the one hand, and the music industry's need to create celebrities and sell products, on the other. In an interview with Colin Irwin in 1988, he said: "There's a thin line between being a songwriter and a singer and being a personality . . . If you feel uncomfortable with it you shouldn't do it. It's not for me – there are too many inherent contradictions." Two decades later, speaking to the press after Rafferty's funeral, Charlie Reid of The Proclaimers confirmed Rafferty's dislike of celebrity: "He was not entirely comfortable with fame. Even more so than most people who work in this business, he saw it as not a good thing." Reid believed Rafferty was fundamentally unsuited to the pressures of celebrity: "He struck me as a very, very sensitive man and for someone like that, fame was probably not appropriate." Billy Connolly agrees that Rafferty had different priorities: "I wanted success and fame and I got it, to a degree. Gerry wanted respect. He wanted his talent to be respected. He wanted his songs to be respected. And he certainly got that."

The lyrics of "Baker Street" reflected Rafferty's disenchantment with certain elements of the music industry. This was elaborated on by music journalist Paul Gambaccini for BBC World News:

His song "Baker Street" was about how uncomfortable he felt in the star system, and what do you know, it was a giant world hit. The album City to City went to No. 1 in America, and suddenly he found that as a result of his protest, he was a bigger star than ever. And he now had more of what he didn't like. And although he had a few more hit singles in the United States, by 1980 it was basically all over, and when I say 'it', I mean basically his career, because he just was not comfortable with this.

Generally an autobiographical writer, Rafferty returned to this theme often, in the lyrics of Stealers Wheel songs such as "Stuck in the Middle With You" and "Good Businessman", and later solo tracks like "Take the Money and Run" (from Night Owl), "Welcome to Hollywood" (from Snakes and Ladders), and "Sleepwalking" (from the album of the same name). The liner notes to the compilation album Right Down the Line, written by Jerry Gilbert with Rafferty's close co-operation, note his consistent refusal to tour the United States and "generally 'play the industry game'." It was ironic that Rafferty—a lover and collector of religious icons, who would later name one of his publishing companies "Icon Music"—was also an iconoclast. According to Michael Gray, Rafferty's personal manager at the height of his success, he turned down many opportunities to work with other artists: "... he retained a healthy scepticism not just about the music industry but about society, money and politics in general. His background was soaked in Scottish socialism and poverty, his mind sharp and his personality acerbic, and he wasn't going to be dazzled by the glamour of success."

Rafferty never changed his mind about the music business; if anything, his views hardened. In 2000, he told the Paisley Daily Express that the second Stealers Wheel album, released in 1974, had been named Ferguslie Park, after a deprived area of Paisley, "to get as far away as possible from all the bullshit of the music industry in London." Monsignor John Tormey, celebrating Rafferty's funeral mass, suggested the singer's attitude to fame was an indication of his spiritual integrity: "He always searched for a more authentic way to live his life, shunning the outward trappings of celebrity so that he might live as he chose to live his life."

== Personal life ==
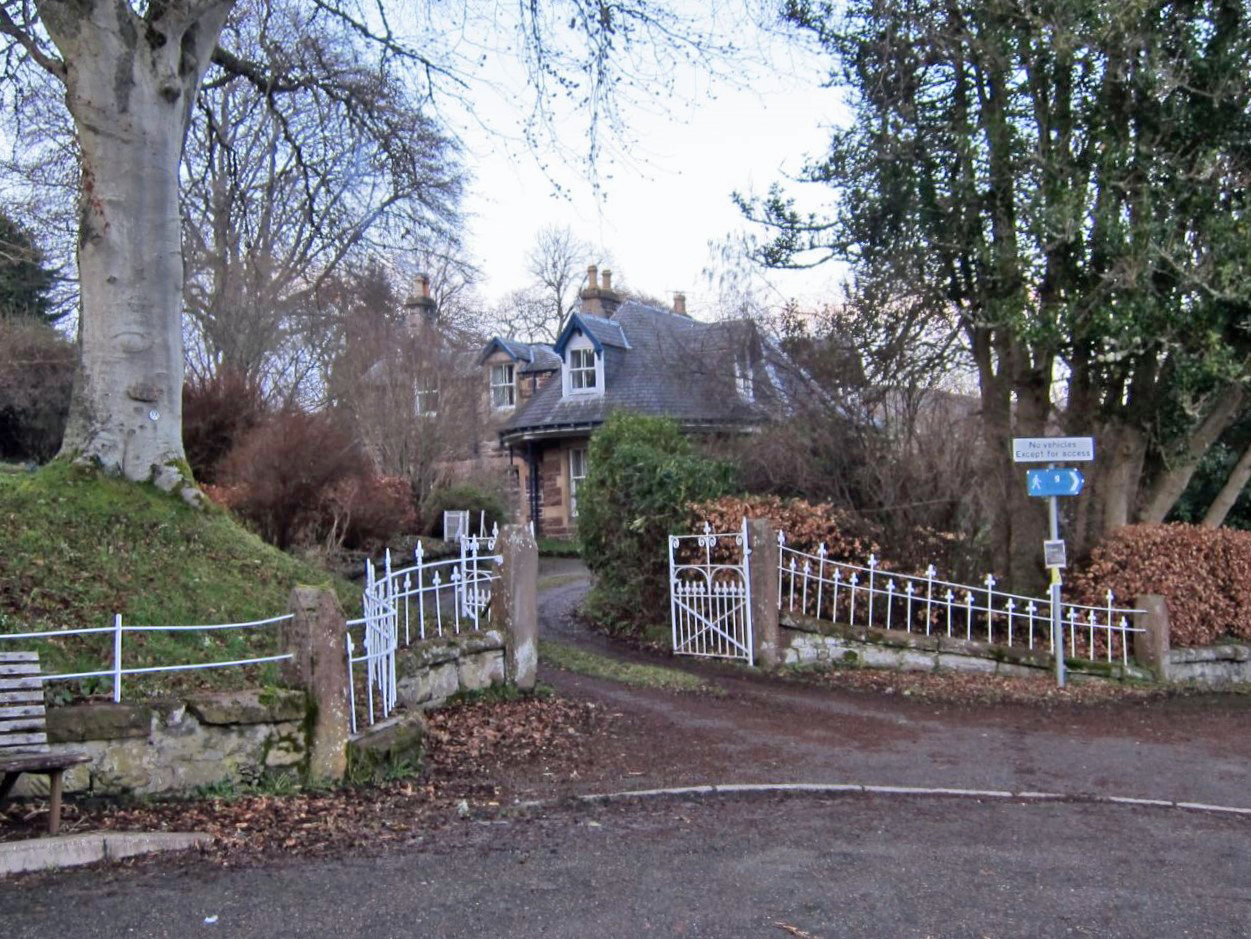
Eaglestone House in Strathpeffer

In 1965, 18-year-old Rafferty met 15-year-old Carla Ventilla, an apprentice hairdresser from an Italian family in Clydebank, at a dancehall—a story he later recounted in the song "Shipyard Town" on North and South. They married in 1970 and lived in Scotland with their daughter, Martha Mary, before moving to the south of England in the late 1970s, where they divided their time between their farm near the Kent–Sussex border and a home in Hampstead, London. Rafferty's lengthy commutes from London to Scotland inspired some songs on the album City to City (including the title track and "Mattie's Rag", which recounted his delight at being reunited with his daughter), while the later move south inspired "The Garden of England" (from the album Snakes and Ladders) and some songs on North and South.

In the late 1980s, Rafferty told journalist Colin Irwin: "I was always very conscious about keeping a low profile because that's the way I like to go about it. And I don't plan to be in the public eye too much now either." Rafferty and Carla Ventilla divorced in 1990.

In 1995, Rafferty was deeply affected by the death of his older brother Joseph, an event from which family and friends said he never fully recovered. After the completion of Another World in 2000, Rafferty planned to move back to Scotland and so bought Eaglestone House, "a substantial listed 1860s mansion" in the Highland village of Strathpeffer, although he sold the property two years later and never actually moved in.

=== Alcoholism ===
Rafferty enjoyed alcohol from a young age, and early songs, such as "One Drink Down", "Baker Street", and "Night Owl", freely mention the subject. According to Michael Gray, the singer's personal manager in the early 1980s: "It never occurred to me in all the time I knew him that he was heading for alcoholism. Maybe I should have realised, but I didn't. I'm unsure whether he did." As the 1980s progressed, Rafferty's growing drinking problem placed his marriage under impossible strain; his wife divorced him in 1990, although they remained close.

In the last decade of his life, having taken pains to shun the fame and celebrity that accompanied his musical achievements, Rafferty found himself making headlines once again as he struggled with alcoholism and depression and the increasingly erratic behaviour they spawned. While the news stories focused on Rafferty's binges, they revealed nothing of the impact on his family and friends. His girlfriend Enzina Fuschini said she: "felt that he was under some sort of evil spell. He felt crippled by it . . . I saw a man in despair". According to Rafferty's ex-wife Carla: "There was no hope. I would never have left him if there'd been a glimmer of a chance of him recovering."

=== Disappearance ===
In 2008, Rafferty moved away from California and briefly rented a home in Ireland, where his drinking soon became a problem again. In July that year, he flew to London, where he stayed in the five-star Westbury Hotel in Mayfair and began a four-day drinking binge during which he extensively damaged his room. Speaking to The Independent newspaper later, the hotel's director commented: "It was such a shame. In person, Mr Rafferty was a really nice man, he kept himself to himself and didn't bother the other guests but he was clearly on a downward spiral. He was in self-destruct mode."

There were conflicting reports about what happened next. The newspaper Scotland on Sunday reported that Rafferty had been asked to leave the hotel and had then checked himself into St Thomas' Hospital suffering from a chronic liver condition, brought on by heavy drinking. The same report claimed that on 1 August 2008, Rafferty had disappeared, leaving his belongings behind, and that the hospital had filed a missing persons report. No such missing persons report existed.

On 17 February 2009, The Guardian reported that Rafferty was in hiding in the south of England, being cared for by a friend. Subsequently, Rafferty's spokesperson Paul Charles told The Independent that he had been in touch with Rafferty a fortnight previously and that he was alive and well but had no plans to either record or tour. This was contradicted by a report in The Daily Telegraph on the following day, which quoted a statement his solicitors made to Channel 4 News: "Contrary to reports, Gerry is extremely well and has been living in Tuscany for the last six months... he continues to compose and record new songs and music... and he hopes to release a new album of his most recent work in the summer of this year [2009]." The album, titled Life Goes On, was released in November 2009.

After leaving St Thomas' Hospital, and while claiming he was in Tuscany, he was moving from one London hotel to another. During this time, he met Enzina Fuschini, an Italian artist living in Dorset. Rafferty and Fuschini rented a large home together in Upton, near Poole. Fuschini said she cared for the singer during 2009 and tried to help him overcome his alcoholism, and that he proposed to her at the Ritz Hotel in Paris on Christmas Eve that year.

== Death ==
In November 2010, Rafferty was admitted to the Royal Bournemouth Hospital where he was put on a life-support machine and treated for multiple organ failure. After being taken off life support, he rallied for a short time, and doctors thought that he might recover. Rafferty died of liver failure at the home of his daughter Martha in Stroud, Gloucestershire, on 4 January 2011. He was 63. Speaking of the last days she spent with him, Martha stated, “He was dying and we both knew it, and it was okay.... His journey to death was the most profound thing I’ve ever witnessed.”

A requiem mass was held for Rafferty at St Mirin's Cathedral in his native town of Paisley on 21 January 2011. The mass was streamed live over the Internet. Politicians in attendance were the First Minister of Scotland Alex Salmond MSP, Wendy Alexander MSP, Hugh Henry MSP, and Robin Harper MSP. The musicians present included Craig and Charlie Reid of The Proclaimers, former bandmates Joe Egan and Rab Noakes, Barbara Dickson, and Graham Lyle. The eulogy was given by Rafferty's longtime friend John Byrne. His remains were then cremated at the Woodside Crematorium in Paisley and his ashes scattered on Iona. He is survived by his daughter Martha, granddaughter Celia, and brother Jim.

=== Will and legal dispute over estate ===
In October 2011, newspapers reported that Rafferty's immediate family were the beneficiaries of his £1.25 million estate. Rafferty had apparently not changed his will after meeting Enzina Fuschini in 2008 and left her nothing. Fuschini contested the will, but it was later reported that she had lost her case and £75,000 legal costs were awarded against her.

== Tributes and legacy ==
Newspapers printed lengthy obituaries for the singer; in The Guardian, Michael Gray charted Rafferty's long downward spiral into alcoholism, while a full-page obituary in The Times summarised his career more positively: "As well as being a singer of considerable talent who at one time had the pop world at his feet, Gerry Rafferty was also a consummate songwriter, blessed with sensitivity and an enviable melodic flair that at its best recalled Paul McCartney."

Other entertainers also paid tribute to Rafferty, with comedian and ex-bandmate Billy Connolly calling him "a hugely talented songwriter and singer who will be greatly missed" and musician Tom Robinson saying, "His early work with Stealers Wheel was an inspiration to a whole generation of songwriters in the 70s, including me." Speaking after the funeral, Charlie Reid of The Proclaimers said: "I think Gerry Rafferty was one of the few people who really successfully straddled the worlds of both folk and popular music. He did it really well and he was respected in both camps." Barbara Dickson also paid tribute to her friend, whom she described as a "luminous, glorious Scottish musician". Finbar Furey, who knew Rafferty for over 40 years, said he "was in a different league completely. He didn't know how good he was. He was one of the most talented musicians and singers I ever knew but he completely underestimated his own talent. He was a very humble man." Shortly after news of the singer's death, Lily Allen tweeted the message "Rest in Peace Gerry x" with a video link to the song "Right Down the Line", reputedly one of her favourite music tracks. Electropop star Elly Jackson described "Right Down the Line" as "my favourite track of all time. It makes me think of home, nostalgia and happiness."

In November 2012, Rafferty's hometown of Paisley paid tribute to the singer by naming a street in the Shortroods area "Gerry Rafferty Drive". Gordon Laurie, director of the housing association behind the project, commented: "It is a fitting tribute to a brilliant musician who lives on through his music."

In January 2013, BBC Radio 2 re-broadcast their 2012 programme "Bring It All Home – Gerry Rafferty Remembered", which had been recorded live at Celtic Connections in Glasgow and was presented by Ricky Ross. Contributing artists included his friend Rab Noakes, The Proclaimers, Barbara Dickson, Ron Sexsmith, Jack Bruce, Paul Brady, Emma Pollock, James Vincent McMorrow and Betsy Cook. Rafferty's guitarist Hugh Burns, multi-instrumentalist Graham Preskett and saxophonist Mel Collins, were also featured.

== Discography ==
Studio albums

- Can I Have My Money Back? (1971)
- City to City (1978)
- Night Owl (1979)
- Snakes and Ladders (1980)
- Sleepwalking (1982)
- North and South (1988)
- On a Wing and a Prayer (1992)
- Over My Head (1994)
- Another World (2000)
- Life Goes On (2009)
- Rest in Blue (2021)
