= Hugh Burns (musician) =

Musician

Hugh Burns is a London-based Scottish guitarist and prolific recording artist. His guitar playing can be heard on many famous recordings, including Gerry Rafferty's "Baker Street" (1978) and "Careless Whisper" (1984) by George Michael/Wham!.

Burns has played on albums by:

- Joan Armatrading
- Teresa Brewer
- Jack Bruce
- Mutya Buena
- Tony Coe
- Randy Crawford
- Doris Day
- Anne Dudley
- Albert Hammond
- Roy Harper
- Marsha Hunt (actress, born 1946)
- Mick Karn
- Ute Lemper
- Paul McCartney
- Alison Moyet
- Oliver Nelson
- Mike Oldfield
- Elaine Paige
- Pet Shop Boys
- Gerry Rafferty
- Scott Walker
- Stealers Wheel
- Wham!

== History ==
Burns made his recording debut in 1970, playing electric guitar and classical guitar on the Oliver Nelson album Black, Brown and Beautiful. Since his debut, his guitar playing has featured on more than 130 albums.

In the early 1970s he played guitar with 22, a band led by singer Marsha Hunt, whom he lived with for three years.
