= Baker Street (song) =

1978 single by Gerry Rafferty

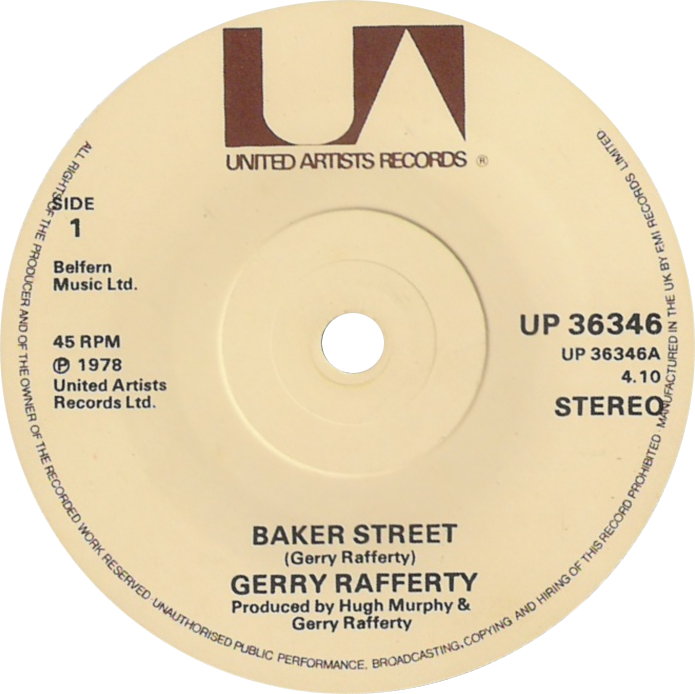
- Solid centre variant of the 1978 UK single

Single by Gerry Rafferty

from the album City to City
- B-side: "Big Change in the Weather"
- Released: 3 February 1978
- Recorded: 1977
- Studio: Chipping Norton Recording Studios (Oxfordshire)
- Genre: Rock; jazz rock; soft rock
- Length: 6:06 (album version); 4:10 (single version); 5:56 (US 12-inch promo single version); 6:29 (1989 “Right Down The Line” compilation remix version)
- Label: United Artists
- Songwriter: Gerry Rafferty
- Producers: Hugh Murphy; Gerry Rafferty

Gerry Rafferty singles chronology
"City to City" (1977)	"Baker Street" (1978)	"Right Down the Line" (1978)

Music video
- "Baker Street" on YouTube

Audio
- "Baker Street" (album version) on YouTube

Audio sample
- file; help

"Baker Street" is a single by the Scottish singer-songwriter Gerry Rafferty, released in February 1978. It won the 1979 Ivor Novello Award for Best Song Musically and Lyrically and reached the top three in the UK, US and elsewhere. The song is known for its saxophone riff, written by Rafferty and performed by Raphael Ravenscroft.

== Writing ==
"Baker Street" was included on Rafferty's second solo album, City to City (1978). It was his first album after the resolution of legal problems surrounding the breakup of his old band, Stealers Wheel, in 1975. In the intervening three years, Rafferty had been unable to release any material because of disputes over contractual obligations.

Rafferty wrote "Baker Street" while trying to extricate himself from his Stealers Wheel contracts. He was regularly travelling between his family home in Paisley, Scotland, and London. In London, he often stayed at a flat off Baker Street in Marylebone belonging to his friend Iain Campbell of Stealers Wheel. According to Campbell's friend Joe O'Brien, Campbell was the person described in the lyrics with that "look on his face". The resolution of Rafferty's legal and financial frustrations may have inspired the final verse:

When you wake up it's a new morning
The sun is shining, it's a new morning
You're going, you're going home

Rafferty's daughter Martha suggested that he could also have taken inspiration from a book he was reading while travelling, Colin Wilson's The Outsider (1956), which explores ideas of alienation and creativity and a longing to be connected.

"Baker Street" was recorded in 1977 at Chipping Norton Studios, Oxfordshire, during the sessions for City to City. It was co-produced by Rafferty and Hugh Murphy. It features a guitar solo played by Hugh Burns.

=== Saxophone riff ===
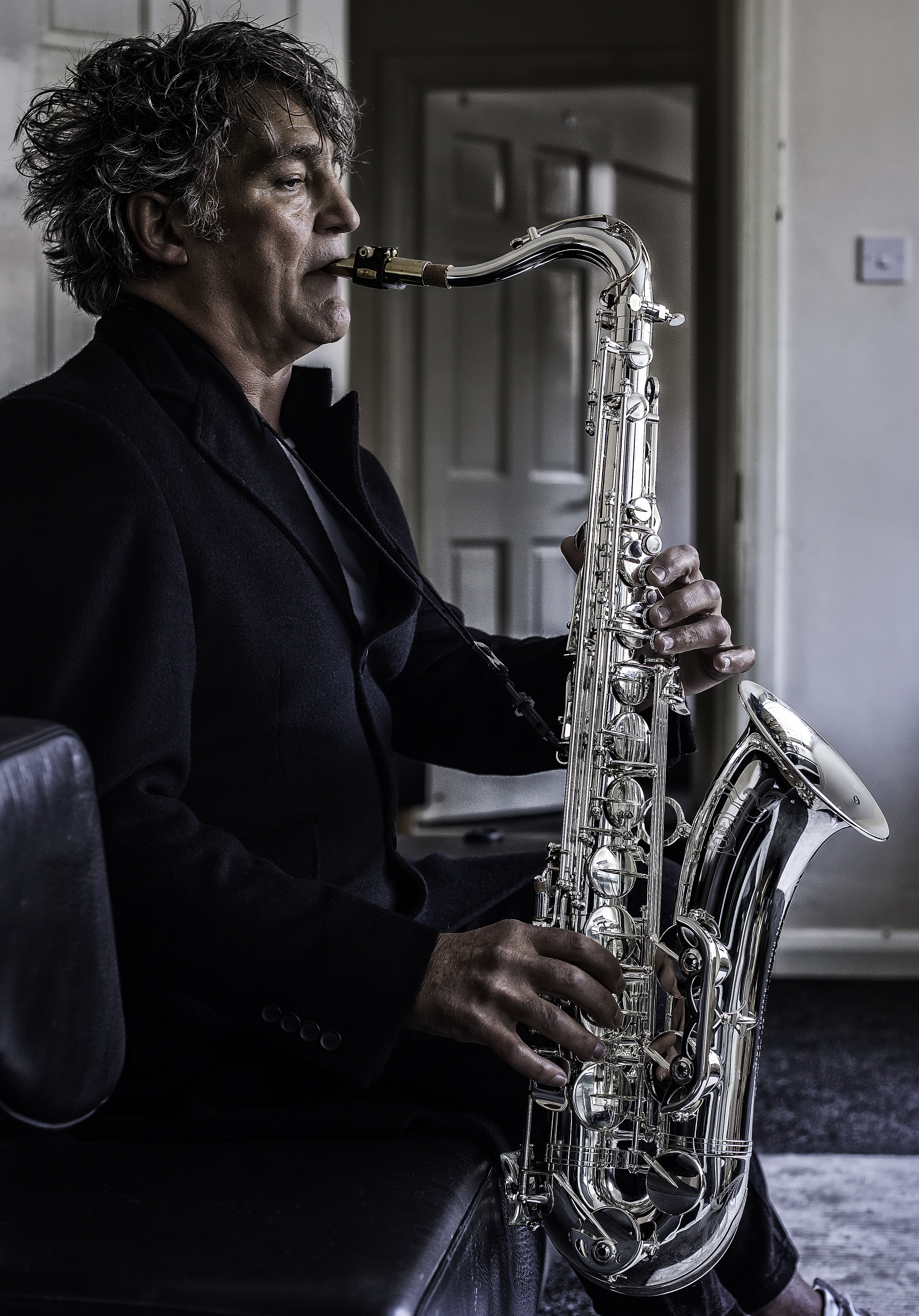
Raphael Ravenscroft (pictured in 2014 with a tenor saxophone) played the alto sax riff, based on a guitar part in Rafferty's demo.

"Baker Street" features a prominent eight-bar saxophone riff by the session musician Raphael Ravenscroft, played as a break between verses. Billboard described it as "the most recognizable sax riff in pop music history". It is said to have been responsible for a resurgence in the sales of saxophones and their use in mainstream pop music and television advertising.

Rafferty said Ravenscroft had been his second choice, after Pete Zorn, who was unavailable. Ravenscroft came to the studio to record a soprano saxophone part, and suggested that he use instead his alto saxophone. Ravenscroft was reportedly paid £27 for the session. In 2011, Ravenscroft said listening to the song irritated him because he was out of tune.

According to Ravenscroft, Rafferty instructed him to fill several gaps in "Baker Street". He said: "Most of what I played was an old blues riff. If you're asking me: 'Did Gerry hand me a piece of music to play?' then no, he didn't." This was disputed by Rafferty, who said he was irritated that people assumed Ravenscroft had written it. He said: "It was my line. I sang it to him."

Rafferty's account was corroborated by Burns, who said the part also appeared on Rafferty's demo, played on guitar. Burns said Rafferty had also asked him to try playing it, but they agreed it would be better suited to saxophone. Rafferty's demo, with the riff played on guitar, was released on the 2011 reissue of City to City. In the liner notes, Rafferty's collaborator Rab Noakes wrote: "Let's hope [the demo] will, at last, silence all who keep on asserting that the saxophone player came up with the melody line."

A similar saxophone melody appears on the 1968 Steve Marcus track "Half a Heart", credited to the vibraphonist Gary Burton. When interviewed by The Atlantic, Burton suggested Rafferty may have subconsciously plagiarised it, likening it to the lawsuit over the 1970 George Harrison song "My Sweet Lord". However, Burns said the similarity was a coincidence and that Rafferty "was an artist through and through".

The saxophone riff is the subject of an urban legend created in the 1980s by the British writer and broadcaster Stuart Maconie. In the spoof "Thrills' Believe it or Not" section of the music magazine NME, Maconie falsely claimed that the broadcaster Bob Holness had played the saxophone part. The claim was widely repeated.

== Chart performance ==
Released as a single in 1978, "Baker Street" reached No. 3 in the UK. In the US, it peaked at number one on the Cash Box Top 100 and number two on the Billboard Hot 100 where it stayed for six weeks, kept out of the number one spot by Andy Gibb's "Shadow Dancing". The song spent four weeks at number one in Canada, reached number one in Australia, and made it into the top 10 in seven European countries in addition to the UK. In October 2010, "Baker Street" was recognized by BMI for surpassing five million performances worldwide.

An urban myth claims that "Baker Street" overtook "Shadow Dancing" on the Billboard Hot 100 during one of its seven weeks on top in 1978, with Casey Kasem recording his American Top 40 countdown placing it at No. 1. However, at a dinner with Gibb's managers, the Billboard chart director of the time, Bill Wardlow, was allegedly told that if "Shadow Dancing" did not remain at No. 1, Gibb would be pulled from the lineup of an upcoming Billboard-organized concert. Wardlow then supposedly asked Billboard to leave the song at the top, and Kasem was told to re-record his countdown.

== Legacy ==
"Baker Street" won the 1979 Ivor Novello Award for Best Song Musically and Lyrically. It was cited by the guitarist Slash in 1987 as an influence on his guitar solo in "Sweet Child o' Mine". The Canadian rock musician A.C. Newman cited the song as an inspiration for his album Shut Down the Streets (2012). Dave Ramsey has used "Baker Street" as bumper music for his radio show since the show's debut in 1992.

== Personnel ==
- Gerry Rafferty – lead vocals, rhythm guitar
- Raphael Ravenscroft – alto and soprano saxophone
- Hugh Burns – lead guitar
- Nigel Jenkins – rhythm guitar
- Tommy Eyre – synthesiser, electric and acoustic piano
- Gary Taylor – bass
- Henry Spinetti – drums
- Glen Le Fleur – congas
- Graham Preskett – string arrangements

== Charts ==
=== Weekly charts ===
Chart (1978)	Peak position
Australia (Kent Music Report)	1
Austria (Ö3 Austria Top 40)	4
Belgium (Ultratop 50 Flanders)	9
Canada Top Singles (RPM)	1
Canada Adult Contemporary (RPM)	4
France (SNEP)	2
Ireland (IRMA)	3
Netherlands (Dutch Top 40)	9
Netherlands (Single Top 100)	16
New Zealand (Recorded Music NZ)	4
South Africa (Springbok Radio)	1
Switzerland (Schweizer Hitparade)	2
UK Singles (Official Charts)	3
US Billboard Hot 100	2
US Easy Listening (Billboard)	4
US Cash Box Top 100	1
West Germany (GfK)	3

Chart (1990)	Peak position
UK Singles (Official Charts); Remix	53

Chart (2011)	Peak position
Germany (GfK)	69
Netherlands (Single Top 100)	27
Switzerland (Schweizer Hitparade)	53
UK Singles (Official Charts)	55

=== Year-end charts ===
Chart (1978)	Position
Australia (Kent Music Report)	10
Austria (Ö3 Austria Top 40)	8
Belgium (Ultratop)	63
Canada Top Singles (RPM)	8
Netherlands (Dutch Top 40)	77
New Zealand (RIANZ)	21
South Africa (Springbok Radio)	16
Switzerland (Schweizer Hitparade)	8
UK Singles (OCC)	17
US Billboard Hot 100	26
US Cash Box Top 100	12
West Germany (Media Control)	8

== Certifications ==
Region	Certification	Certified units/sales
New Zealand (RMNZ)	2× Platinum	60,000^{‡}
United Kingdom (BPI)	Platinum	600,000^{‡}
United States (RIAA)	Gold	1,000,000^{^}
^{^} Shipments figures based on certification alone.^{‡} Sales+streaming figures based on certification alone.

== Undercover version ==
"Baker Street"

Single by Undercover

from the album Check Out the Groove
- Released: 3 August 1992
- Length: 4:04
- Label: PWL International
- Songwriter: Gerry Rafferty
- Producer: Steve Mac

Undercover singles chronology
"Baker Street" (1992)	"Never Let Her Slip Away" (1992)

Music video
- "Baker Street" on YouTube

British dance group Undercover covered the song on their 1992 album Check Out the Groove. This version was released in August 1992 by PWL and produced by Steve Mac. It reached No. 2 on the UK Singles Chart and became a top-three hit in Austria, Belgium, Germany, Ireland, the Netherlands, and Switzerland. A music video was produced to promote the single, shot in black-and-white.

=== Critical reception ===
A writer for Lennox Herald named the song a "stand out" from the Undercover album. Pan-European magazine Music & Media wrote, "Gerry Rafferty's rainy days anthem is now transferred from the comfortable living room to the heat of clubland. The typical saxophone hook is on acid as well." Mark Frith from Smash Hits commented, "This one's quite good actually. Transformed from a hoary old late '70s epic into a PWL rave anthem for the '90s, 'Baker Street' has tootling sax, great vocals and is probably the most unusual record turned into a rave tune ever."

=== Track listing ===
1. "Baker Street" (edit) – 4:04
2. "Baker Street" (extended mix) – 5:10
3. "Sha-Bang" (extended mix) – 5:49

=== Charts ===
==== Weekly charts ====
Chart (1992)	Peak position
Australia (ARIA)	100
Austria (Ö3 Austria Top 40)	3
Belgium (Ultratop 50 Flanders)	2
Denmark (IFPI)	4
Europe (Eurochart Hot 100)	4
Europe (European Dance Radio)	6
Finland (Suomen virallinen lista)	9
Germany (GfK)	3
Ireland (IRMA)	2
Italy (Musica e dischi)	7
Netherlands (Dutch Top 40)	2
Netherlands (Single Top 100)	3
Sweden (Sverigetopplistan)	7
Switzerland (Schweizer Hitparade)	2
UK Singles (Official Charts)	2
UK Airplay (Music Week)	5
UK Dance (Music Week)	4
UK Club Chart (Music Week)	29

==== Year-end charts ====
Chart (1992)	Position
Belgium (Ultratop)	24
Europe (Eurochart Hot 100)	21
Europe (European Dance Radio)	15
Germany (Media Control)	32
Netherlands (Dutch Top 40)	23
Netherlands (Single Top 100)	33
Sweden (Topplistan)	49
UK Singles (OCC)	11
UK Airplay (Music Week)	29

=== Certifications ===
Region	Certification	Certified units/sales
Germany (BVMI)	Gold	250,000^{^}
^{^} Shipments figures based on certification alone.

=== Release history ===
Region	Date	Format(s)	Label(s)	Ref.
United Kingdom	3 August 1992	—N/a	PWL International	
Australia	24 August 1992	CD	PWL International	
Australia	28 September 1992	Cassette	PWL International	
Japan	25 January 1993	Mini-CD	380	

== Foo Fighters version ==
"Baker Street"

Song by Foo Fighters
- Released: 19 January 1998
- Recorded: 1997
- Length: 5:39
- Label: Roswell; Capitol
- Songwriter: Gerry Rafferty
- Producer: Simon Askew

The American rock band Foo Fighters covered the song on their 1998 "My Hero" UK CD single release, on the Australian tour pack (grey cover) release, on the limited-edition European bonus EP and as one of several bonus tracks added to the remastered tenth anniversary release of their second studio album, The Colour and the Shape, reissued in 2007. The saxophone part is played on electric guitar.
