= Chipping Norton Recording Studios =

Recording studio in Oxfordshire, England

Coordinates: 51.9414°N 1.5480°W

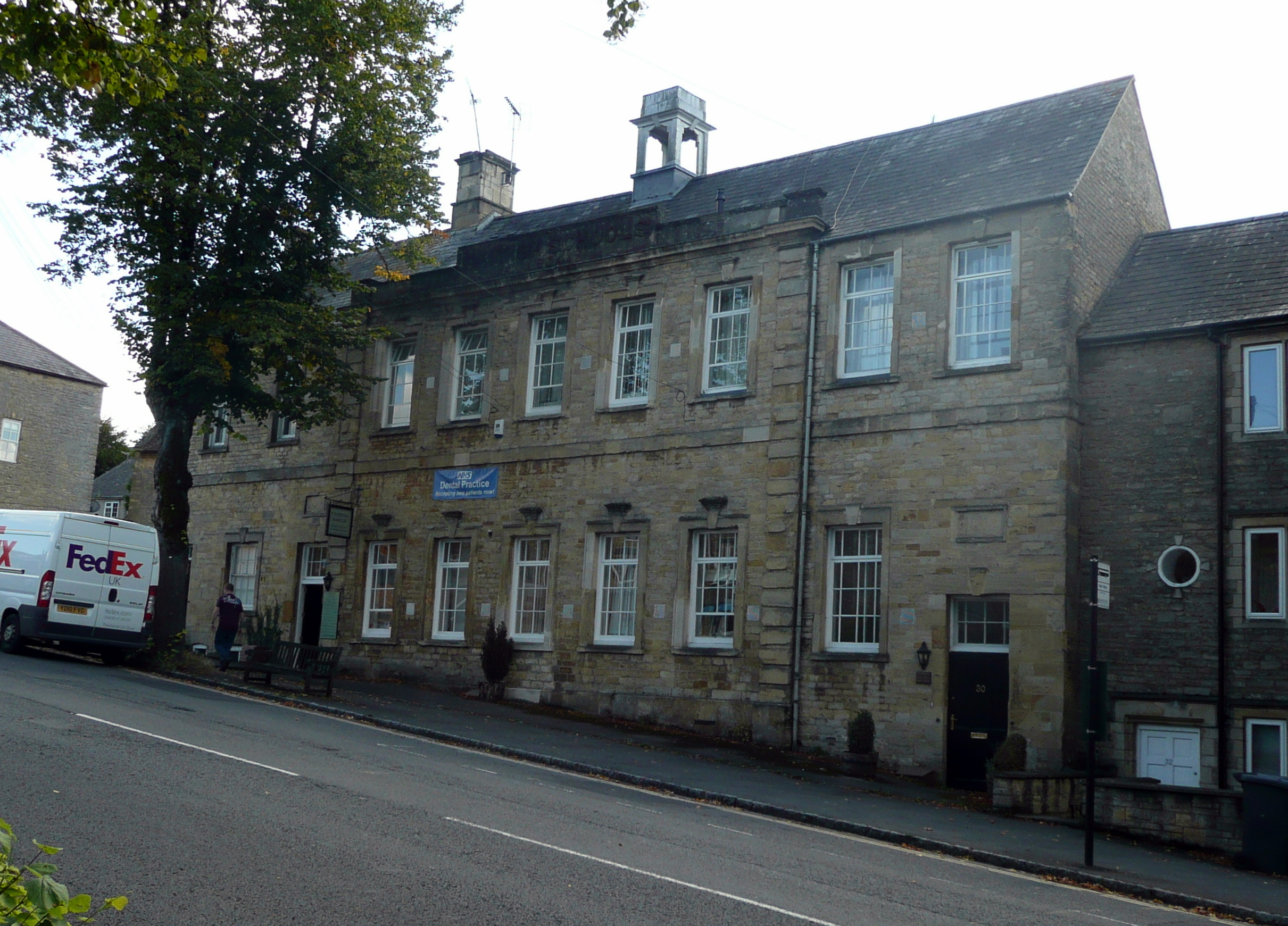
- 26/30 New Street, formerly home of Chipping Norton Recording Studios.
- Type: Recording studio
- Industry: Music industry
- Founded: 1971
- Area served: Chipping Norton, Oxfordshire, England
- Key people: Richard Vernon and Mike Vernon

Chipping Norton Recording Studios was a residential recording studio in Chipping Norton, Oxfordshire, England, which operated from 1971 until October 1999.

The studios were created by Mike Vernon and Richard Vernon as the in-house studio for Mike Vernon's record company Blue Horizon Records, and operated out of the former British Schools building at 26-30 New Street, a Grade II listed building in the town centre. Further properties were added in adjacent buildings and the studio eventually provided 15 bedrooms with on-site catering for visiting musicians.

The studios became a commercial enterprise, and songs recorded there included "Baker Street" by Gerry Rafferty, "In The Army Now" by Status Quo, "Too Shy" by Kajagoogoo, "I Should Have Known Better" by Jim Diamond, "Promise Me" by Beverley Craven, "Mirrors" by Sally Oldfield, "I'm Gonna Be (500 Miles)" by the Proclaimers, "Perfect" by Fairground Attraction, "(I Just) Died in Your Arms" by Cutting Crew, "Eighteen With A Bullet" by Pete Wingfield, "Hocus Pocus" by Focus and "Bye, Bye, Baby (Baby Goodbye)" by the Bay City Rollers. Duran Duran recorded most of their debut album, Duran Duran (1981), with Colin Thurston as producer. Radiohead recorded their 1993 debut album, Pablo Honey, at Chipping Norton, including their debut single, "Creep".

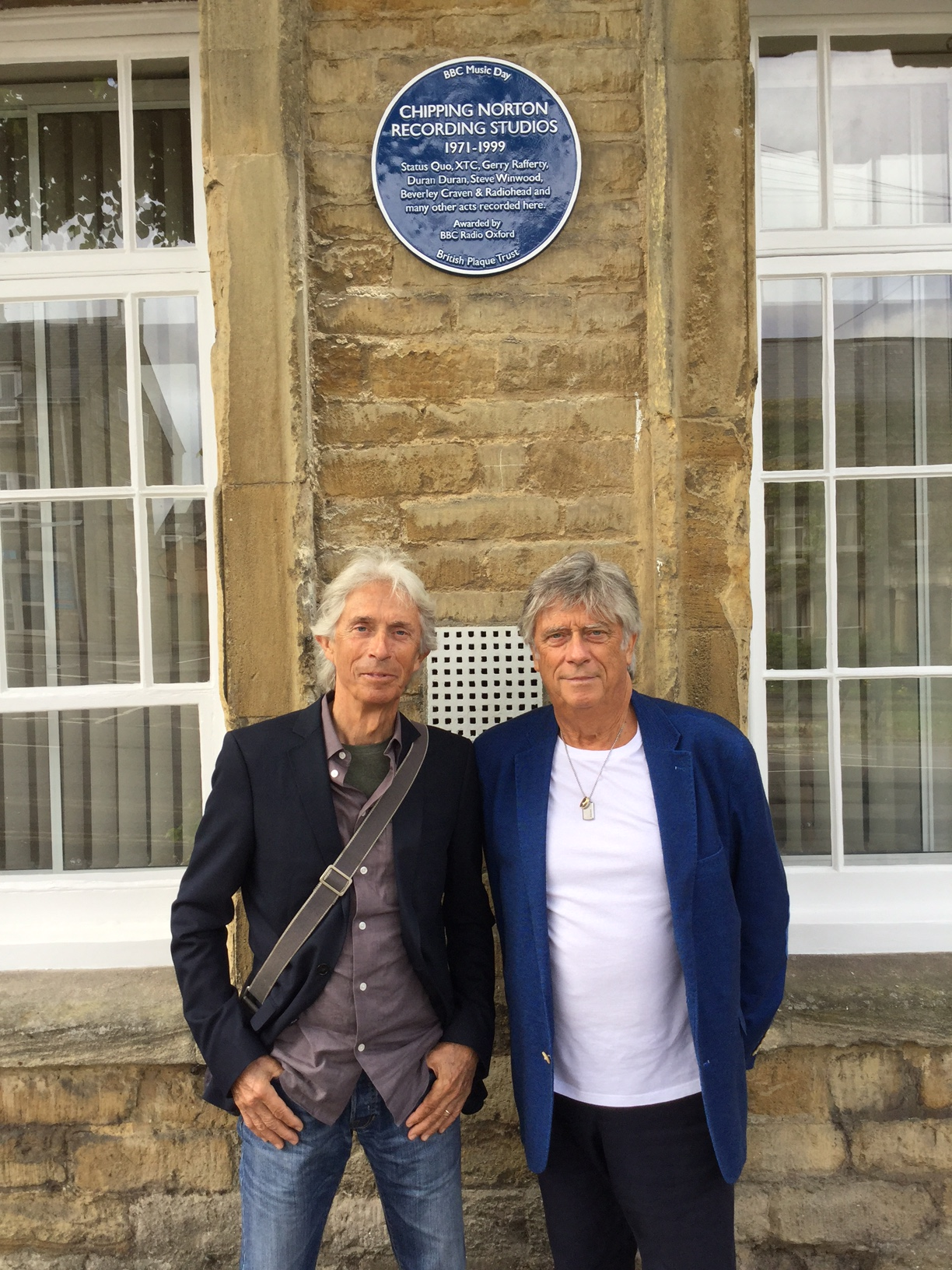
Co-founders Richard and Mike Vernon beneath the Blue Plaque presented as part of the BBC Music Day, 15 June 2017

The first recording session took place in 1972, when Dutch band The Livin' Blues recorded their album Rocking At The Tweed Mill, referencing Bliss Tweed Mill which is a prominent feature of Chipping Norton. The last album recorded there was Iommi by Tony Iommi, which was released in October 2000.

On 15 June 2017, BBC Music Day, broadcast throughout the UK, awarded the studio a blue plaque for its part in the musical heritage of England.

== See also ==
- List of British recording studios
