= Changing Faces – The Best of Louise =

Greatest hits album by Louise
- Released: 10 September 2001
- Recorded: 1992–2001
- Genre: Pop; R&B
- Label: EMI

Louise chronology
Elbow Beach (2000)	Changing Faces – The Best of Louise (2001)	Finest Moments (2002)

Singles from Changing Faces – The Best of Louise
- 1. "Stuck in the Middle with You" Released: 27 August 2001

Professional ratings
Review scores
Source	Rating
MTV Asia	7.0/10
Yahoo! Music	6.0/10 stars

Changing Faces – The Best of Louise is the first compilation album by the British singer Louise. It was released in 2001 and peaked at number 9 on the UK Albums Chart.

After her third solo album, Elbow Beach, Redknapp was coming to the end of her five-album deal with EMI (which included the album Always & Forever which she had made with Eternal). It was decided that a greatest hits package would be released, incorporating all of Louise's 15 top-10 hit singles. The album featured three new tracks and be Louise's final release under EMI. For the album Louise released a cover of "Stuck in the Middle with You", which entered the UK chart at number 4 and was supported by a humorous promo video that spoofed the Quentin Tarantino film Reservoir Dogs. The album was a UK top 10 hit and was certified Silver by the BPI for UK sales of over 60,000 copies.

In support of the album, Louise embarked on the second solo tour of her career, playing smaller locations across the country. After the touring and promotion for Changing Faces, Louise officially left EMI.

== Track listing ==
Changing Faces – The Best of Louise track listing
No.	Title	Original album	Length
1.	"Naked"	Naked
2.	"Just a Step from Heaven" (radio mix; with Eternal)	Always & Forever
3.	"Undivided Love" (single mix)	Naked
4.	"Stuck in the Middle with You"	New recording
5.	"Stay" (7" mix; with Eternal)	Always & Forever
6.	"Let's Go Round Again"	Woman in Me
7.	"Light of My Life"	Naked
8.	"2 Faced"	Elbow Beach
9.	"The Slightest Touch" (Almighty 7" radio mix)	New recording
10.	"One Kiss from Heaven" (remix)	Naked
11.	"In Walked Love"	Naked
12.	"Beautiful Inside"	Elbow Beach
13.	"Oh Baby I..." (with Eternal)	Always & Forever
14.	"Arms Around the World" (radio mix)	Woman in Me
15.	"All That Matters"	Woman in Me
16.	"Come and Get It"	New recording

Changing Faces – The Best of Louise Japanese bonus track
No.	Title	Original album	Length
17.	"First Kiss (The Wedding Song)"	Elbow Beach

Changing Faces – The Best of Louise promotional limited edition CD2: The Mixes
No.	Title	Length
1.	"Naked" (Tony De Vit Remix)
2.	"Undivided Love" (T-Empo Vocal)
3.	"Arms Around the World" (Farley & Heller Fire Island Vocal Mix)
4.	"Let's Go Round Again" (Rated PG Club Mix)
5.	"2 Faced" (Jazzy M Twisted & Deceitful Vocal Mix)
6.	"Let's Go Round Again" (Tilt's Phazon Mix)

== Charts ==
Chart performance for Changing Faces – The Best of Louise
Chart (2001)	Peak position
Scottish Albums (OCC)	11
UK Albums (OCC)	9

== Certifications ==
Certifications for Changing Faces – The Best of Louise
Region	Certification	Certified units/sales
United Kingdom (BPI)	Silver	60,000^{^}
^{^} Shipments figures based on certification alone.
