= Greatest Hits (Louise album) =

Greatest hits album by Louise
- Released: 2 June 2023
- Genre: Pop; R&B
- Length: 110:21
- Label: Tag8; BMG

Louise chronology
Heavy Love (2020)	Greatest Hits (2023)	Confessions (2025)

Singles from Greatest Hits
- 1. "Super Magic" Released: 10 November 2022; 2. "High Hopes" Released: 27 April 2023

Greatest Hits is the third compilation album by the British singer Louise. It was released on 2 June 2023 by Tag8 and BMG. The album contains singles throughout Louise's career and also reimagined versions to celebrate 30 years in music.

== Background ==
In an interview with Fault magazine, Redknapp shared, "I wanted to make music I loved rather than just ticking a box for what worked in the industry. I think I’ve forever had to fight to prove myself [...] I'm still fighting to prove myself. I feel that the hardest hurdle is to keep on knocking down those doors to prove myself." "Super Magic" is Redknapp's first release under BMG. It debuted at number 89 on the UK Official Singles Downloads Chart Top 100 on 18 November 2022. On 12 January 2023, Redknapp announced that her Greatest Hits collection, spanning thirty years in the music industry, would be released in June 2023. Information at the time showed that the compilation would contain five new songs, including a cover of Janet Jackson's 1997 single "Together Again".

== Singles ==
On 10 November 2022, Redknapp released the single "Super Magic".

Louise released reimagined versions of her singles "Just a Step from Heaven" and "Naked" as promotional singles from the compilation.

The second official single from the compilation, "High Hopes", was released on 27 April 2023.

== Promotion ==
On 1 June 2023, Louise performed in concert at the Shepherd's Bush Empire; Michelle Gayle appeared as a guest and former Eternal bandmate Kéllé Bryan made a surprise appearance on stage to perform their 1994 single "Crazy". On 2 June 2023, Louise appeared on This Morning to discuss her career and album, and was interviewed on BBC Breakfast three days later.

== Chart performance ==
On 5 June 2023, the UK's Official Charts Company album chart update placed Greatest Hits at number 6. It debuted and peaked at number 11 on the official album chart, number 4 on the sales chart and at number 3 on both the download and independent album charts, before dropping out of the chart the following week.

== Track listings ==
=== Greatest Hits ===
1. "Super Magic" – 3:43
2. "High Hopes" – 2:57
3. "Right Now" – 3:10
4. "Feel" – 2:35
5. "Hurt" – 3:15
6. "Not the Same" – 2:57
7. "Lead Me On" – 3:42
8. "Stretch" – 3:22
9. "Pandora's Kiss" – 3:13
10. "Stuck in the Middle with You" – 3:45
11. "Beautiful Inside" – 3:15
12. "2 Faced" – 3:40
13. "All That Matters" (radio mix) – 3:26
14. "Let's Go Round Again" – 3:45
15. "Arms Around the World" – 4:04
16. "One Kiss from Heaven" (remix) – 3:50
17. "Undivided Love" – 3:46
18. "Naked" (radio mix) – 3:34
19. "In Walked Love" – 3:49
20. "Light of My Life" – 4:14

=== Reimagined (deluxe edition) ===
1. "Stay (reimagined)" – 3:56
2. "Just a Step from Heaven (reimagined)" – 3:27
3. "So Good (reimagined)" – 3:42
4. "Light of My Life (reimagined)" – 4:37
5. "In Walked Love (reimagined)" – 4:14
6. "Naked (reimagined)" – 3:51
7. "Arms Around the World (reimagined)" – 3:49
8. "Let's Go Round Again (reimagined)" – 3:47
9. "2 Faced (reimagined)" – 3:35
10. "Together Again" – 5:21

=== & More (special edition) ===
1. "Don't Ever Change" – 04:00
2. "Make It Fit" – 04:22
3. "Lil' Lou" – 03:33
4. "Slam" – 03:34
5. "Bounce Back" – 03:25

== Charts ==
Chart performance for Greatest Hits
Chart (2023)	Peak position
Scottish Albums (OCC)	12
UK Albums (OCC)	11
UK Independent Albums (OCC)	3
