= Heavy Love (Louise album) =

2020 album released by Louise

Studio album by Louise
- Released: 17 January 2020
- Genre: Funk; gospel; R&B
- Length: 40:31
- Label: Lil Lou Records Ltd; Warner
- Producer: Oliver & Samsson; Freedo; Jack Patterson; Mark Ralph; Michael Angelo; Ash Howes

Louise chronology
| Finest Moments (2002) | Heavy Love (2020) | Greatest Hits (2023) |

Singles from Heavy Love
- 1. "Stretch" Released: 26 March 2019; 2. "Lead Me On" Released: 3 July 2019; 3. "Breaking Back Together" Released: 6 September 2019; 4. "Not the Same" Released: 11 October 2019; 5. "Hurt" Released: 1 January 2020

Professional ratings
Review scores
| Source | Rating |
|---|---|
| Culture Fix UK | 5/5 stars |

Heavy Love is the fourth studio album by English singer Louise. It was released on 17 January 2020 by Lil Lou Records Ltd, under partnership with Warner. The album includes contributions from Clean Bandit, Eg White, Raye, Karen Poole and Sinéad Harnett.

== Promotion ==
The album was preceded by the single "Stretch", released on 26 March 2019. "Lead Me On" was released on 4 July 2019 as the album's second single, receiving its premiere on BBC Radio 2. Louise followed this in September 2019 with the album's third single, "Breaking Back Together". "Not the Same" was released as the fourth single alongside a lyric video. The track reached BBC Radio 2's C-List. "Hurt" was released as the fifth single with a 'Single Version', with the track being added BBC Radio 2's A-List.

On 4 September 2019, it was announced that the album would be postponed from 18 October 2019 to 17 January 2020, with Louise citing the promotional schedule for 9 to 5: The Musical as the reason for the delayed release.

== Chart performance ==
The album debuted at number 11 on the UK Albums Chart on the issue dated 24 January 2020.

== Reception ==
Culture Fix UK acclaimed Louise as a "formidable force" and called Heavy Love a welcome return of "tremendous proportions". In a five-star review, they lauded her vocals, songwriting and the album's production, concluding that "Heavy Love presents an artist at the top of their game – stylistically ambitious in its musical scope, refreshingly honest in its songwriting and produced with an immaculate polish. Heavy Love is pop music at its finest and a delightful welcome back to Louise. It is a challenge to imagine any other pop album being quite this good in 2020."

== Track listing ==
Heavy Love – Standard edition
| No. | Title | Writer(s) | Producer(s) | Length |
|---|---|---|---|---|
| 1. | "Stretch" | Louise Redknapp; Oliver Lundstorm; Dotter; John Fransson; Fredrik Samsson; Jonathan Eyden | Oliver & Samsson | 3:23 |
| 2. | "Lead Me On" | Redknapp; Chloe Latimer; Jack Patterson; Samuel Romans | Freedo; Patterson; Mark Ralph | 3:43 |
| 3. | "Breaking Back Together" | Redknapp; Sinead Harnett; Michael Angelo; Adam Argyle | Angelo; Ash Howes^{[a]} | 3:08 |
| 4. | "Not the Same" | Redknapp; Skylar Adams; Daniel Shah | Skylar Adams | 2:57 |
| 5. | "Small Talk" | Redknapp; Georgia Overton; Iain Farquharson; Thomas Meredith | Meredith | 3:03 |
| 6. | "Hurt" | Redknapp; Karen Poole; Chiara Hunter; Argyle | Jacob Manson | 3:16 |
| 7. | "Hammer" | Redknapp; Hunter; Timothy Deal; Hannah Robinson | Hight | 3:43 |
| 8. | "Just a Minute" | Redknapp; Adams; Shah | Adams, Howes | 2:51 |
| 9. | "Wonder Woman" | Joanna Levesque; Brandi Flores; Joshua Monroy | Josh Monroy | 4:10 |
| 10. | "Hands on the Sink" | Rachel Keen; Francis White; Fred Cox | Eg White, Fred Cox | 3:31 |
| 11. | "Straight to My Heart" | Alice Penrose; James Norton; Gregory Bonnick; Hayden Chapman | LDN Noise; Phil Cook; Howes^{[a]} | 3:34 |
| 12. | "Wrong" | Redknapp; Lauren Aquilina; Andrew Jackson; Argyle | Steve Anderson | 3:12 |
| Total length: | | | | 40:31 |

Heavy Love – Deluxe edition
| No. | Title | Writer(s) | Producer(s) | Length |
|---|---|---|---|---|
| 11. | "Give You Up" | Redknapp; Harnett; Farquharson; Philip Cook | Phil Cook | 3:53 |
| 12. | "Straight to My Heart" | Penrose; Norton; Bonnick; Chapman | LDN Noise; Cook; Howes^{[a]} | 3:34 |
| 13. | "Villain" | Redknapp; Thomas Dutton; Robinson; Josef Page | Page | 3:07 |
| 14. | "Settle for Nothing" | Redknapp; Shah; Adams | Adams; Howes^{[a]} | 3:10 |
| 15. | "Wrong" | Redknapp; Aquilina; Jackson; Argyle | Anderson | 3:12 |
| Total length: | | | | 50:41 |

== Charts ==
Chart performance for Heavy Love
| Chart (2020) | Peak position |
|---|---|
| Scottish Albums (OCC) | 6 |
| UK Albums (OCC) | 11 |
| UK Independent Albums (OCC) | 2 |

== Heavy Love Tour ==
Dates:

The Heavy Love Tour began in Southampton on 12 March 2020, visiting the following venues:

- 12 March 2020: 1865, Southampton
- 14 March 2020: Tramshed, Cardiff
- 15 March 2020: SWX, Bristol
- 16 March 2020: O2 Institute, Birmingham

Postponed dates

The following dates were announced as indefinitely postponed on 17 March 2020 due to the COVID-19 pandemic:

- 18 March 2020: Rock City, Nottingham
- 19 March 2020: O2 Ritz, Manchester
- 21 March 2020: Beckett Student Union, Leeds
- 22 March 2020: SWG3, Glasgow
- 24 March 2020: Boiler Shop, Newcastle
- 25 March 2020: Cambridge Junction, Cambridge
- 26 March 2020: Shepherd's Bush Empire, London

Setlist

The setlist on 12 March:

1. "Hammer"
2. "In Walked Love" (new mix by Steve Anderson)
3. "Stretch" (Initial Talk Remix)
4. "2 Faced"
5. "Stay" (Eternal song), including an interpolation of "Sweet Love" by Anita Baker
6. "Villain"
7. "Escapade" (Janet Jackson cover)
8. "Lead Me On"
9. "Stuck in the Middle with You"
10. "Straight to My Heart"
11. "Naked" (new mix by Steve Anderson)
12. "Settle for Nothing"
13. "So Good (Eternal song)
14. "Oh Baby I..." (Eternal song)
15. "Just a Step from Heaven" (Eternal song)
16. "Light of My Life" (Piano and Vocal Mix)
17. "Not the Same"
18. "Arms Around the World" (new mix by Steve Anderson)

Encore:

1. "Wrong"
2. "Hurt"
3. "The Boss" (Diana Ross cover)
4. "Let's Go Round Again", including an interpolation of "One More Time" by Daft Punk
