= Ferguslie Park =

Suburb of Paisley, Renfrewshire, Scotland

Coordinates: 55.8486°N 4.4547°W

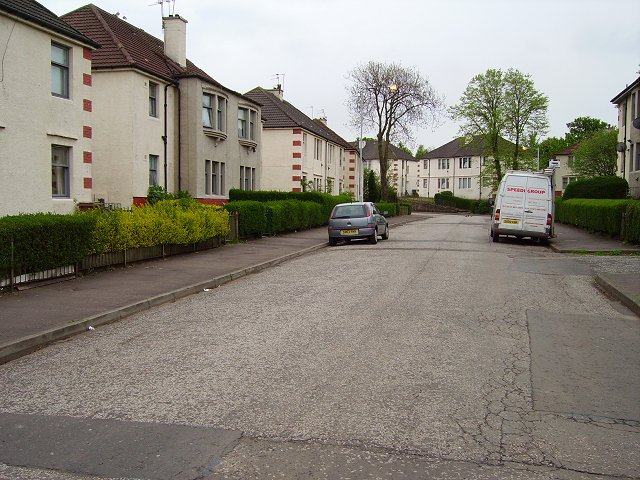
Ferguslie Park

Ferguslie Park is a residential suburb at the north-west extremity of Paisley in Renfrewshire, Scotland. It is bordered by the town of Linwood to the west and Glasgow Airport to the north.

== History ==
Ferguslie has origins dating back to the sixteenth century, and was the site of a large estate associated with the monks based at Paisley. The modern town, however, was born in the 1850s around an iron-stone mining settlement known as Inkerman. At its closure, the town was demolished and its residents moved to Ferguslie or nearby Elderslie.

Its main form was gained following the Housing Act of 1949.

It was hit particularly hard by the closure of traditional industries particularly based in nearby Linwood in the late-1970s and early-1980s. As a consequence, and also due to its isolated position separated from Paisley and other towns by railway lines and other transport networks; it has suffered a large degree of social exclusion.

In 2006, the Scottish Executive named it as one of Scotland's most deprived communities. This information was based on paperwork dating back to 1996.

To the east, St Mirren F.C., the local team of the town of Paisley who play in the Scottish Premiership, moved in January 2009 from their traditional Love Street home some 600 m away from a new all-seater stadium on vacant ground near the current St. James Station. This involved selling Love Street to a supermarket chain and it was given planning permission by Renfrewshire Council in 2005 for both the new stadium and supermarket plans.

In 2012 the "Scottish Index of Multiple Deprivation" analysis by the Scottish Government again identified Ferguslie Park as the most deprived area in Scotland. There was a slight improvement in 2019, with the community the third-most deprived area, almost four decades after the Linwood car manufacturing plant was closed. (The term "deprivation" refers not only to low income according to the BBC, but may also include "fewer resources and opportunities, for example in health and education".) A BBC report states that the most significant problem for the Council was the "half-abandoned Tannahill scheme", an area with derelict homes, but regeneration funding of £6M had already been scheduled; it would be used to build just over a hundred affordable houses.

== Location and transport ==
Ferguslie Park is at the north-west extremity of Paisley in Renfrewshire, Scotland. It is bordered by the town of Linwood to the west and Glasgow Airport to the north. To the North the Inverclyde-to-Glasgow Railway line separates the residential area from the industrial areas to the North East of Ferguslie Park. Paisley St James railway station, is located on the line near Greenhill Road. The Glasgow Airport Rail Link will see the current station close and move closer to the centre of Ferguslie Park, as the rail link to the airport will require a junction where the station is located.

St James's Park, known locally as the Racecourse, a recreation ground to the south of the M8, is a popular football venue for amateur teams. This area has avoided many of the problems of Ferguslie Park and is still fairly well used, with many businesses, in particular long stay car parks for the nearby airport.

2 bus services run through the area, both operated by operator McGill’s. One (Route 7/7A) links the area to the Phoenix Centre and Paisley Town Centre, and the other (Route 264) operates a similar route on an evening service.

== Notable people ==
- Joe Egan and Gerry Rafferty (singer/songwriters) of the band Stealers Wheel. In 1974 Stealers Wheel, whose joint founders Gerry Rafferty and Joe Egan were both from Paisley, named their second album after the estate.
- Kelly Marie (singer/songwriter)
- John Byrne (artist and playwright)
- Sandra Osborne (politician and former MP for Ayr Carrick & Cumnock)
- John Keenan (Roman Catholic Bishop of Paisley)
