= Straight to My Heart =

Straight to My Heart may refer to:

- "Straight to My Heart", a song by English singer Sting from his 1987 album ...Nothing Like the Sun
- "Straight to My Heart", a song by English singer Louise from her 2020 album Heavy Love
