= Pandora's Kiss / Don't Give Up =

2003 single by Louise Redknapp

"Pandora's Kiss" / "Don't Give Up"

Single by Louise
- Released: 15 September 2003
- Length: 3:12 ("Pandora's Kiss"); 3:29 ("Don't Give Up")
- Label: Positive
- Songwriters: Sylvia Bennett-Smith, Reed Vertelney, Robbie Neville ("Pandora's Kiss"); Roger Greenaway, Peter Gordeno, Howard New, Rick Blaskey ("Don't Give Up")
- Producers: Sylvia Bennett-Smith, Reed Vertelney, Robbie Neville ("Pandora's Kiss"); Three Thirty ("Don't Give Up")

Louise singles chronology
"Stuck in the Middle with You" (2001)	"Pandora's Kiss" / "Don't Give Up" (2003)	"Stretch" (2019)

"Pandora's Kiss" and "Don't Give Up" are two songs by English singer Louise. They were released as a double A-sided single on 15 September 2003 as the intended lead single from her fourth studio album; however, the album was later shelved, resulting in "Pandora's Kiss" / "Don't Give Up" being a standalone single. The single was also released to raise money for the Tickled Pink campaign for Breast Cancer Care. Listeners noted that the chorus of "Don't Give Up" strongly resembles Asda's commercial marketing jingle; Asda admitted that the same composer had written it. It was Louise's last single to be released until 2019's "Stretch."

The double A-side debuted and peaked at number five on the UK Singles Chart, making it her ninth top ten single. It was re-released in 2019, being available on music download outlets and streaming to coincide with the release of Louise's fourth studio album, Heavy Love (2020). According to the Official Charts Company, "Pandora's Kiss" is Louise's 11th-highest-selling single in the UK. "Don't Give Up" was available only in Asda stores. The video for "Pandora's Kiss" was directed by Trudy Bellinger. "Pandora's Kiss" was included on Louise's third greatest hits album, Greatest Hits (2023).

== Chart performance ==
"Pandora's Kiss" / "Don't Give Up" debuted and peaked at number five on the UK Singles Chart, becoming Louise's ninth top ten single, lasting five weeks in the top 100. It became the 135th best-selling single in the UK in 2003. To date, it is Louise's 11th highest-selling single in the country. The double A-side also debuted and peaked at number five on the Scottish Singles Chart. It peaked at number 20 on the Eurochart Hot 100.

== Music video ==
A music video for "Pandora's Kiss" was directed by Trudy Bellinger and filmed on 24 July 2003 at Asylum Studios, London. The video was released on a DVD single.

The video begins with a gang of men finding a metal box in the middle of an alleyway. One of the men kicks the box, revealing that Louise is inside the box, as it represents Pandora's box. Determined to discover what is inside the box, the gang kicks and thrashes the box, which causes Louise to be thrown around inside. During the second verse, Louise enters another room inside the box where she dances in front of a wall of television screens. During the final chorus, Louise enters another room where she performs with a band, whilst one of the men repeatedly stabs the box with a tool, which Louise narrowly avoids. The video ends with one of the men peeling off one side of the box, to which a red light shoots out.

== Track listings ==
UK CD1

1. "Pandora's Kiss" (radio edit) – 3:12
2. "Don't Give Up" (radio edit) – 3:29
3. "Pandora's Kiss" (Goldtrix Freaktronic vocal mix) – 7:37

UK CD2

1. "Don't Give Up" (radio edit) – 3:29
2. "Pandora's Kiss" (radio edit) – 3:12
3. "Pandora's Kiss" (D-Bop mix) – 7:37

UK DVD single

1. "Pandora's Kiss" (the video) – 3:28
2. Behind the scenes on the video – 1:57
3. "Pandora's Kiss" (radio edit) – 3:12
4. "Don't Give Up" (radio edit) – 3:29
5. Photo gallery

== Charts ==
=== Weekly charts ===
Weekly chart performance for "Pandora's Kiss" / "Don't Give Up"
Chart (2003–2004)	Peak position
Europe (Eurochart Hot 100)	20
Scottish Singles Sales (Official Charts)	5
UK Singles (Official Charts)	5
UK Indie (Official Charts)	15

=== Year-end charts ===
Year-end chart performance for "Pandora's Kiss" / "Don't Give Up"
Chart (2003)	Position
UK Singles (OCC)	135
