= Stealers Wheel (album) =

Studio album by Stealers Wheel
- Released: 17 November 1972
- Recorded: Apple Studio, London
- Genre: Rock; folk rock
- Length: 34:12
- Label: A&M
- Producer: Jerry Leiber, Mike Stoller

Stealers Wheel chronology
Stealers Wheel (1972)	Ferguslie Park (1973)

Singles from Stealers Wheel
- 1. "Late Again" Released: 1972; 2. "You Put Something Better Inside Me" Released: 1972; 3. "Stuck in the Middle with You" Released: April 27, 1973

Professional ratings
Review scores
Source	Rating
AllMusic	4/5 stars
Christgau's Record Guide	B
Encyclopedia of Popular Music	5/5 stars

Stealers Wheel is the debut studio album by Scottish folk rock band Stealers Wheel. It was released on 17 November 1972 by A&M Records. The album was a critical and commercial success, reaching No. 50 in the US Billboard 200 album chart, with their hit single "Stuck in the Middle with You" coming from the album.

The cover painting is by John Patrick Byrne. The words "Stealers Wheel" are embedded ten times in the design, in addition to the large lettering in the bottom left-hand corner (eleven in total). The album has each member of the band's heads on different animals (clockwise from top left: Rod Coombes as a zebra, Paul Pilnick as a bird, Tony Williams as a rabbit, Joe Egan as a lion, and Gerry Rafferty as a tiger).

== Track listing ==
No.	Title	Writer(s)	Length
1.	"Late Again"	Joe Egan, Gerry Rafferty	3:16
2.	"Stuck in the Middle with You"	Egan, Rafferty	3:25
3.	"Another Meaning"	Egan	3:01
4.	"I Get By"	Egan	3:16
5.	"Outside Looking In"	Rafferty	3:54
6.	"Johnny's Song"	Rafferty	3:45
7.	"Next to Me"	Egan, Rafferty	3:37
8.	"José"	Egan	3:23
9.	"Gets So Lonely"	Egan	2:57
10.	"You Put Something Better Inside Me"	Egan, Rafferty	3:50

== Personnel ==
=== Stealers Wheel ===
- Gerry Rafferty - guitar, lead vocals
- Joe Egan - keyboards, guitar, lead vocals
- Paul Pilnick - lead guitar, rhythm guitar (on "I Get By")
- Tony Williams - bass
- Rod Coombes - drums

with:

- Iain Campbell - bass
- Luther Grosvenor - lap steel guitar (on "Stuck In The Middle With You"), lead guitar (on "I Get By"), acoustic guitar, harmony and backing vocals (on "Late Again")
- (uncredited - saxophone)

=== Production ===
- Geoff Emerick, John Mills - engineering. The album went on to receive the European Edison Award for recording excellence.

== Charts ==
Chart (1973)	Peak position
Australia (Kent Music Report)	44
