= Right or Wrong (Stealers Wheel album) =

Studio album by Stealers Wheel
- Released: March 1975
- Genre: Folk rock
- Length: 37:34
- Label: A&M
- Producer: Mentor Williams

Stealers Wheel chronology
Ferguslie Park (1973)	Right or Wrong (1975)	Stuck in the Middle with You: The Best of Stealers Wheel (1978)

Singles from Right or Wrong
- 1. "Right or Wrong" Released: February 1975; 2. "Found My Way to You" Released: May 1975

Right or Wrong is the third and final studio album by Scottish folk rock/rock band Stealers Wheel released in March 1975, by A&M Records.

== Critical reception ==
Professional ratings
Review scores
Source	Rating
AllMusic	3/5 stars
The Encyclopedia of Popular Music	4/5 stars
MusicHound	4/5 stars

In a Cashbox magazine review, the writers of the magazine wrote Gerry Rafferty and Joe Egan "show enormous musical diversity in their lyrics and music in this album". Record World stated it is "comprised predominantly of soft-paced pleasers ideal for both FM and pop play". Billboard magazine states Egan and Rafferty "have surrounded themselves with a more 'commercial' backdrop, using strings and an overall more electric backup than on prior efforts", noting it is "more likely to appeal to the average consumer".

The Los Angeles Times writer Steve Pond believed it specialized in a "tight, dynamic sound highlighted by unique harmonies and the effective use of acoustic and rhythm guitars.", calling it a disc that "also draws attention to a continuing problem" in the group's work: The lack of adequate material", concluding by stating that the "lack of extended melodic and notable lyrics causes most of these songs to be mostly forgettable". In a review of the album for Evening Despatch, Martin Lilleker believed it to be their best album, noting that the songs "have a magic of their own and the harmonies are among the most distinctive around." The North County Times writers thought it to be too polished, stating it has "syrupy strings in the worst places", adding that the title track "doesn't cut it" and that the "only chance the boys have with this near-turkey" are "Found My Way to You" or "Go as You Please", encouraging Sean Egan and Gerry Rafferty to get a new producer. Dana Sue Jackson wrote in Detroit Free Press that Stealers Wheel attempts to "aim for a carefree mood", noting that the percussion is "adaptive" and that the percussion keeps it moving "at a rollicking and catchy pace", she highlights "Found My Way to You" and the title track as the album's best songs, believing that "Let Yourself Go" sounds like the Beatles during the middle part of their career. In the Trenton Times, Alan Edwards said the album had a "nasal, downbeat Beatles style."

== Track listing ==
All tracks are written by Joe Egan and Gerry Rafferty except "Don't Get Me Wrong" written solely by Rafferty.

Side one
No.	Title	Length
1.	"Benediction"	4:48
2.	"Found My Way to You"	3:40
3.	"This Morning"	3:28
4.	"Let Yourself Go"	3:27
5.	"Home from Home"	3:40

Side two
No.	Title	Length
1.	"Go as You Please"	3:42
2.	"Wishbone"	3:28
3.	"Don't Get Me Wrong"	3:14
4.	"Monday Morning"	3:25
5.	"Right or Wrong"	4:42
Total length:		37:34

== Personnel ==
Credits adapted from AllMusic and Barnes & Noble:

Stealers Wheel

- Joe Egan – vocals, keyboards, composer
- Gerry Rafferty – guitar, vocals, composer

Additional musicians

- Josephine (surname unknown) – piano, guitar, clarinet, keyboards
- Geraldine (surname unknown) – guitar, clarinet, keyboards
- Chris Neill – harp, harmonica
- Chris Mercer – saxophone
- Hugh Burns – guitar
- Andrew Steele – drums, percussion
- Dave Wintour – bass
- Bernie Holland – guitar
- David Briggs – piano, keyboards

Production

- Mentor Williams – producer
- Phil McDonald – engineer
- Roger Stowell – photography
- Walter Egan – composer
- Jon Kirkman – liner notes
