= Star (Stealers Wheel song) =

Single by Stealers Wheel

from the album Ferguslie Park
- B-side: "What More Could You Want"
- Released: November 1973
- Genre: Pop rock
- Length: 2:58
- Label: A&M
- Songwriter: Joe Egan
- Producer: Jerry Leiber, Mike Stoller

Stealers Wheel singles chronology
| "Everyone's Agreed That Everything Will Turn Out Fine" (1973) | "Star" (1973) | "You Put Something Better Inside of Me" (1974) |

Official audio
- "Star" on YouTube

"Star" is a song written by Joe Egan and performed by Scottish folk rock/rock band Stealers Wheel. In 1974, it reached No.6 on the U.S. Adult Contemporary chart, No.12 on the Canadian pop chart, No.25 on the UK Singles Chart, and No.29 on the U.S. pop chart. It was featured on the band's 1973 album Ferguslie Park.

The song was produced by Jerry Leiber and Mike Stoller.

== Charts ==
| Chart (1974) | Peak position |
|---|---|
| Australia (Kent Music Report) | 67 |
| New Zealand (Listener) | 11 |
| United Kingdom (Official Charts Company) | 25 |
| US Billboard Easy Listening | 6 |
| US Billboard Hot 100 | 29 |
