= Confessions (Louise album) =

- Standard cover

Studio album by Louise
- Released: 23 May 2025
- Genres: Dance-pop; nu-disco; funk
- Length: 29:48
- Label: Lil Lou
- Producers: Jon Shave; Tre Jean-Marie; Pete Hammerton; Will Simms; Parx; Anthony Whiting; Phillips

Louise chronology
Greatest Hits (2023)	Confessions (2025)

Singles from Confessions
- 1. "Confession" Released: 13 February 2025; 2. "Borderline" Released: 10 April 2025; 3. "Only Dancer" Released: 1 August 2025

Confessions is the fifth studio album by English singer Louise. It was released on 23 May 2025 by Lil Lou Records. Its release is preceded by the singles "Confession", "Love Me More", and "Borderline". Working with a variety of collaborators, the project includes contributions from Jon Shave, Anya Jones, Karen Poole, Tre Jean-Marie, MNEK, Miranda Cooper and Hannah Robinson.

== Background and composition ==
Work on Confessions began over a year before release. The deluxe edition's bonus tracks, "Diamonds" and "L.U.V", were some of the first written, and the former of the two cemented some of the writers and producers Redknapp would work with on the album. According to the singer, "Confession" was the song that set the style and tone for the rest of the record. The process of recording was guided by a desire to create modern music unrestricted by a need to appeal to radio stations. Louise worked with, in her own words, "anyone who's made hit music in the last four or five years" to create Confessions, among them Jon Shave, MNEK, Wayne Hector, Anya Jones and others. The final, mastered version was delivered to Redknapp around January 2025.

Confessions is an album of dance-pop, nu-disco and funk music where "synths, strings, and house-inspired beats" are prominent.

== Promotion ==
=== Singles ===
On 13 February 2025, Louise released "Confession", the album's lead single; it debuted at number 75 on the UK Singles Downloads Chart, and at number 81 on the UK Singles Sales Chart, on 21 February 2025. A promotional single, "Love Me More", was released on 21 March 2025. It debuted and peaked at number 83 on the UK Singles Downloads Chart, and at number 88 on the UK Singles Sales Chart. "Borderline" was released as the second single on 10 April 2025. No official music videos were released by Louise to promote the album's singles. The album's third single, "Only Dancer", was released 1 August 2025.

== Commercial performance ==
In the United Kingdom, Confessions was a minor success. On 30 May 2025, the album debuted at number 8 selling 6,419 copies on the UK Albums Chart Top 100, becoming Louise's first album since 1997's Woman in Me, to reach the Top 10; additionally, the album debuted at number 4 on the UK Albums Sales Chart, number 2 on the Albums Downloads Chart, number 8 on the Vinyl component chart, number 1 on the cassette Chart and number 4 on the Independent Albums Chart. Confessions went on to spend two weeks on the UK Albums Sales chart, and three weeks on the UK Albums Downloads chart.

== Reception ==
The album was received positively upon release. Bradley Stern of MuuMuse named it "an all-killer, no-skips affair" and even "one of the best pop albums of 2025". Writing for The Yorkshire Times, Jeremy Williams-Chalmers called it a "well-written, well-produced and strikingly insightful pop rocket".

== Track listing ==
Standard edition
No.	Title	Writer(s)	Producer(s)	Length
1.	"Confession"	Louise Redknapp; Jon Shave; Anya Jones; Wayne Hector	Shave	3:21
2.	"Borderline"	Tre Jean-Marie; Karen Poole; Georgia Ku	Jean-Marie	2:40
3.	"Manifesting"	Redknapp; Shave; Jones	Shave	2:57
4.	"It Ain't Love"	Poole; Pete Hammerton; Will Simms; Nonô	Hammerton; Simms	2:26
5.	"Only Dancer"	Hannah Robinson; Alex Cramp; Aidan Clancy; Dylan Walsh	Parx	3:34
6.	"Follow Me"	Cramp; Leah Jack; Theodoulos Doukanaris	Parx	2:49
7.	"Get Into It"	Redknapp; Shave; Jones; Emily Phillips; Sam Harper	Shave	3:02
8.	"Love Me More"	Redknapp; Shave; Jones; Miranda Cooper; Harper	Shave	2:52
9.	"Don't Kill My Vibe"	Redknapp; Shave; Jones	Shave	3:33
10.	"Just Like That"	Redknapp; Shave; Jones; Uzo Emenike	Shave	2:34
Total length:				29:48

Deluxe edition
No.	Title	Writer(s)	Producer(s)	Length
11.	"L.U.V"	Redknapp; Anthony Whiting; Phillips	Whiting	2:53
12.	"Diamonds"	Redknapp; Shave; Phillips; Harper	Shave	2:22
Total length:				35:03

Super deluxe edition
No.	Title	Writer(s)	Producer(s)	Length
12.	"Release"	Redknapp; Whiting; Bryn Christopher; Phillips; Harper	Whiting	2:34
13.	"Crush"	Redknapp; Whiting; Phillips; Shave; Harper	Whiting; Shave	2:47
14.	"Diamonds"	Redknapp; Shave; Phillips; Harper	Shave	2:22
Total length:				40:24

Notes

- "Get Into It" contains a sample of "Throb", performed by Janet Jackson.
- During the week of release, multiple other editions of the album were released:
  - A "deluxe instrumental" edition featuring instrumental versions of the standard 10 tracks sequenced right after the originals
  - An extended edition with extended mixes of the standard set of songs
  - A "deluxe acapella" edition featuring a capella versions of all 14 songs, including bonus tracks
  - A "deluxe continuous mix edition" with an 11th track, the full deluxe album made into one continuous mix.
  - An Amazon Music exclusive "audio commentary edition" with each of the 10 standard tracks preceded by short commentary from the singer.

== Personnel ==
Credits adapted from the album's liner notes.

- Louise Redknapp – vocals (all tracks), backing vocals (tracks 3, 11, 12)
- John Webber – mastering
- Paul Norris – mixing (track 1)
- Joshua Ager – mixing (tracks 2–12)
- Jon Shave – all instruments (tracks 1, 3, 7–10, 12)
- Anya Jones – backing vocals (tracks 1, 3, 8–10)
- Reiad Chibah – string arrangement, additional strings (tracks 1, 3)
- Everton Nelson – violins (tracks 1, 3)
- Richard George – violins (tracks 1, 3)
- Emil Chakalov – violins (tracks 1, 3)
- Natalia Bonner – violins (tracks 1, 3)
- Marianne Haynes – violins (tracks 1, 3)
- Alison Dods – violins (tracks 1, 3)
- Anna de Bruin – violins (tracks 1, 3)
- Lucy Jeal – violins (tracks 1, 3)
- Oliver Langford – violins (tracks 1, 3)
- Katherine Chibah – additional strings (tracks 1, 3)
- Kate Musker – additional strings (tracks 1, 3)
- Ian Burdge – additional strings (tracks 1, 3)
- Chris Worsey – additional strings (tracks 1, 3)
- Lou Dearsley – additional strings (tracks 1, 3)
- Tre Jean-Marie – all instruments (track 2)
- Pete Hammerton – all instruments (track 4)
- Will Simms – all instruments (track 4)
- Parx – all instruments (tracks 5, 6)
- Sam Harper – backing vocals (tracks 7, 11, 12)
- Anthony Whiting – all instruments (track 11)
- Oscar J. Ryan – photography
- Lewis Shaw – design

== Charts ==
Chart performance for Confessions
Chart (2025)	Peak position
Belgian Albums (Ultratop Wallonia)	167
Scottish Albums (Official Charts)	7
UK Albums (Official Charts)	8
UK Independent Albums (Official Charts)	4
