= Ferguslie Park (album) =

Studio album by Stealers Wheel
- Released: 1973
- Length: 40:17
- Label: A&M
- Producers: Jerry Leiber, Mike Stoller

Stealers Wheel chronology
Stealers Wheel (1972)	Ferguslie Park (1973)	Right or Wrong (1975)

Singles from Ferguslie Park
- 1. "Everyone's Agreed That Everything Will Turn Out Fine" Released: 1973; 2. "Star" Released: 1973

Professional ratings
Review scores
Source	Rating
AllMusic	3.5/5 stars
Christgau's Record Guide	C+
Encyclopedia of Popular Music	5/5 stars

Ferguslie Park is the second album by the Scottish rock band Stealers Wheel, released in 1973.

== Track listing ==
No.	Title	Writer(s)	Length
1.	"Good Businessman"	Joe Egan, Gerry Rafferty	4:12
2.	"Star"	Egan	2:58
3.	"Wheelin'"	Egan, Rafferty	3:51
4.	"Waltz (You Know It Makes Sense)"	Egan	2:53
5.	"What More Could You Want"	Rafferty	3:06
6.	"Over My Head"	Rafferty	3:58
7.	"Blind Faith"	Egan, Rafferty	2:58
8.	"Nothing's Gonna Change My Mind"	Egan	4:01
9.	"Steamboat Row"	Rafferty	2:50
10.	"Back On My Feet Again"	Egan	2:36
11.	"Who Cares"	Rafferty	3:44
12.	"Everyone's Agreed That Everything Will Turn Out Fine*"	Egan, Rafferty	3:10

- - Note: The album version features a chugging rhythm and wah-wah guitar. The single release is a different recording, with handclaps.

== Personnel ==
Sources:

- Gerry Rafferty – vocals, acoustic and electric guitars, mandolin, piano, kazoo
- Joe Egan – vocals, piano, organ, acoustic guitar, kazoo
- Peter Robinson – acoustic piano, electric piano, Hammond organ, pipe organ, synthesizers, chimes
- Gary Taylor – bass guitar, Minimoog synthesizer
- Joe Jammer – electric guitar
- Andy Steele – drums, tambourine, congas, triangle, chimes, maracas, wood blocks, cowbell, claves, jawbones
- Bernie Holland – electric guitar
- Chris Neale – harmonica
- Corky Hale – harp
- Steve Gregory – tenor saxophone
- Chris Mercer – tenor saxophone
- Mike Stoller – electric harpsichord, horn arrangements, producer
- Richard Anthony Hewson – string arrangements

=== Technical ===
- Phill Brown – engineer
- Jerry Leiber – producer
- John Byrne – cover artwork
