= Changing Faces =

Changing Faces may refer to:

- Changing Faces (charity), a British charity which works in the area of disfigurement
- Changing Faces (group), a United States R&B duo
  - Changing Faces (Changing Faces album)
- Changing Faces (Bros album)
- Changing Faces – The Very Best of 10cc and Godley & Creme, compilation album
- Changing Faces – The Best of Louise, a 2001 compilation album
- "Changing Faces", television episode of All That featuring the group
