= Stealers Wheel =

Scottish rock band

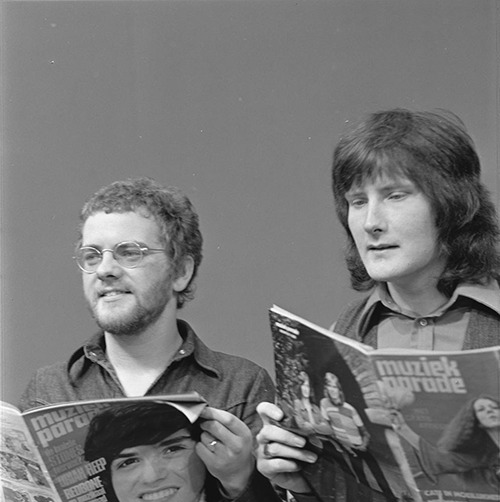
- Joe Egan (left) and Gerry Rafferty (right) in 1973

Background information
- Origin: Paisley, Renfrewshire, Scotland
- Genres: Pop rock, folk rock
- Years active: 1972–1975, 2008
- Label: A&M
- Past members: Joe Egan; Gerry Rafferty; Rod Coombes; Paul Pilnick; Tony Williams; Luther Grosvenor; DeLisle Harper; Tony Mitchell; Roger Brown; Iain Campbell; Rab Noakes

Stealers Wheel were a Scottish folk rock band formed in 1972 in Paisley, Scotland, by former school friends Joe Egan and Gerry Rafferty. Their best-known hit is "Stuck in the Middle with You". The band broke up in 1975 and re-formed briefly in 2008.

== Biography ==
Egan and Rafferty met as teenagers in Paisley, and became the core of Stealers Wheel. They were initially joined by Roger Brown (guitar), Rab Noakes (guitar, vocals) and Iain Campbell (bass) in 1972. By the time the band was signed to A&M Records later that year, however, Brown, Noakes and Campbell had been replaced by Paul Pilnick (lead guitar), Tony Williams (bass) and Rod Coombes (drums).

This second line-up recorded Stealers Wheel (October 1972), produced by American songwriters and producers Leiber & Stoller, and it was a critical and commercial success, reaching No. 50 in the US Billboard 200 album chart, with their hit single "Stuck in the Middle with You" coming from the album. On 7 November 1972 the band appeared on BBC 2's The Old Grey Whistle Test, performing "I Get By" and "Late Again".

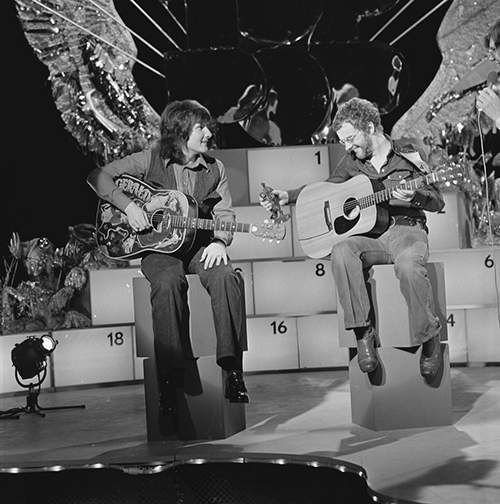
Stealers Wheel appearing on TopPop in 1973

By the time the first album was released, Rafferty had left the band; Luther Grosvenor filled in for him on tour. Tony Williams also left shortly afterwards, and DeLisle Harper joined on bass for the tour.

"Stuck in the Middle with You" reached No. 6 in the US Billboard Hot 100 and No. 8 in the UK Singles Chart in 1973, selling over one million copies worldwide, and was awarded a gold disc. With the album also selling well, Rafferty was persuaded to return. However, Grosvenor, Coombes, Pilnick and Harper all left the band. The band then officially became a duo with various backing musicians on guitar, bass and drums.

Later in 1973, the single "Everyone's Agreed That Everything Will Turn Out Fine" had modest chart success, and in 1974, the single "Star" reached the top 30 of both the UK and US charts. Reviewing the single "Star", David Middleton at PopRockNation wrote:

A catchy shuffle of the Lennonesque variety, 'Star' is 3 minutes of pure shimmering acoustic-guitar pop loveliness and honey-throated vocal harmonies, punctuated with spikes of harmonica, kazoo, woodblock, and bawdy barrelhouse piano.

A second album, Ferguslie Park, was released in 1973, with the duo supported by nine musicians. The album, named after an area of Paisley, just barely reached the US Billboard 200 and was a commercial failure. With increasing tensions between Egan and Rafferty, and with Leiber & Stoller also having business problems, Stealers Wheel went on a year and a half hiatus.

By the time their third and final album Right or Wrong was released in 1975, they had completely disbanded. Because of disagreements and managerial problems, it was produced by Mentor Williams.

In 1978 A&M released the compilation album Gerry Rafferty and Joe Egan — Stuck in the Middle with You (The Best of Stealers Wheel).

Another compilation album, Best of Stealers Wheel, was released in 1990.

In 1992 director Quentin Tarantino used the track "Stuck in the Middle with You" on the soundtrack of his debut film Reservoir Dogs, in which it was used in the iconic scene involving the torture of a police officer. And a dance version of "Stuck in the Middle with You" was a UK top 10 hit for Louise in September 2001, with a music video that drew heavily on the original song's appearance in Reservoir Dogs.

All three albums had been unavailable for many years, though in 2004 and 2005 the British independent record label Lemon Recordings, of Cherry Red, re-released them using vinyl sources rather than tapes.

After being contacted by iTunes and K-tel in California, Tony Williams briefly re-formed Stealers Wheel in Blackpool in 2008 with Rod Coombes and Paul Pilnick, together with close friend Tony Mitchell.

On 10 November 2008 they started filming a music video for a re-recording of "Stuck in the Middle" on the Fylde coast. They also began writing new songs although they had no plans to tour, and disbanded again.

Gerry Rafferty died on 4 January 2011 of liver failure.

In early 2016, independent record label Intervention Records reissued both Stealers Wheel and Ferguslie Park on 180-gram vinyl.

In 2017 Caroline reissued all three in a mini-boxed set with three BBC bonus tracks on the first album. All were remastered.

Rab Noakes died on 11 November 2022, at the age of 75.

Joe Egan died on 6 July 2024 at the age of 77.

== Band members ==
- Joe Egan – lead and backing vocals, keyboards, rhythm guitar (1972–1975; died 2024)
- Gerry Rafferty – lead vocals, rhythm guitar, keyboards (1972, 1973–1975; died 2011)
- Paul Pilnick – lead guitar (1972–1973, 2008; died 2021)
- Tony Williams – bass (1972–1973, 2008)
- Rod Coombes – drums (1972–1973, 2008)
- Luther Grosvenor – lead and backing vocals, guitar, lap steel guitar (1973)
- DeLisle Harper – bass (1973)
- Tony Mitchell – lead vocals, rhythm guitar (2008)

== Discography ==
=== Albums ===
Year	Title	Peak chart positions		
Year	Title	AUS	CAN	US
1972	Stealers Wheel	44	25	50
1973	Ferguslie Park	—	—	181
1975	Right or Wrong	—	—	201
1978	Gerry Rafferty & Joe Egan - Stuck in the Middle with You: The Best of Stealers Wheel (A&M compilation)	—	—	—
1990	The Best of Stealers Wheel (compilation)	—	—	—
2017	Stealers Wheel: The A&M Years (all three studio albums, some live tracks)	—	—	—
"—" denotes releases that did not chart.

=== Singles ===
Year	Title	Peak chart positions				Certifications
Year	Title	UK	AUS	US	CAN	Certifications
1973	"Stuck in the Middle with You"	8	16	6	2	BPI: 2× Platinum
1973	"Everything Will Turn Out Fine" (in AUS/US/CAN as "Everyone's Agreed That Everything Will Turn Out Fine")	33	90	49	25	
1973	"Star"	25	67	29	12	
1975	"Right or Wrong"	―	―	―	―	
1975	"Found My Way to You"	―	―	―	―	
"—" denotes releases that did not chart or were not released in that territory.
