= Elbow Beach (album) =

Studio album by Louise
- Released: 31 July 2000
- Recorded: 1999–2000
- Length: 45:22
- Label: EMI
- Producer: Matt Elliss; Alison Clarkson; Graham Plato

Louise chronology
Woman in Me (1997)	Elbow Beach (2000)	Changing Faces – The Best of Louise (2001)

Singles from Elbow Beach
- 1. "2 Faced" Released: 17 July 2000; 2. "Beautiful Inside" Released: 30 October 2000

Professional ratings
Review scores
Source	Rating
Yahoo! Music	6/10 stars
MTV Asia	7/10

Elbow Beach is the third solo album by English singer Louise. It was released on 31 July 2000 and reached no.12 on the UK Albums Chart.

== Background ==
After the success of her 1997 album Woman in Me, Louise married her longtime boyfriend, footballer Jamie Redknapp. Louise then spent just under a year making what she claimed was her "most personal album to date". Titled Elbow Beach, it was named after the location of her honeymoon. Creatively, Louise was more involved in the process of this album than her previous two, co-writing nine of the twelve tracks.

== Single releases ==
In July 2000, the album's first single "2 Faced" went straight into the UK Singles Chart at no.3, becoming Louise's highest-charting single. The track "Beautiful Inside" was released as the second single from the album and peaked at no.13 in November 2000. A third single, "For Your Eyes Only", had been selected and remixed, but the single was dropped due to the low charting of "Beautiful Inside". The single mix samples Chic's "Le Freak" and appeared on Louise's Myspace profile.

== Commercial performance ==
Despite the hype and critical praise, total sales for Elbow Beach were weaker than Louise's previous two albums and it peaked at no.12 in the UK Albums Chart in August 2000. It was certified Silver by the BPI for sales of over 60,000 copies (in comparison to the Platinum certifications of her first two albums).

== Track listing ==
1. "Beautiful Inside" (Louise Redknapp/Julie Morrison/Cathi Ogden/Wu Tang Clan) – 3:40
2. "First Kiss (The Wedding Song)" (Louise Redknapp/Matt Elliss/Julie Morrison/Cathi Ogden) – 3:27
3. "2 Faced" (Louise Redknapp/Matt Elliss/Julie Morrison) – 3:38
4. "For Your Eyes Only" (Alison Clarkson/Shaun Ward/Mike Ward) – 3:20
5. "Egyptian Queen" (Louise Redknapp/Matt Elliss/Julie Morrison/Cathi Ogden) – 4:48
6. "The Best Thing" (Louise Redknapp/Matt Elliss/Julie Morrison/Cathi Ogden) – 3:37
7. "Bedtime" (Graham Plato/Julie Morrison) – 3:24
8. "That's What Friends Are For" (Matt Elliss/Julie Morrison) – 4:22
9. "Take You There" (Louise Redknapp/Matt Elliss/Julie Morrison/Cathi Ogden) – 4:37
10. "City Boy Fix" (Louise Redknapp/Matt Elliss/Julie Morrison/Cathi Ogden) – 3:00
11. "In Our Room" (Louise Redknapp/Matt Elliss/Julie Morrison/Cathi Ogden) – 4:01
12. "Lost" (Louise Redknapp/Matt Elliss/Julie Morrison/Cathi Ogden) – 3:02
13. "Better Back Off" Japanese bonus track (Graham Plato) – 3:24
14. "Say Yes" Japanese bonus track (Louise Redknapp/Matt Elliss/Julie Morrison/Cathi Ogden/Sylvia Bennett-Smith) – 3:27

== Charts ==
=== Weekly charts ===
Weekly chart performance for Elbow Beach
Chart (2000)	Peak position
Scottish Albums (OCC)	23
UK Albums (OCC)	12

=== Year-end charts ===
2000 year-end chart performance for Elbow Beach
Chart (2000)	Position
UK Albums (OCC)	178
