= I Can See Your Voice (British game show) series 1 =

Television game show series

I Can See Your Voice
- Series 1
- Starring: Jimmy Carr; Alison Hammond; Amanda Holden
- Presented by: Paddy McGuinness
- Winners: Good singers: 7; Bad singers: 2
- No. of episodes: Regular: 8; Special: 1; Overall: 9

Release
- Original network: BBC One
- Original release: Regular series: 10 April – 29 May 2021; Special: 24 December 2021

Series chronology
- Next → Series 2

The first series of the British television mystery music game show I Can See Your Voice premiered on BBC One on 10 April 2021.

At the time of filming during the COVID-19 pandemic, health and safety protocols are also implemented.

== Gameplay ==
=== Format ===
According to the original South Korean rules, the guest artist and contestants must attempt to eliminate bad singers during its game phase. At the final performance, the last remaining mystery singer is revealed as either good or bad by means of a duet between them and one of the guest artists.

If the last remaining mystery singer is good, the contestants win £10,000; this is also applied to the winning bad singer selected by them.

=== Rounds ===
1. First Impressions
  The guest artist and contestants are given some time to observe and examine each mystery singer based on their appearance.
2. Lip Sync
  Each mystery singer performs a lip sync to a song; good singers mime to a recording of their own, while bad singers mime to a backing track by another vocalist.
3. Unlock my Life
  The guest artist and contestant are presented with a video package chronicling the daily lives by one of the mystery singers.
4. Interrogation
  The guest artist and contestants must choose one mystery singer to question with. The host is given a list of 15 questions shown on the screen and the artist can ask any of 15 questions within the 30 second time limit.

== Episodes ==
Legend:
Good singer
Bad singer
— The contestants won the money.
— The winning bad singer stole the money.

Episode		Guest artist (Note: Players' notes: For the returning guest artists (who also include foreigners and former good singers), names are displayed in italics.; For the mixed groups, names who identified as bad singers are displayed in italics.)	Contestants	Mystery singers (In their respective numbers and aliases)					
#	Date	Guest artist	Contestants	Elimination order					Winner
#	Date	Guest artist	Contestants	First Impressions	Lip Sync	Unlock my Life		Interrogation	Winner
1	10 April 2021	Danny Jones (McFly)	Lee and John → £10,000	3. Don Chimombe; (Party King)	5. Emmo; (Pitch Perfect)	4. Maxine Jones; (Queen of Clubs)	1. Melissa Chekera; (Rising Star)	2. James Muldoon; (Teacher)	6. Bethan-Wyn Davies; Songwriter
2	17 April 2021	Nadine Coyle (Girls Aloud)	Jen and Nadine → £10,000	3. Tracey Shield; (Voice of the Ocean)	2. Sheena King; (She's Got Pipes)	4. Blaine Gale; (The Body)	5. Mickey Anderson; (Euro Star)	1. Scott Cameron; (Guitar Star)	6. Katy Eckland; Nailed It!
3	24 April 2021	Ronan Keating (Boyzone) (Note: Season highlight: Foreign guest artist: Ronan Keating (Boyzone) (IRL; ep. 3))	Saaj and Sash → £0	5. Lawrence Rowe; (Commercial King)	1. Dayton Grey; (Smooth Operator)	2. Bailey Lindsay; (The Knockout)	4. Nicola Bulcock; (Martial Artist)	6. Abigail Hetherington; (Vintage Vocals)	3. Devon Chapman; Junior Doctor
4	1 May 2021	Fleur East	Anton and Duban → £10,000	1. Jordan Wilcox; (Acrobat)	5. Kalex Willzy; (Radio Host)	6. Denise Scott; (Pop Princess)	2. Harriette Sleight; (Child Star)	4. Charlotte Hoather; (One-hit Wonder)	3. Zalika Henry; Sweet Harmony
5	8 May 2021	Louise Redknapp (Eternal)	Billy and Leanne Murphy → £10,000	4. David Starowicki; (Personal Trainer)	2. Nicola Ward; (Girl Power)	3. Simone Kaye; (Olympic Performer)	1. Aoife McMorrow; ('A' Star)	5. Emilie Israel; (West End Girl)	6. James Franklyn; Soul Man
6	15 May 2021	Heather Small (M People)	Kristen and Caitlin → £0	1. Basit Eniafe; (Model)	3. Rosie Charles; (Sweet Tooth)	6. Jack Nicholson; (Wrestler)	4. Marcus Sangiovanni; (Wedding Singer)	2. Amba Tremain; (Class Act)	5. Maria Luxe; Fashionista
7	22 May 2021	Alexandra Burke	Daniel and Joe → £10,000	5. Kenny Watt; (Rock Star)	6. Hector Godoy; (Mexican Idol)	2. Joy-Princess Emokpae; (Salsa Queen)	3. Dan Reynolds; (Unplugged)	4. Sue McGrath; (Atomic)	1. Pete Green; Jailhouse Rocker
8	29 May 2021	Ricky Wilson (Kaiser Chiefs)	Sophie Carrigill and Josh Landmann → £10,000	1. Ryan Brown; (Chef)	4. Tori Baker; (Songbird)	2. Naomi Rogers; (Madame Butterfly)	6. Kelly Erez; (Life Coach)	3. Stefan Parkes; (Dancehall King)	5. Charlie Parris; Salesman
Special	24 December 2021	Leona Lewis	Gabby Logan and Dev → £10,000	1. Danielle Williams; (Santa’s Sax)	5. Tom Hier; (Goals, Frankincense & Myrrh)	4. Hannah Holliday; (Tooth Fairy)	6. Sophie Symeonides; (Christmas Wrapping)	3. Augustine Tanner-Ihm; (Vicar)	2. Wain Douglas/Kara Van-Park; Snow Queen

== Reception ==
Legend:
Highest rated episode
Lowest rated episode

No.	Title	Air date	Timeslot (BST)	Rank	Share	Viewership				Ref(s)
No.	Title	Air date	Timeslot (BST)	Rank	Share	Live	VOSDAL	TSB	Total	Ref(s)
1	"Danny Jones"	10 April 2021	Saturday, 7:20 pm	50	17%	2.465	0.524	0.301	3.29	
2	"Nadine Coyle"	17 April 2021	Saturday, 7:35 pm	39	22.3%	2.919	0.527	0.375	3.822	
3	"Ronan Keating"	24 April 2021	Saturday, 7:25 pm	35	23.6%	2.8	0.536	0.242	3.578	
4	"Fleur East"	1 May 2021	Saturday, 7:25 pm	42	21.7%	2.456	0.651	0.329	3.436	
5	"Louise Redknapp"	8 May 2021	Saturday, 7:45 pm	42	20.5%	2.692	0.614	0.232	3.538	
6	"Heather Small"	15 May 2021	Saturday, 7:40 pm	15	27.8%	3.656	0.806	0.338	4.8	
7	"Alexandra Burke"	22 May 2021	Saturday, 7:10 pm	33	26%	2.843	0.465	0.533	3.84	
8	"Ricky Wilson"	29 May 2021	Saturday, 6:25 pm	Not reported						
Special	"Leona Lewis"	24 December 2021	Friday, 9:30 pm	Not reported						

Source: BARB
