= Breast Cancer Care =

British cancer charity

- Breast Cancer Care logo
- Founded: 1973
- Founder: Betty Westgate
- Type: Support Charity
- Purpose: Health
- Location: Chester House, Kennington Business Park, 1-3 Brixton Road, Oval London SW9 6DE, UK
- Region served: United Kingdom
- Services: Helpline, Ask Our Nurses by email, online Forum, face-to-face support, patient information, healthcare professional training
- Key people: Samia al Qadhi (Chief Executive), Dr Emma Pennery (Clinical Director), Betty Westgate (founder)
- Website: www.breastcancercare.org.uk
- Formerly called: Breast Care and Mastectomy Association of Great Britain

Breast Cancer Care is the only specialist UK-wide charity in the UK providing care, support and information to anyone affected by breast cancer. The charity's headquarters are in London, with additional offices in Sheffield, Cardiff, and Glasgow. It is regularly quoted by media looking for the perspective of patients on breast cancer.

== Merger ==
In November 2018 support focussed Breast Cancer Care and research focussed Breast Cancer Now announced that they would merge on 1 April 2019, creating a charity with an income of about £45 million. The merged charity is chaired by Jill Thompson, formerly a trustee of Breast Cancer Care, and the chief executive is Delyth Morgan, formerly chief executive of Breast Cancer Now. The combined headquarters are at Breast Cancer Now offices at Aldgate, London. The charity will operate using both names for about a year, when a new logo and name is expected to be introduced.

It is supported by Asda's Tickled Pink campaign. Lacey Turner, Louise Redknapp and Pandora's Kiss have all supported it.

== Services ==
Breast Cancer Care provides a range of information and support services for anyone affected by breast cancer, including friends and family of the person diagnosed and breast care health professionals. These services include:

- a free telephone support and information Helpline
- Ask Our Nurses email service
- a number of specialist face-to-face services that include expert information, the chance to ask questions and to meet other people also facing breast cancer
- a wide range of free patient information, both on and offline, including voice services on Amazon Alexa
- an online peer support Forum

== Nursing Network ==
Breast Cancer Care's Nursing Network was launched as a service for healthcare professionals in 2010. More than 1,000 nurses have now joined the service.

Members of the Nursing Network work together to help ensure people affected by breast cancer get the best treatment and care available.

Breast Cancer Care's support for healthcare professionals through the Nursing Network includes training sessions on specific aspects of breast cancer treatment and care, and ways to share best practice.

Network members regularly receive information and news about Breast Cancer Care services and campaigns, and clinical developments and changes in practice, particularly via the membership magazine Nursing Network News.

The Breast Cancer Care Helpline is open to healthcare professionals in need of support or guidance.

== See also ==
- Cancer in the United Kingdom
- Breast Cancer Research and Treatment
