= The Truth About Size Zero =

2007 British television documentary

- Directed by: Karen Plumb
- Produced by: Jo Shinner; Karen Plumb
- Starring: Louise Redknapp
- Narrated by: Fiona Allen
- Production company: RDF Media Ltd.
- Distributed by: ITV
- Release date: 7 March 2007
- Running time: 70 min
- Country: UK
- Language: English

The Truth About Size Zero is a TV documentary starring English singer, songwriter, and media personality, Louise Redknapp. Redknapp, concerned about the pressures that women face to be very thin, decided to document what happens when she tries to drop two dress sizes in 30 days. She describes the documentary as her proudest moment away from music. The documentary originally aired on ITV1.

== Content ==
The documentary began with Redknapp taking a trip to Los Angeles, California to meet "Bootcamp Barry" (Barry Jay), founder of Barry's Bootcamp, who is a military-style diet and fitness guru in Hollywood. Based on his advice, Redknapp undertakes a gruelling diet and fitness regime with a goal to lose two dress sizes in 30 days. Over the course of the experiment, she is closely monitored by a dietitian and physician, who highlight the dangers of crash dieting and low body weight, and track Redknapp as her health begins to deteriorate. They advise her to stop her diet and exercise plan, warning her of the health dangers and potential to develop an eating disorder, but she chose to continue because of how strong she felt about the problem of people trying to reach size 0.

During the course of the documentary, Redknapp visited different locations to talk to people. She visited with friend and actress Denise van Outen in Los Angeles, and they discussed van Outen's experiences with people the pressure to lose weight. She went to Rhodes Farm Clinic to meet with several young women who are recovering from anorexia or bulimia to talk about their experiences with eating disorders. She also met with Spice Girl Mel C ("Sporty Spice") to discuss her severe eating disorder during her time the Spice Girls and the media portrayal. She met with her school friend, "Sophie," who had suffered with a severe eating disorder during her teenage years, and they talked about the experience of low caloric intake. She visited her old stage school the Italia Conti Academy of Theatre Arts to talk with students and warn them about the horrors of crash dieting. She presented Clothes Show Live in Birmingham, and while she was there, she interviewed some models, and talked to a model manager about the dangers of the pressure that models are under to be very thin.

As inspiration for her weight loss, Redknapp had bought a size 0 dress to wear at the end of the experiment. She was able to fit into the dress by the end, but she hated the dress and wanted to get out of it because of what she and her friends and family had been through because of her experiment. At the end of the documentary, she threw out the dress, and went out with her friends to eat.

To return to a healthy weight, Redknapp when on a supervised re-eating programme after the documentary was complete.

=== Experiment ===
During the diet, which Redknapp maintained for 30 days, she survived on less than 800 calories per day, eating a low carb diet of oats or omelettes for breakfast, berries (but not after 11:00 AM), fish and green vegetables for lunch and supper, and water, and every day she ran three miles and lifted weights for one hour. She briefly attempted to use a fat burning suit, but was too sick from her dieting to be able to try the suit. She became increasingly ill over the course of making the documentary.

=== Results ===
Over the course of the 30 days, Redknapp lost 11 lb (5 kg), went from a UK size 8 (USA size 4) to a UK size 4 (USA size 0), went down two cup sizes, and her BMI dropped from a healthy 19.4 to an underweight 17.6. She began struggling with day-to-day functions, becoming short tempered and irritable, started having memory problems, started having trouble sleeping, lost her libido, and found her life being controlled by her eating. She appeared gaunt, had developed poor skin colour and dry skin, and had little energy. She said that the experience had been very hard on her family, left her a wreck, and she would never do it again.

Medically, there were other concerns. Her estrogen levels dropped to levels seen in post-menopausal women (she was 32 years old at the time), increasing her risk of osteoporosis and impacting her fertility. She lost 5 lb of muscle, reducing her metabolic rate, putting her at risk of developing increased body fat and yo-yo dieting if not careful. Her doctor felt that her body could recover, but if she were to prolong her diet and exercise regime, she would make herself very unwell.

== Controversy ==
Redknapp's documentary was not without controversy, and was attacked not long after being released. On pro-anorexia and pro-bulimia forums, people praised her for the food information and dieting tips, calling her an inspiration and a hero. There was also criticism that the documentary did not discuss the editing of celebrity photos that presents unrealistic body types, and Redknapp's continuation with her weight loss plan against the advice of her physician as presenting a very damaging message.

== Sequel ==
In 2009, Redknapp created a follow-up documentary called The Truth About Super Skinny Pregnancies that explored the pressures that women face to stay in shape during pregnancies and to lose weight post pregnancy.
