= I Can See Your Voice (British game show) series 2 =

Television game show series

I Can See Your Voice
- Series 2
- Starring: Jimmy Carr; Alison Hammond; Amanda Holden
- Presented by: Paddy McGuinness
- Winners: Good singers: 4; Bad singers: 4
- No. of episodes: 8

Release
- Original network: BBC One
- Original release: 15 October – 24 December 2022

Series chronology
- ← Previous; Series 1

The second series of the British television mystery music game show I Can See Your Voice premiered on BBC One on 15 October 2022.

== Gameplay ==
=== Format ===
According to the original South Korean rules, the guest artist and contestants must attempt to eliminate bad singers during its game phase. At the final performance, the last remaining mystery singer is revealed as either good or bad by means of a duet between them and one of the guest artists.

If the last remaining mystery singer is good, the contestants win £10,000; this is also applied to the winning bad singer selected by them.

=== Rounds ===
1. Lip Sync
  Each mystery singer performs a lip sync to a song; good singers mime to a recording of their own, while bad singers mime to a backing track by another vocalist.
2. Unlock my Life
  The guest artist and contestant are presented with a video package chronicling the daily lives by one of the mystery singers.
3. Home Truths
  The guest artist and contestants "tour" one of the remaining mystery singer's homes for clues (which may include red herrings) for 60 seconds.
4. Interrogation
  The guest artist and contestants must choose one mystery singer to question with. The host is given a list of 15 questions shown on the screen and the artist can ask any of 15 questions within the 30 second time limit.

== Episodes ==
Legend:
Good singer
Bad singer
→ The contestants won the money.
→ The winning bad singer stole the money.

Episode		Guest artist (Note: Players' notes: For the returning guest artists (who also include foreigners and former good singers), names are displayed in italics.; For the mixed groups, names who identified as bad singers are displayed in italics.)	Contestants	Mystery singers (In their respective numbers and aliases)					
#	Date	Guest artist	Contestants	Elimination order					Winner
#	Date	Guest artist	Contestants	Lip Sync	Unlock my Life	Home Truths		Interrogation	Winner
1	15 October 2022	Tony Hadley (Spandau Ballet)	Glenda and Paul → £10,000	2. Bella Kenworthy; (No Scrubs)	4. Ashley Almonte Martinez; (Latin Sensation)	6. Frankie Clark; (Smash HIIT)	3. Moyo Ajibade; (Man of the Match)	5. Ryan Morgan; (Poet)	1. Charlie Marshall; Go the Distance
2	22 October 2022	Alexandra Burke	Charlie and Dexter → £10,000	2. Joe Sant; (Star Student)	5. Dominic Liburd; (Removal Man)	6. Debora Lo Re; (House Music)	4. Michael Long; (Moneybags)	3. Emaé; (Basement Vaxx)	1. Brooke Barber; Talk the Talk
3	29 October 2022	Becky Hill	Heather and Kaveh → £0	6. Rebekah; (Kitchen Disco)	3. Kezia Gill; (Happy Go Plucky)	1. Lewis Snell; (Tour Guide)	5. David McGuigan; (Candyman)	4. Laura Mac; (Theatre Manager)	2. Winnie Atayero; Psychologist
4	5 November 2022	Lulu	Haloo and Zanist → £10,000	3. Carmela Finnigan; (French Connection)	5. Libby Garratt; (Dough-Re-Mi)	2. Trisha McCluney; (Cher and Cher A-Like)	4. Bill Sharpe; (Alpacapella)	6. Kelly Jade Williams; (Cover Girl)	1. Charlie White; Muddy Holly
5	26 November 2022	Claire Richards (Steps)	Esslyne and Nkechi → £0	3. Debra Butler; (Retro)	2. David Taylor; (Ringmaster)	6. Charlotte Fox; (Strike a Pose)	4. Anthony Raspin; (Milkman)	5. Samuel Jepson; (Wing Man)	1. Christian Azolan; Work of Art
6	3 December 2022	Andy Bell (Erasure)	Dominique and Tahiela → £10,000	2. Cosby Prawl; (Top Seller)	6. Amy Whittle; (Karma Chameleon)	1. Amy Newell; (Actress)	4. Elena Pitsiaeli; (Waiting in the Wings)	3. Solen Salih; (Show Business)	5. Liam Burns; Cut Above
7	10 December 2022	Simon Webbe (Blue)	Tracy and Michelle → £0	4. Rachel Newnham; (Ace)	1. Jeanie Hasler; (999)	5. Jack Joseph; (Trending)	3. Ethan Davis; (Social Carer)	6. Laura Ferry; (Heaven Scent)	2. Duncan Paylor; Hiker
8	24 December 2022	Layton Williams	Maryanne and Chloe → £0	5. Max Bullinga; (Cabbie)	3. Siobhan Elouise; (High Flyer)	4. Phillipa Gill; (Step Back in Time)	6. Deon Nzou; (Chemistry Grad)	2. Fionn Gardner; (Bartender)	1. Sarah Coleman; 9 to 5

== Reception ==
Legend:
Highest rated episode
Lowest rated episode

No.	Title	Air date	Timeslot (BST)	Rank	Share	Viewership				Ref(s)
No.	Title	Air date	Timeslot (BST)	Rank	Share	Live	VOSDAL	TSB	Total	Ref(s)
1	"Tony Hadley"	15 October 2022	Saturday, 9:05 pm	Not reported						
2	"Alexandra Burke"	22 October 2022	Saturday, 9:10 pm	47	18.8%	2.051	0.414	0.55	3.015	
3	"Becky Hill"	29 October 2022	Saturday, 9:10 pm	20	24.6%	3.122	0.847	0.601	4.57	
4	"Lulu"	5 November 2022	Saturday, 9:10 pm	25	26.4%	2.826	0.511	0.45	3.788	
5	"Claire Richards"	26 November 2022	Saturday, 8:25 pm	35	19.8%	2.873	0.523	0.256	3.652	
6	"Andy Bell"	3 December 2022	Saturday, 9:15 pm	47	19.1%	2.084	0.328	0.298	2.71	
7	"Simon Webbe"	10 December 2022	Saturday, 9:15 pm	Not reported						
8	"Layton Williams"	24 December 2022	Saturday, 8:35 pm	Not reported						

Source: BARB
