= Confession (Louise song) =

Single by Louise

from the album Confessions
- Released: 13 February 2025
- Genre: Pop; electro-pop
- Length: 3:22
- Label: Lil Lou
- Songwriters: Jon Shave; Anya Jones; Louise Redknapp; Wayne Hector
- Producer: Jon Shave

Louise singles chronology
"High Hopes" (2023)	"Confession" (2025)	"Borderline" (2025)

"Confession" is a song by English recording artist Louise, released by Lil Lou Records Ltd on 13 February. "Confession" was released as the lead single for Louise's fifth studio album, Confessions, which was released on 23 May 2025.

== Background and release ==
Louise began teasing new music over the summer of 2024, performing some of a new song "Get into It" at a performance at Mighty Hoopla on 2 June 2024. "Confession" was announced as the lead single on Instagram on 10 February 2025 and released three days later. Louise herself described the song as "a real departure from everything I've done in the past" and as "cheek, fun and upbeat electro-pop".

== Critical reception ==
Confession has been described as a "glittering, ambient toe-tapper, and an unapologetic statement of desire", and has been positively compared to the output of Kylie Minogue and Jessie Ware.

== Charts ==
Chart performance for "Confession"
Chart (2025)	Peak position
UK Singles Downloads (OCC)	83
UK Singles Sales (OCC)	81
