= Naked (Louise album) =

Studio album by Louise
- Released: 24 June 1996
- Recorded: 1995–1996
- Genre: Pop; R&B
- Length: 55:04
- Label: EMI

Louise chronology
Naked (1996)	Woman in Me (1997)

Singles from Naked
- 1. "Light of My Life" Released: 25 September 1995; 2. "In Walked Love" Released: 4 March 1996; 3. "Naked" Released: 28 May 1996; 4. "Undivided Love" Released: 19 August 1996; 5. "One Kiss from Heaven" Released: 18 November 1996

Professional ratings
Review scores
Source	Rating
AllMusic	2/5 stars
The Guardian	1/5 stars
Melody Maker	(favorable)
Music Week	3/5 stars

Naked is the debut solo album by English singer Louise. Released in July 1996, it peaked at number seven on the UK Albums Chart and sold over 300,000 copies in the UK alone, being certified platinum.

== Background ==
After leaving Eternal, Louise signed a solo record deal with First Avenue Management. She was still under contract to EMI Records at that time, and in October 1995 she released her debut solo single, "Light of My Life", which peaked at No. 8.

Six months later, Louise's second single "In Walked Love" (previously a hit for American dance-pop group Exposé), peaked at No. 17. However, her third single, "Naked", was a bigger hit, peaking at No. 5 in the UK. The album Naked was released shortly afterwards. Two further singles, "Undivided Love" and "One Kiss from Heaven", also became top-10 hits later in 1996.

== Track listing ==
All tracks written by Simon Climie/Oliver Smallman, unless otherwise noted.

1. "Naked" (Trevor Steel/John Holliday/Oliver Smallman) – 3:32
2. "In Walked Love" (Diane Warren) – 3:54
3. "Light of My Life" – 4:15
4. "The Best That You Bring" (Dave James/Sheppard Solomon) – 3:48
5. "One Kiss from Heaven" – 4:04
6. "Thinking About You Baby" (Dennis Charles/Ronnie Wilson) – 3:36
7. "Discussions" (Charles/Louise Nurding/Wilson) – 4:01
8. "Undivided Love" – 3:46
9. "Back to Love" (Nurding/Johnny Douglas/Joseph Boussard/Ralph Williams/Carrol Washington) – 4:38
10. "Never Too Late" (Climie/Dozier) – 4:04
11. "Goodbye to Love" (Charles/Wilson) – 3:22
12. "That's the Way I Like It" (Charles/Nurding/Wilson) – 3:38
13. "I'll Fly Away" (Douglas/Nurding/Ricky Walters) – 4:30
14. "I Gave You My Love" (Charles/Nurding/Wilson) – 3:36

Japanese bonus tracks

15. "All of You" – 3:46
16. "Real Love" – 4:21

== Charts ==
=== Weekly charts ===
Weekly chart performance for Naked
Chart (1996)	Peak position
Scottish Albums (OCC)	16
UK Albums (OCC)	7

=== Year-end charts ===
Year-end chart performance for Naked
Chart (1996)	Position
UK Albums (OCC)	50

== Certifications ==
Certifications for Naked
Region	Certification	Certified units/sales
United Kingdom (BPI)	Platinum	300,000^{^}
^{^} Shipments figures based on certification alone.
