= Tony Williams (English musician) =

Bass guitarist (born 1947)

- Born: Anthony Williams; 19 August 1947 (age 78); Durham, England
- Genres: Progressive rock, folk rock
- Instruments: Bass guitar, electric guitar
- Years active: 1960s–present
- Formerly of: Stealers Wheel, Jethro Tull

Anthony Williams (born 19 August 1947) is an English musician who played bass guitar in the folk rock/rock band Stealers Wheel and who also played with Jethro Tull.

== Career ==
Born in Durham City, he later moved to Blackpool, Lancashire where other future band members of Jethro Tull also lived including, Ian Anderson, Barriemore Barlow, John Evan and Jeffrey Hammond.

In the 1960s he played guitar with The Executives, a Blackpool based Mod band who recorded a handful of singles with frontman Roy Carr and future Jethro Tull bassist Glenn Cornick.

Williams originally auditioned to join Jethro Tull in 1968 along with Martin Barre. He also brought out a single, "Lazy River". From 1970 to 1971 he played bass guitar with the band Requiem.

In 1972 Williams joined Stealers Wheel, which had been formed earlier that year in Paisley, Renfrewshire by former school friends Gerry Rafferty and Joe Egan. Williams helped record their self-styled debut album Stealers Wheel, which was produced by the influential American songwriters and producers Leiber & Stoller. Williams left Stealers Wheel a year later. In 1978 he joined Jethro Tull, replacing John Glascock who was unwell, at the request of Ian Anderson. He joined them on their tour of North America before returning to studio work and television production. This led to him being engaged by USA telecommunications giant Southwestern Bell as assistant marketing Director for their launch of Cable TV in the UK. ="jt-williamsgallery">"Tony Williams Photo Gallery – Jethro Tull". Collecting Tull.</ref>

After being contacted by iTunes and K-tel records in California, and following negotiations which started in 2006, Williams re-formed Stealers Wheel in Blackpool in 2008 with two other former band members, Rod Coombes and Paul Pilnick together with locally based musician and songwriter Tony Mitchell. On 10 November 2008 they started filming a music video for a re-release of "Stuck in the Middle" on the Fylde coast. They also began writing songs for a new album to be released in 2009, although they have no plans to go on tour.

== Personal life ==
Williams works in elephant conservation, and has worked as a Public Relations advisor, based at Blackpool Zoo, for the British and Irish Association of Zoos and Aquariums. In 2007 he was elected as a local councillor in Blackpool. He was re-elected in 2011 and was the Leader of the Conservative Group on Blackpool Borough Council and a board member of the Arts Council North West. He resigned as Conservative Group in February 2023 and is not now directly involved in local politics and contributes to various media sites on political issues and investigations. >"Blackpool Council's". 22 February 2023.</ref>
