= Everything Will Turn Out Fine =

"Everything Will Turn Out"

Single by Stealers Wheel
- A-side: "Everything Will Turn Out Fine"
- B-side: "Johnny's Song"
- Released: August 10, 1973
- Label: A&M AMS 7079
- Composer(s): Joe Egan, Gerry Rafferty
- Producer(s): A Leiber-Stoller Production

UK singles chronology
"Stuck in the Middle" (1973)	"Everything Will Turn Out" (1973)	"Star" (1973)

"Everything Will Turn Out Fine" aka "Everyone's Agreed That Everything Will Turn Out Fine" was a 1973 hit (7" single) for the Scottish group Stealers Wheel. The song has been covered by Ebony and Ian Cussick.

== Stealers Wheel version ==
=== Background ===
There were two differing UK pressings. One release had the A side title of "Everything'l Turn Out Fine". The other was "Everything Will Turn Out Fine". Both pressings were issued on A&M AMS 7079. In the US the single was released as "- Everyone's Agreed That Everything Will Turn Out Fine" on A&M 1450. On the week of 7 July 1973 a full-page ad for the song appeared in Billboard.

=== Reception ===
The single was reviewed in the 23 June issue of Billboard. The reviewer said that the song had all of the ingredients of the distinctive Stealers Wheel style, and it had a smoother flowing style than the group's smash hit "Stuck in the Middle".

=== Charts ===
==== US charts ====
The single entered the Cash Box chart at no. 87 on the week of 7 July 1973. During its nine-week run, it peaked at no. 33 on 25 August and held that position for an additional week.

For the week of 7 July, the single debuted on the Billboard Easy Listening Top 50 at No. 49. It was also at No. 114 on the Bubbling Under the Hot 100 chart.

For the week of 9 September 1978, "Everything Will Turn Out Fine" credited to Gerry Rafferty and Joe Eagan debuted in the Record World 101 - 150 Singles Chart.

==== UK charts ====
In the UK, the single spent six weeks in the charts, peaking at no. 33.

==== European charts ====
The single spent four weeks in the charts in the Netherlands, peaking at no. 10. It spent four weeks in the charts in Belgium and peaked at no. 24.

== Ebony version ==
In 1980, the group Ebony covered the song and released it as a single by EMI Records. The song became a hit which got the group back on television at the close of the disco era. They performed the song on Musikladen 52 on 10 April 1980.

== Ian Cussick version ==
=== Background ===
Ian Cussick's version was released on RCA Victor in Germany in 1985. It appears on the Dariusz Michalczewski presents Tiger Hits compilation.

=== Airplay ===
According to the 25 March 1985 issue of Euro Tip Sheet, Ian Cussick's version of the song was getting airplay on Radio M1 in Germany. The following week's issue recorded that his single was getting airplay on Radio SDR in Stuttgart, Radio HR in Frankfurt where it was the "Record of the Week", and Radio RADIO M1. The following week (1 April), the song was getting airplay on Radio SWF.
