= Beautiful Inside =

2000 single by Louise Redknapp

Single by Louise

from the album Elbow Beach
- B-side: "Clear Water"; "Better Back Off"
- Released: 30 October 2000
- Length: 3:16
- Label: EMI; 1st Avenue
- Songwriters: Louise; Julie Morrison; Cathi Ogden; Jason Hunter; Robert Diggs; Dennis Coles; Russell Jones; Corey Woods; Gary Grice; Lamont Hawkins; Clifford Smith
- Producer: Matt Elliss

Louise singles chronology
"2 Faced" (2000)	"Beautiful Inside" (2000)	"Stuck in the Middle with You" (2001)

Beautiful Inside is a song by English singer Louise, released on 30 October 2000. The single was taken from her third solo album, Elbow Beach (2000), and contains a sample from the Wu-Tang Clan. The song charted at number 13 on the UK Singles Chart.

== Track listings ==
UK CD1

1. "Beautiful Inside" (radio edit)
2. "Clear Water"
3. "Better Back Off"
4. "Beautiful Inside" (video)

UK CD2

1. "Beautiful Inside" (radio edit)
2. "Beautiful Inside" (D-Bops Saturday Night Mix)
3. "Beautiful Inside" (Sleaze Sisters Anthem Mix)

UK cassette single

1. "Beautiful Inside" (radio edit)
2. "Clear Water"
3. "Better Back Off"

== Charts ==
Chart (2000)	Peak position
Europe (Eurochart Hot 100)	53
Scotland Singles (OCC)	17
UK Singles (OCC)	13
