= Woman in Me =

Studio album by Louise
- Released: 6 October 1997
- Genre: Pop
- Length: 68:18
- Label: EMI

Louise chronology
Naked (1996)	Woman in Me (1997)	Elbow Beach (2000)

Singles from Woman in Me
- 1. "Arms Around the World" Released: 22 September 1997; 2. "Let's Go Round Again" Released: 17 November 1997; 3. "All That Matters" Released: 23 March 1998

Professional ratings
Review scores
Source	Rating
AllMusic	3/5 stars
Music Week	3/5 stars

Woman in Me is the second studio album by English singer Louise, released by EMI in October 1997. The album was preceded by the release of the single "Arms Around the World", which peaked at number 4 on the UK Singles Chart, becoming Louise's highest charting single at the time. This was quickly followed up by the single "Let's Go Round Again" (a cover of the 1980 hit by the Average White Band), which reached number 10. A third single, "All That Matters", peaked at number 11.

By this time, Louise's popularity was at an all-time high; Woman in Me had been certified platinum for UK sales of over 300,000 copies, she was on the cover of various magazines including Smash Hits and GQ, and had been voted 'The Sexiest Woman in the World' by the readers of FHM magazine. The 'Louise Soft and Gentle No Sweat Tour' was also a success and was one of the first tours to be choreographed by Jamie King.

== Track listing ==
1. "Arms Around the World" (George/Noel/Louise Nurding/Trevor Steel/John Holiday) – 4:11
2. "All That Matters" (Jeff Franzel/Nina Ossoff/T.Silverlight) – 3:40
3. "I Pray" (Joe Kipnis) – 4:55
4. "Let's Go Round Again" (Alan Gorrie) – 4:01
5. "Woman in Me" (Trevor Steel/John Holiday/B.Thiele) – 3:49
6. "Trust in You" (Graham Plato/Louise Nurding/N.Lowis) – 5:12
7. "Reminds Me of You" (P.Shane/Kenedy/Pescotto) – 3:58
8. "Shut Up & Kiss Me" (Noel/George/Trevor Steel/John Holiday) – 3:40
9. "Healing Love" (Simon Climie/Noel/George) – 5:13
10. "When Will My Heart Beat Again" (Graham Plato/Louise Nurding/N.Lowis) – 4:26
11. "New York Moon" (Barry Blue/Robyn Smith) – 4:25
12. "Happy Love" (Charlie Mole/Gerry D'eveaux) – 4:15
13. "Who Do You Love" (Peter Kearney/Steve Robson) – 4:09
14. "Don't Be Shy" (Graham Plato/Louise Nurding/N.Lowis) – 4:52
15. "Running Back for More" (Louise Nurding/Graham Plato/N.Lowis) – 3:46
16. "Love Will Bring You Back to Me" (Jodie Wilson/Berny Cosgrove/Kevin Clark) – 4:16
17. "Distraction" Japanese bonus track
18. "How You Make Me Feel" Japanese bonus track

== Tour ==
Tour dates for the Soft & Gentle 'No Sweat' Tour
Soft & Gentle 'No Sweat' Tour
Date	City	Country	Venue
United Kingdom & Ireland
20 November 1997	Sheffield	England	Sheffield City Hall
21 November 1997	Nottingham	England	Royal Centre
23 November 1997	Portsmouth	England	Portsmouth Guildhall
24 November 1997	Cardiff	Wales	St David's Hall
25 November 1997	Bristol	England	Colston Hall
27 November 1997	Liverpool	England	Empire Theatre
28 November 1997	Southport	England	Southport Theatre
30 November 1997	Aberdeen	Scotland	Capitol Theatre
1 December 1997	Glasgow	Scotland	Royal Concert Hall
2 December 1997	Newcastle	England	Newcastle City Hall
4 December 1997	Blackburn	England	King George’s Hall
5 December 1997	York	England	York Barbican
7 December 1997	Manchester	England	Manchester Apollo
9 December 1997	Bradford	England	St George’s Hall
11 December 1997	Cambridge	England	Cambridge Corn Exchange
14 December 1997	Bournemouth	England	Bournemouth International Centre
15 December 1997	London	England	Wembley Arena
16 December 1997	Brighton	England	Brighton Centre
18 December 1997	Wolverhampton	England	Wolverhampton Civic Hall
20 December 1997	Dublin	Ireland	Olympia Theatre
21 December 1997	Belfast	Northern Ireland	Ulster Hall

== Charts ==
=== Weekly charts ===
Weekly chart performance for Woman in Me
Chart (1997)	Peak position
Dutch Albums (Album Top 100)	76
French Albums (SNEP)	65
Scottish Albums (OCC)	11
UK Albums (OCC)	5

=== Year-end charts ===
Year-end chart performance for Woman in Me
Chart (1997)	Position
UK Albums (OCC)	55

== Certifications ==
Certifications for Woman in Me
Region	Certification	Certified units/sales
United Kingdom (BPI)	Platinum	300,000^{^}
^{^} Shipments figures based on certification alone.
