= Elbow Beach, Bermuda =

Beach in Bermuda

Coordinates: 32°16′21″N 64°46′39″W

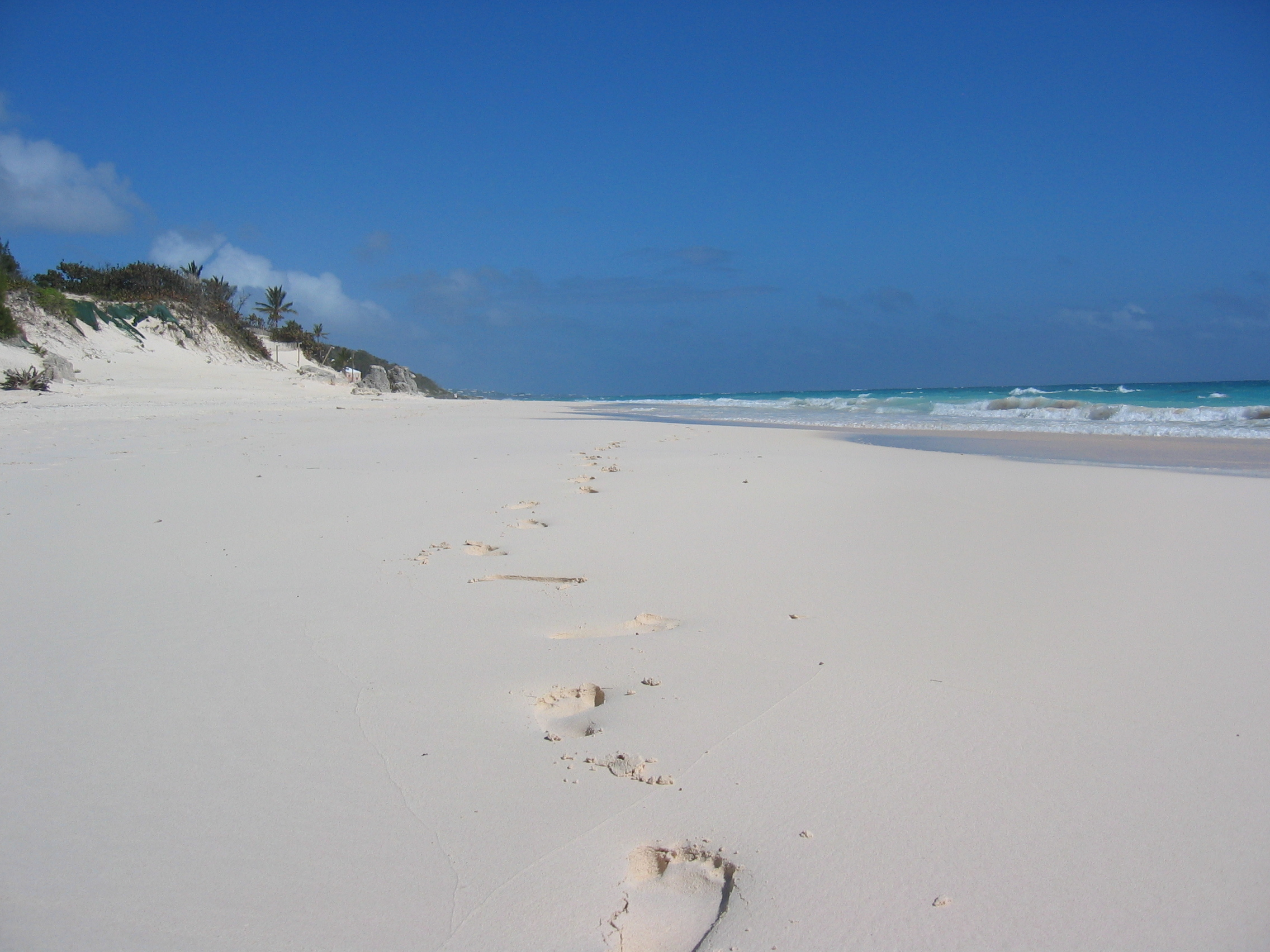
A view of Elbow Beach looking east

Elbow Beach is one of the most popular beaches on the main island of Bermuda. Located at 60 South Shore Road, Paget Parish, PG 04 on the southern (Atlantic Ocean) coast of Paget Parish, it is also home to one of Bermuda's most famous resorts, the Elbow Beach Hotel. Part of the beach is privately owned by the hotel for use by its guests; there is public access to the rest of the beach.

Elbow Beach is renowned for its breathtaking landscape, featuring expansive stretches of pink sand that are a trademark of Bermuda’s beaches. The beach’s waters are often calmer than nearby Horseshoe Bay. The pink sand is created by tiny crushed coral particles mixed with white sand, giving the beach its unique color.

Elbow Beach appeared on an episode of The Sopranos.

Address: 60 South Shore Road, Paget Parish, PG 04, Bermuda
