= Undivided Love =

1996 single by Louise Redknapp

Single by Louise

from the album Naked
- B-side: "How in the World"; "Better Next Time"
- Released: 19 August 1996
- Length: 3:48
- Label: EMI; 1st Avenue
- Songwriters: Simon Climie; Noel; George
- Producer: Simon Climie

Louise singles chronology
"Naked" (1996)	"Undivided Love" (1996)	"One Kiss from Heaven" (1996)

Music video
- "Undivided Love" on YouTube

"Undivided Love" is a song by British singer Louise, released as the fourth single from her debut album, Naked (1996). The song is co-written and produced by Simon Climie, who also provides backing vocals, and was released on 19 August 1996 by EMI and 1st Avenue Records. It peaked at number five in the United Kingdom and number 13 in Ireland. Elsewhere, it became a top-30 hit in Iceland and Israel. The accompanying music video was directed by Randee St. Nicholas. Jon O'Brien of AllMusic described the song as "'80s-sounding", adding that it repeated the trick of "Naked".

== Track listings ==
- UK CD1
1. "Undivided Love"
2. "Undivided Love" (T-Empo vocal)
3. "Undivided Love" (T-Empo dub)
4. "Undivided Love" (Tin Tin Out mix)
5. "Undivided Love" (Studio 54 mix)
- UK CD2
1. "Undivided Love" (single mix)
2. "How in the World"
3. "Better Next Time"
- UK cassette single
1. "Undivided Love" – 3:47
2. "Undivided Love" (T-Empo vocal) – 7:38
3. "Undivided Love" (Tin Tin Out mix) – 8:20
4. "Undivided Love" (Studio 54 mix) – 6:12
- European CD single
1. "Undivided Love"
2. "How in the World"

== Personnel ==
Personnel are adapted from the Naked album booklet.

- Simon Climie – writing, backing vocals, production
- Denis Ingoldsby – writing (as Noel)
- Oliver Smallman – writing (as George)
- Louise – backing vocals
- Dee Lewis – backing vocals
- Chyna Gordon – backing vocals
- Grant Mitchel – keyboards, programming
- Andy Bradfield – engineering, mixing

== Charts ==
Chart (1996)	Peak position
Europe (Eurochart Hot 100)	52
Iceland (Íslenski Listinn Topp 40)	30
Israel (Israeli Singles Chart)	22
Scottish Singles Sales (Official Charts)	7
UK Singles (Official Charts)	5
UK Airplay (Music Week)	11
