= Louise Redknapp =

English singer (born 1974)

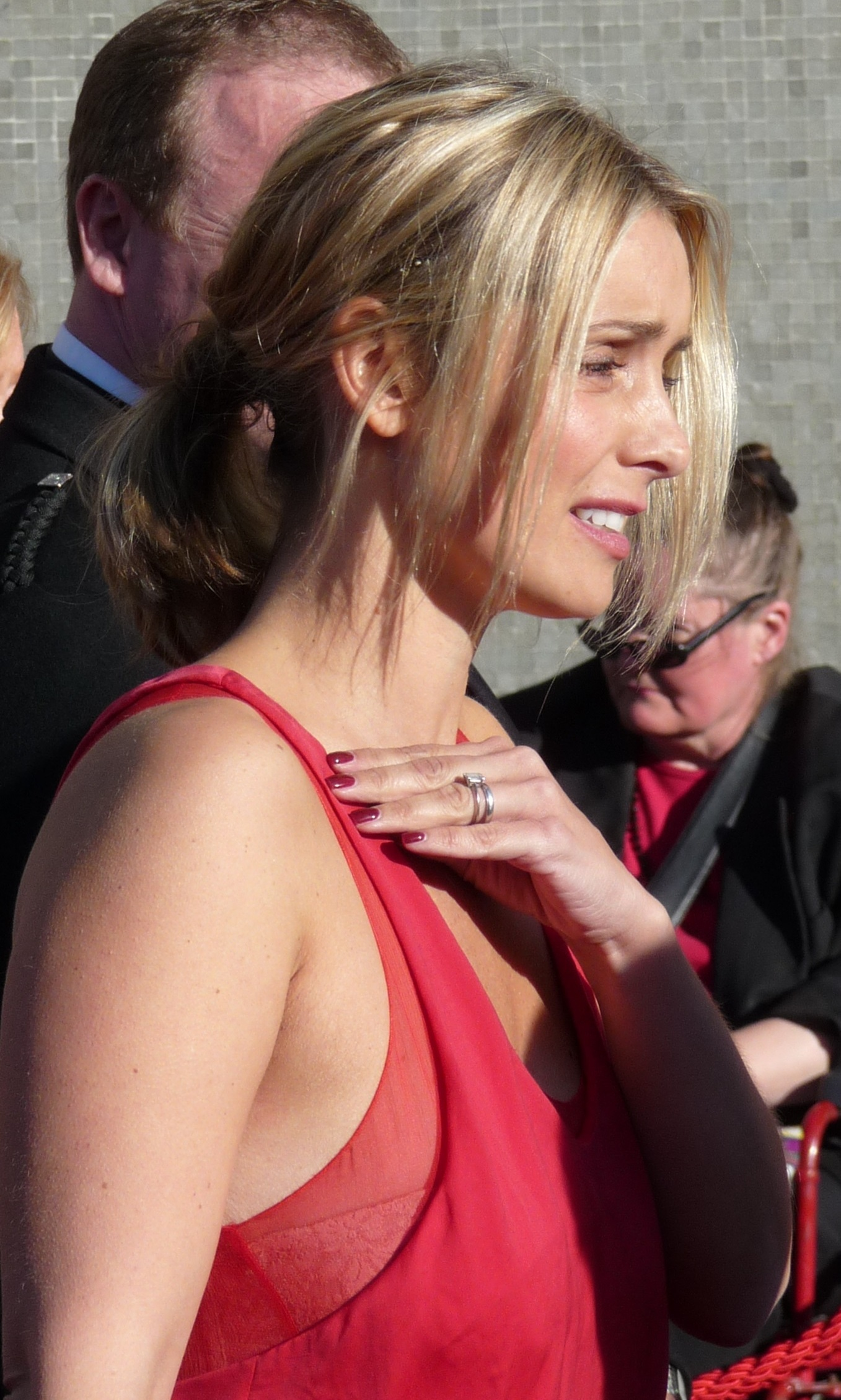
- Redknapp at the BAFTA Awards 2009
- Born: Louise Elizabeth Nurding; 4 November 1974 (age 52); Lewisham, London, England
- Other name: Louise
- Education: Italia Conti Academy of Theatre Arts
- Occupations: Singer; media personality; dancer; actress; television presenter
- Spouse: Jamie Redknapp (m. 1998; div. 2017)
- Children: 2
- Musical career
- Genres: R&B; pop; hip hop; dance-pop; blue-eyed soul
- Instrument: Vocals
- Years active: 1992–present
- Labels: EMI; 1st Avenue; Positive Records; Warner
- Formerly of: Eternal
- Website: Official website

Louise Elizabeth Redknapp (née Nurding; born 4 November 1974), known mononymously as Louise, is an English singer, dancer and media personality. She was a member of Eternal, an R&B girl group which debuted in 1993 with their quadruple-platinum studio album Always & Forever.

In 1995, she departed from the group for a solo career. Aside from music, Redknapp has presented several television shows and was a judge on the UK version of So You Think You Can Dance. She was married to the English former footballer Jamie Redknapp. In 2016, Redknapp reached the final in the fourteenth series of BBC One's Strictly Come Dancing. Her memoir, entitled You've Got This: And Other Things I Wish I Had Known, was released in 2021.

Redknapp has released five studio albums: Naked (1996), Woman in Me (1997), Elbow Beach (2000) and, following a 17-year hiatus from recording, Heavy Love (2020). Redknapp's Greatest Hits was released on 2 June 2023 and contains reimagined versions of her past singles plus five new songs. Her fifth studio album, Confessions, was released in May 2025; a preceding single, "Confession", was released in February 2025. To date Louise has sold over 15 million records worldwide.

== Early life and education ==
Redknapp was born Louise Elizabeth Nurding in Lewisham, London. Her father was a builder and her mother worked at Gatwick Airport. Redknapp and her two younger brothers grew up in Eltham, London, and Oxted, Surrey. She describes herself as having come from a single-parent family with her mother.

At the age of 11, Redknapp won a scholarship to the Italia Conti Academy of Theatre Arts in London, where she met her future Eternal colleague Kéllé Bryan on her first day.

== Career ==
=== 1989–1995: Career beginnings and Eternal ===
While out clubbing at the age of 15, Redknapp met the music manager Oliver Smallman of First Avenue Management, who was forming an all-girl group. She subsequently introduced Denis to Kéllé Bryan. Kéllé and Redknapp, together with sisters Easther and Vernie Bennett, formed the band Eternal in 1992. The group performed R&B, and recorded a number of hits during the 1990s. Eternal's debut single "Stay" entered the UK charts at number sixteen and climbed to number four. Redknapp left the group in 1995 to pursue a solo career, amid unsubstantiated rumours that she was forced to leave because a radio station in the United States dedicated to black music would not promote the racially mixed group. Redknapp said that she left because she was miserable and homesick.

=== 1995–1997: Naked and Woman in Me ===
In late 1995, Redknapp signed a record deal with First Avenue management and EMI Records. Now professionally known simply as "Louise", her debut solo single was the orchestral ballad "Light of My Life" (which reached number eight on the UK charts). Her second solo release, "In Walked Love" (previously a hit from the self-titled 1992 album by the dance/pop group Exposé), fared less well and missed the UK top ten. However, Redknapp's third single, "Naked", turned things around and became her biggest hit to date, peaking at number five in the UK. Redknapp's debut solo album, also entitled Naked, was subsequently released in 1996 on the back of the single's success. The album received lukewarm reviews, but nevertheless peaked at number seven on the UK Albums Chart. It was later certified Platinum by the BPI for over 400,000 copies sold in the UK alone and over a million copies worldwide. Two further singles were released: "Undivided Love" (UK No. 5) and "One Kiss from Heaven" (UK No. 9).

In 1997, Redknapp returned with the single "Arms Around the World", which reached number four in the UK. Her second solo album, Woman in Me, peaked at number five in the UK and went on to gain platinum status in the UK and sold over a million units worldwide. The album also made an impact across Europe, charting in a number of countries. To support and celebrate the success of the album, Redknapp embarked on a UK-wide 'sell-out' arena tour of over twenty dates, including Wembley Arena. "Let's Go Round Again" (a cover of a song by the Average White Band) was the second single released from the album, which reached number ten. She was voted "Sexiest Woman in the World" by the readers of SKY Magazine in 1997.

=== 2002–2016: Lil' Lou and music hiatus ===
In 2002, Redknapp signed with Positive Records (a division of Universal Music) to record her fourth solo album. The album, titled Lil' Lou was due for release in 2004 alongside the double A-side "Pandora's Kiss"/"Don't Give Up", which peaked at number five and raised money for Tickled Pink/Breast Cancer Care. Redknapp submitted "about 10 or 12 tracks" for the album to the label. However, due to the singer becoming pregnant with her son Charley, the album was never released.

Later, on 15 September 2023, Louise released the Lil' Lou extended play, which featured five previously unreleased songs originally recorded for the unreleased album. The EP debuted and peaked at number 73 on the UK Albums Downloads Chart one week later.

In the July 2004 edition of FHM magazine, Redknapp was named the "Sexiest Woman of the Decade".

=== 2018–2024: Heavy Love and Greatest Hits ===
On 1 February 2018, Warner/Chappell UK confirmed Redknapp had signed a deal with them to release new material later in the year.

On 10 November 2022, Redknapp released the single "Super Magic". In an interview with Fault magazine, Redknapp shared, "I wanted to make music I loved rather than just ticking a box for what worked in the industry. I think I’ve forever had to fight to prove myself [...] I’m still fighting to prove myself. I feel that the hardest hurdle is to keep on knocking down those doors to prove myself." "Super Magic" is Redknapp's first release under BMG. It debuted at number 89 on the UK Official Singles Downloads Chart Top 100 on 18 November 2022.

On 12 January 2023, Redknapp announced that her Greatest Hits collection, spanning thirty years in the music industry, would be released in June 2023. The compilation will contain five new songs, including a cover of Janet Jackson's 1997 single "Together Again". In the same month, Louise revealed she had been cast as Teen Angel in the summer 2023 production of Grease. Louise released reimagined versions of her singles "Just A Step From Heaven" and "Naked" as promotional singles from her Greatest Hits compilation. Her single "High Hopes" was released on 27 April 2023. On 1 June 2023, Louise performed in concert at the Shepherd's Bush Empire; Michelle Gayle appeared as a guest and former Eternal bandmate Kéllé Bryan made a surprise appearance on stage to perform 1994 single "Crazy". Louise's compilation album Greatest Hits was released on 2 June 2023.

On 25 September 2023, it was reported that Redknapp and her former bandmate Kéllé Bryan had pulled out of a purported Eternal reunion tour scheduled for 2024 after a row occurred because their former bandmates, sisters Easther and Vernie Bennett, purportedly refused to play at LGBTQ and Pride events over objections that the trans community had "hijacked" Pride.

=== 2025–present: Confessions ===
On 13 February 2025, Louise released the single "Confession", and announced her fifth studio album, Confessions, which was released in May 2025. The album debuted at number 8 on the UK Albums Chart Top 100, becoming her first album since 1997's Woman in Me to reach the top 10. On 31 December 2025, she performed with Irish singer Ronan Keating on the latter's BBC One New Year's Eve programme, Ronan Keating and Friends: A New Year's Eve Party.

== Television career ==
On television, Redknapp has presented editions of SMTV Live, CD:UK, Soccer Aid: Extra Time, This Morning, three series of the revived The Clothes Show for UKTV Style, and in March 2007 the controversial documentary The Truth About Size Zero for ITV.

Louise Redknapp has been seen as the face of a number of advertising campaigns: the "Safe and White" campaign for Boots, Flora's "Omega 3" products, Boots and BT. She became brand ambassador for Orbit gum in 2007

In 2009, Louise Redknapp filmed a follow-up documentary The Truth About Super Skinny Pregnancies displaying the pressures on women to stay in shape during and after their pregnancies. Later that year in September 2009, Redknapp presented The Farmer Wants a Wife for Five, a relaunch of a series that originally appeared on ITV in 2001. In 2009, Redknapp was also announced as the face of online fashion retailer Fashion Union. The following year in January 2010, Redknapp took over as the full-time presenter of the BBC Sunday morning programme Something for the Weekend for two years.

Redknapp was a judge on the UK version of So You Think You Can Dance, broadcast on BBC One. In 2011, Redknapp made her acting debut alongside Ray Winstone as Diana Smith in the feature film The Hot Potato. Redknapp had a cosmetic range named Wild About Beauty, which she launched with make-up artist Kim Jacob; which she sold in 2017.

On 15 August 2016, Redknapp was announced as a contestant for the fourteenth series of Strictly Come Dancing. She reached the 2016 finals with professional dancer Kevin Clifton. In April 2018, Redknapp made her radio debut, guest-presenting two evening shows on Heart, on Sunday 8 April and Sunday 15 April.

In May 2021, Redknapp appeared on The Masked Dancer masked as Flamingo. She was the second celebrity to be unmasked. That same month, Redknapp appeared on the first series of BBC game show I Can See Your Voice, performing "Let's Go Round Again".

== Other endeavours ==
In 2003, Redknapp published a magazine called Icon, aimed solely at professional sports stars and celebrities with then-husband Jamie Redknapp and former footballer Tim Sherwood. They later sold the magazine to another publisher.

== Personal life ==
Nurding was introduced to football player Jamie Redknapp by singer Robbie Williams in 1995. They married in Bermuda on 29 June 1998, and have two sons. Prior to giving birth to her first son in 2004, Redknapp suffered from endometriosis, and underwent laser surgery treatment for the condition. Following her appearance on Strictly Come Dancing in 2016, the couple confirmed in September 2017, that they had decided to separate. A family court in central London granted a decree nisi for divorce after 19 years of marriage on 29 December 2017.

Redknapp was disqualified from driving for six months in 2024, after police witnessed her using her mobile phone, while she was driving her Mini, on her commute to work.

== Philanthropy ==
In 2003, Redknapp's double A-side single "Pandora's Kiss/Don't Give Up", was released to raise money for Breast Cancer Care's "Tickled Pink" campaign. She also participated in a celebrity edition of The Apprentice in 2008, to raise money for charity. Redknapp organised a charity sale of celebrity designer clothes at the London department store Selfridges for the charity Mothers4Children in November 2009.

== Discography ==
=== Studio albums ===
Title	Album details	Peak chart positions				Certifications
Title	Album details	UK	FRA	NLD	SCO	Certifications
Naked	Released: 24 June 1996; Label: EMI; Format: CD, cassette, digital download, streaming	7	—	—	16	BPI: Platinum
Woman in Me	Released: 6 October 1997; Label: EMI; Format: CD, cassette, digital download, streaming	5	65	76	11	BPI: Platinum
Elbow Beach	Released: 31 July 2000; Label: EMI; Format: CD, cassette, digital download, streaming	12	—	—	23	BPI: Silver
Heavy Love	Released: 17 January 2020; Label: Warner, Lil Lou; Format: CD, LP, cassette, digital download, streaming	11	—	—	6	
Confessions	Released: 23 May 2025; Label: Lil Lou; Format: CD, LP, cassette, digital download, streaming	8	—	—	7	

=== Compilation albums ===
List of compilation albums, with selected details, chart positions and certifications
Title	Year	Chart positions	Certifications
Title	Year	UK	Certifications
Changing Faces – The Best of Louise	Released: 10 September 2001; Label: Parlophone; Format: CD, digital download	9	BPI: Silver
Finest Moments	Released: 23 December 2002; Label: Parlophone; Format: CD, digital download	—	
Greatest Hits	Released: 2 June 2023; Label: BMG; Format: CD, streaming, digital download	11	

=== Extended plays ===
List of compilation albums, with selected details, chart positions and certifications
Title	Year	Chart positions
Title	Year	UK Digital
Lil' Lou	Released: 15 September 2023; Label: Tag8; BMG; Format: Digital download, streaming	73

=== Singles ===
List of singles, showing year, selected chart positions and album
Title	Year	Chart positions						Album
Title	Year	UK	AUS	FRA	IRL	NLD	SCO	Album
"Light of My Life"	1995	8	—	—	18	—	11	Naked
"In Walked Love"	1996	17	—	—	—	—	22	Naked
"Naked"	1996	5	70	—	—	—	7	Naked
"Undivided Love"	1996	5	—	—	—	—	7	Naked
"One Kiss from Heaven"	1996	9	—	—	—	—	13	Naked
"Arms Around the World"	1997	4	—	—	—	95	9	Woman in Me
"Let's Go Round Again"	1997	10	—	30	—	70	8	Woman in Me
"All That Matters"	1998	11	—	—	—	—	13	Woman in Me
"2 Faced"	2000	3	—	—	13	—	4	Elbow Beach
"Beautiful Inside"	2000	13	—	—	—	—	17	Elbow Beach
"Stuck in the Middle with You"	2001	4	—	—	44	—	3	Changing Faces – The Best of Louise
"Pandora's Kiss / Don't Give Up"	2003	5	—	—	—	—	5	Non-album single
"Stretch"	2019	—	—	—	—	—	—	Heavy Love
"Lead Me On"	2019	—	—	—	—	—	—	Heavy Love
"Breaking Back Together"	2019	—	—	—	—	—	—	Heavy Love
"Not the Same"	2019	—	—	—	—	—	—	Heavy Love
"Hurt"	2019	—	—	—	—	—	—	Heavy Love
"Super Magic"	2022	— (Note: "Super Magic" did not enter the Official UK Top 100 Chart, but peaked at number 89 on the UK Official Singles Downloads Chart Top 100 and 96 in the UK Official Singles Sales Chart on 18 November 2022.)	—	—	—	—	—	Greatest Hits
"High Hopes"	2023	—	—	—	—	—	—	Greatest Hits
"Confession"	2025	— (Note: "Confession" did not enter the UK Singles Chart, but debuted at number 75 on the UK Singles Downloads Chart, and at number 81 on the UK Singles Sales Chart, both on 21 February 2025.)	—	—	—	—	—	Confessions
"Borderline"	2025	—	—	—	—	—	—	Confessions
"Only Dancer"	2025	—	—	—	—	—	—	Confessions

=== Promotional singles ===
List of promotional singles
Song	Year	Album
"Better Back Off"	2000	Elbow Beach
"Small Talk"	2019	Heavy Love
"Hammer"	2019	Heavy Love
"Just a Step from Heaven (Reimagined)"	2023	Greatest Hits
"Naked (Reimagined)"	2023	Greatest Hits
"Love Me More"	2025	Confessions

== Tours ==
- Soft & Gentle No Sweat Tour (1997)
- Changing Faces Tour (2001)
- Louise Intimate and Live (2017/2018)
- Heavy Love Tour (2020)
- Naked/Confessions Tour (2027)

== Awards and nominations ==
Awards and nominations received by Louise Redknapp
Award	Year	Category	Nominee(s)	Result	Ref.
Brit Awards	1997	British Female Solo Artist	Herself	Nominated	
Brit Awards	1998	British Female Solo Artist	Herself	Nominated	
NME Awards	1998	Best Solo Artist	Herself	Nominated	
NME Awards	1998	Most Desirable Person	Herself	Won	
NME Awards	1999	The Pop Personality You Would Most Like To Be Marooned On A Desert Island With	Herself	Won	
Smash Hits Poll Winners Party	1996	Best Female Singer	Herself	Won	
Smash Hits Poll Winners Party	1996	Best Album	Naked	Nominated	
Smash Hits Poll Winners Party	1996	Best Album Cover	Naked	Nominated	
Smash Hits Poll Winners Party	2000	Most Fanciable Female	Herself	Nominated	
Smash Hits Poll Winners Party	2000	Best Dressed Female	Herself	Nominated	
