= One Kiss from Heaven =

1996 single by Louise Redknapp

Single by Louise

from the album Naked
- Released: 18 November 1996
- Genre: Pop; swingbeat
- Length: 4:04
- Label: EMI; 1st Avenue
- Songwriters: Simon Climie; Noel; George
- Producer: Simon Climie

Louise singles chronology
"Undivided Love" (1996)	"One Kiss from Heaven" (1996)	"Arms Around the World" (1997)

Music video
- "One Kiss from Heaven" on YouTube

"One Kiss from Heaven" is the fifth and final single released from English singer Louise's debut album, Naked (1996). The song was written by Simon Climie, Denis Ingoldsby (Noel), and Oliver Smallman (George), and it was produced by Climie. Released on 18 November 1996 by EMI and 1st Avenue Records, it reached number nine on the UK Singles Chart the same month.

== Critical reception ==
Jon O'Brien from AllMusic noted "the sultry chill-out pop" of "One Kiss from Heaven". Kristy Barker from Melody Maker praised the song as "perfectly formed" and "perfectly executed swingbeat". A reviewer from Music Week gave it three out of five, stating that her "impressive solo track record will no doubt continue with this fifth single from Naked. It is her most sophisticated offering yet, but lacks the simple charm of its predecessors." In his album review, Mark Sutherland from NME described it as a "soppy smoocher".

== Track listings ==
- UK CD1
1. "One Kiss from Heaven" (remix)
2. "One Kiss from Louise" (pop megamix)
3. "One Kiss from Heaven" (Boot 'n' Mac club mix)
4. "One Kiss from Heaven" (Boot 'n' Mac dub mix)
- UK CD2
1. "One Kiss from Heaven" (remix)
2. "Naked" (Tony De Vit mix)
3. "One Kiss from Louise" (club megamix)
- UK cassette single
1. "One Kiss from Heaven" (remix)
2. "One Kiss from Louise" (pop megamix)

== Personnel ==
Personnel are adapted from the Naked album booklet.

- Simon Climie – writing, backing vocals, guitars, programming, production
- Denis Ingoldsby – writing (as Noel)
- Oliver Smallman – writing (as George)
- Louise – backing vocals
- Tracy Ackerman – backing vocals
- Dee Lewis – backing vocals
- Grant Mitchel – keyboards, programming
- Andy Bradfield – engineering, mixing
- Lorraine Francis – engineering and mixing assistance

== Charts ==
=== Weekly charts ===
Chart (1996)	Peak position
Europe (Eurochart Hot 100)	64
Scottish Singles Sales (Official Charts)	13
UK Singles (Official Charts)	9
UK Airplay (Music Week)	15
UK Pop Tip Club Chart (Music Week) with "Naked"	1

=== Year-end charts ===
Chart (1996)	Position
UK Pop Tip Club Chart (Music Week) with "Naked"	10
