= Naked (Louise song) =

1996 single by Louise

- Artwork for standard European and Australian releases, including UK CD2 release

Single by Louise

from the album Naked
- B-side: "Keep the Lovin' In"; "Do Me Right"; "Light of My Life"
- Released: 27 May 1996
- Genre: Dance-pop; R&B
- Length: 3:34
- Label: EMI; 1st Avenue
- Songwriters: Trevor Steel; John Holliday; Noel
- Producers: Bump & Grind

Louise singles chronology
"In Walked Love" (1996)	"Naked" (1996)	"Undivided Love" (1996)

Music video
- "Naked" on YouTube

"Naked" is a song by English singer Louise, released on 27 May 1996 by EMI and 1st Avenue Records as the third single from her debut solo album of the same name (1996). The song was written by Trevor Steel, John Holliday and Denis Ingoldsby (Noel), and it was produced by Bump & Grind. The song charted at number five in the United Kingdom and was certified platinum there. It also became a top-20 hit in Iceland, Ireland and Israel, and a top-70 hit in Australia. The accompanying music video was directed by Greg Masuak.

== Critical reception ==
Jon O'Brien from AllMusic noted that "modeling itself on Janet Jackson's 'Rhythm Nation' era, the breathless vocals, funky R&B rhythms, and risqué video of 'Naked' catapulted Louise into the Top Five for the first time." Can't Stop the Pop described it as a "slick pop anthem; the delivery snaps and gets right to the point". They added that "it’s a performance quite unlike any that Louise had delivered before, but one which suits her immensely. The pacing is perfect, with each line rolling fluidly off her tongue. The chorus remains similarly tight, while also allowing Louise some room to purr her way through it sensually".

Pan-European magazine Music & Media named it "a charming pop/dance record with a simply irresistible hook, which makes it easy to programme for a multitude of formats." A reviewer from Music Week gave it a score of three out of five, noting that "more poppy than previous releases, this should see the former Eternal member in the Top 20 once more." In his review of the album, Mark Sutherland from NME stated that "nothing else quite touches the majesty of 'Naked'". In 2014, the Official UK Chart named "Naked" a "pop gem" and a "tribute to feeling a bit frisky".

== Track listings ==
- UK CD1
1. "Naked" (radio mix)
2. "Naked" (Garden of Eden vocal)
3. "Naked" (Imagination vocal)
4. "Naked" (Kamasutra vocal mix)
5. "Naked" (Imagination dub)
6. "Naked" (Boot 'n' Mac club mix)
- UK CD2
1. "Naked" (radio mix)
2. "Keep the Lovin' In"
3. "Do Me Right"
4. "Light of My Life"
- UK 12-inch single

A1. "Naked" (Garden of Eden vocal)
A2. "Naked" (Imagination vocal)
B1. "Naked" (Kamasutra vocal mix)
B2. "Naked" (Imagination dub)

- Australian CD single
1. "Naked" (radio mix)
2. "Keep the Lovin' In"
3. "Naked" (Kamasutra vocal mix)
4. "Naked" (Imagination vocal mix)

== Personnel ==
Personnel are adapted from the Naked album booklet.

- Trevor Steel – writing
- John Holliday – writing, guitars
- Denis Ingoldsby – writing (as Noel)
- Jackie Rawe – backing vocals
- Zeeteah Massiah – backing vocals
- Bump & Grind – production, programming
- Maxx – mixing
- Niven Garland – engineering

== Charts ==
=== Weekly charts ===
Chart (1996–1997)	Peak position
Australia (ARIA)	70
Europe (Eurochart Hot 100)	35
Iceland (Íslenski Listinn Topp 40)	13
Israel (Israeli Singles Chart)	20
Netherlands (Dutch Top 40 Tipparade)	4
Netherlands (Single Top 100 Tipparade)	2
Scottish Singles Sales (Official Charts)	7
UK Singles (Official Charts)	5
UK Airplay (Music Week)	15
UK Pop Tip Club Chart (Music Week) with "One Kiss from Heaven"	1

=== Year-end charts ===
Chart (1996)	Position
UK Singles (OCC)	78
UK Pop Tip Club Chart (Music Week) with "One Kiss from Heaven"	10

== Certifications ==
Region	Certification	Certified units/sales
United Kingdom (BPI)	Platinum	600,000^{^}
^{^} Shipments figures based on certification alone.
