= All That Matters (Louise song) =

1998 single by Louise

Single by Louise

from the album Woman in Me
- B-side: "Woman in Me" (live); "When Will My Heart Beat Again" (live)
- Released: 23 March 1998
- Length: 3:27
- Label: EMI; 1st Avenue
- Songwriters: Jeffrey Franzel; Nina Ossoff; Terry Silverlight
- Producer: Nigel Lowis

Louise singles chronology
"Let’s Go Round Again" (1997)	"All That Matters" (1998)	"2 Faced" (2000)

"All That Matters" is a song by British singer Louise, released in March 1998 by EMI and 1st Avenue as the third and final single from the singer's second album, Woman in Me (1997). The single peaked at number 11 on the UK Singles Chart. It was remixed for the clubs by Hex Hector and DJ Tonka.

== Critical reception ==
British magazine Music Week wrote, "Since launching her solo career, Louise has notched up seven consecutive Top 20 hits. Her increasing maturity is reflected in this mid-tempo swayer, which has an unobtrusive backing track that allows her to take centre stage-though not without a little help from the cream of UK backing vocalists like Miriam Stockley and Lance Ellington. It's a very pleasant if unexciting track and one that will easily maintain her excellent track record."

== Track listings ==
- UK CD1
1. "All That Matters" (radio mix) – 3:27
2. "Woman in Me" (Mark Goodier Radio One session) – 3:43
3. "When Will My Heart Beat Again" (Mark Goodier Radio One session) – 4:01
4. "Louise Answerphone Message" – 0:14
- UK CD2
1. "All That Matters" (radio mix) – 3:27
2. "All That Matters" (DJ Tonka mix) – 7:08
3. "All That Matters" (Cas Roc vocal mix) – 6:22
4. "All That Matters" (Hex Hector vocal mix) – 6:38
5. "All That Matters" (Hyper Go Go vocal mix) – 6:21
6. "All That Matters" (The Almighty mix) – 6:17
- UK 12-inch single

A1. "All That Matters" (Cas Roc vocal mix) – 6:28
A2. "All That Matters" (Cas Roc dub mix) – 7:47
B1. "All That Matters" (DJ Tonka mix) – 7:08
B2. "All That Matters" (Hex Hector dub Revisited mix) – 6:48

- UK cassette single
1. "All That Matters" (radio mix) – 3:27
2. "All That Matters" (Cas Roc dub mix) – 7:47
3. "When Will My Heart Beat Again" (Mark Goodier Radio One session) – 4:01
- European CD single
1. "All That Matters" (radio mix) – 3:27
2. "Woman in Me" (Mark Goodier Radio One session) – 3:43

== Personnel ==
Personnel are adapted from the Woman in Me album booklet.

- Jeffrey Franzel – writing
- Nina Ossoff – writing
- Terry Silverlight – writing
- Lance Ellington – backing vocals
- Miriam Stockley – backing vocals
- Natalie Jordan – backing vocals
- Cathi Ogden – backing vocals
- The London Session Orchestra – strings
- Nick Ingman – orchestra arrangement, conducting
- Nigel Lowis – production
- Ren Swan – mixing
- John Beal – engineering
- Dave Graham – engineering assistance

== Charts ==
Chart (1998)	Peak position
Europe (Eurochart Hot 100)	45
Scotland Singles (OCC)	13
UK Singles (OCC)	11
