= In Walked Love =

1994 single by Exposé

Single by Exposé

from the album Exposé
- Released: January 1994
- Genre: Pop
- Length: 4:52 (album version)
- Label: Arista
- Songwriter: Diane Warren
- Producers: Steve Thompson; Michael Barbiero

Exposé singles chronology
"As Long as I Can Dream" (1993)	"In Walked Love" (1994)	"I Specialize in Love" (1995)

"In Walked Love" is a song by the American girl group Exposé. Written by Diane Warren and produced by Steve Thompson and Michael Barbiero, the song can be found on the group's 1992 album Exposé, their third studio album. Lead vocals on the pop ballad were performed by Ann Curless. The song features Al Pitrelli as guest guitarist. In 1996, British singer Louise covered the song and reached number 17 on the UK Singles Chart with her rendition.

== Reception ==
Released as the fourth and final single from the album Exposé, "In Walked Love" entered the Billboard Hot 100 chart in April 1994, peaking at number 84. It fared better on the Billboard adult contemporary chart, where it reached number 17. To date, this is the last Exposé single to reach either chart, although their single "I'll Say Good-Bye for the Two of Us" (from the soundtrack to the film Free Willy 2) "bubbled under" the Hot 100 in 1995.

== Track listing ==
- Cassette single (Arista)
1. "In Walked Love"
2. "The Same Love"
- Promo CD (Arista)
1. "In Walked Love" – 4:19

== Charts ==
Chart (1994)	Peak position
Canada Top Singles (RPM)	49
Canada Adult Contemporary (RPM)	22
US Billboard Hot 100	84
US Adult Contemporary (Billboard)	17

== Louise version ==
"In Walked Love"

Single by Louise

from the album Naked
- B-side: "All of You"; "Real Love" (remix)
- Released: March 4, 1996
- Genre: R&B
- Length: 3:55
- Label: EMI; 1st Avenue
- Songwriter: Diane Warren
- Producer: Simon Climie

Louise singles chronology
"Light of My Life" (1995)	"In Walked Love" (1996)	"Naked" (1996)

Music video
- "In Walked Love" on YouTube

British singer Louise covered "In Walked Love" and released it on March 4, 1996, by EMI and 1st Avenue Records as the second single from her first album, Naked (1996). Her version was produced by Simon Climie and reached number 17 on the UK Singles Chart.

=== Critical reception ===
A reviewer from Music Week gave Louise's version of "In Walked Love" a score of three out of five, adding, "Continuing to build profile, the former Eternal singer's voice sounds even stronger on this chartbound R&B love ballad." Mark Sutherland from NME described it as "straightforwardly danceable". Gina Morris from Smash Hits gave it two out of five, writing, "Little Lu's second solo single is a bit poppier than her debut but, like a lame pony, it doesn't go anywhere."

=== Track listings ===
- UK CD1; Australasian and Japanese CD single
1. "In Walked Love"
2. "In Walked Love" (Uno Clio vocal mix)
3. "In Walked Love" (Dancing Divas vocal mix)
4. "In Walked Love" (Dancing Divas dub mix)
- UK CD2 and cassette single
1. "In Walked Love"
2. "All of You"
3. "Real Love" (Tin Tin Out remix)
4. "In Walked Love" (Uno Clio dub mix)

=== Personnel ===
Personnel are adapted from the Naked album booklet.

- Diane Warren – writing
- Louise – backing vocals
- Dee Lewis – backing vocals
- Tracy Ackerman – backing vocals
- Chyna Gordon – backing vocals
- Simon Climie – backing vocals, production
- Danny G – piano
- Toby Baker – piano
- Paul Waller – drums, programming
- Bump & Grind – additional production
- Maxx – mixing
- Paul Walton – mixing assistance
- Andy Bradfield – engineering
- Niven Garland – engineering

=== Charts ===
Chart (1996)	Peak position
Estonia (Eesti Top 20)	15
Europe (Eurochart Hot 100)	87
Scottish Singles Sales (Official Charts)	22
UK Singles (Official Charts)	17
UK Airplay (Music Week)	13
UK Club Chart (Music Week)	16

=== Release history ===
Region	Date	Format(s)	Label(s)	Ref.
United Kingdom	March 4, 1996	CD; cassette	EMI; 1st Avenue	
Japan	June 26, 1996	CD	EMI Japan	
