= 2 Faced =

2000 single by Louise Redknapp

Single by Louise

from the album Elbow Beach
- B-side: "Say Yes"; "Lost"
- Released: 17 July 2000
- Length: 3:41
- Label: EMI; 1st Avenue
- Songwriter(s): Louise; Matt Elliss; Julie Morrison
- Producer(s): Matt Elliss

Louise singles chronology
"All That Matters" (1998)	"2 Faced" (2000)	"Beautiful Inside" (2000)

"2 Faced" is a song by English singer Louise, released on 17 July 2000 as the lead single from her third studio album, Elbow Beach (2000). It is her highest-charting single, reaching number three on the UK Singles Chart and number 13 on the Irish Singles Chart in July 2000. It has sold 153,000 copies in the UK according to the Official Charts Company.

== Track listings ==
UK CD1

1. "2 Faced"
2. "Say Yes"
3. "Lost"
4. "2 Faced" (video)

UK CD2

1. "2 Faced"
2. "2 Faced" (Agnelli & Nelson vocal mix)
3. "2 Faced" (Perfect Phase vocal)

UK cassette single

1. "2 Faced"
2. "Say Yes"
3. "Lost"

European CD single

1. "2 Faced"
2. "2 Faced" (Perfect Phase vocal)

== Personnel ==
Personnel are taken from the UK CD1 liner notes.

- Louise – writing
- Matt Elliss – writing, keyboard, programming, production, mixing, engineering
- Julie Morrison – writing, backing vocals
- Cathi Ogden – backing vocals
- M4 Design – sleeve design
- Tim Bret Day – photography

== Charts ==
=== Weekly charts ===
Chart (2000)	Peak position
Europe (Eurochart Hot 100)	16
Ireland (IRMA)	13
Scotland (OCC)	4
UK Singles (OCC)	3

=== Year-end charts ===
Chart (2000)	Position
UK Singles (OCC)	98

== Sales ==
Region	Certification	Certified units/sales
United Kingdom	—	153,000
