= Let's Go Round Again =

1980 single by Average White Band

Single by Average White Band

from the album Shine
- Released: 1980
- Genre: Soul, disco
- Length: 4:40 (Album version); 3:53 (7" version)
- Label: RCA
- Songwriter: Alan Gorrie
- Producers: Average White Band, David Foster

"Let's Go Round Again" is a song by the Scottish funk and R&B group Average White Band. The single peaked at No. 12 in the UK, No. 53 on the US Billboard Hot 100, No. 40 on the US Billboard R&B chart and No. 24 on the US Billboard Disco chart.

The corrected title "Let's Go 'Round Again" can be seen printed on their 1994 compilation album, Pickin' Up the Pieces: The Best of Average White Band 1974-1980.

== 1994 version ==
In 1994, the Average White Band decided to remix it after signing with The Hit Label. This version made No. 56 on the UK Singles Chart.

== Louise version ==
"Let's Go Round Again"

Single by Louise

from the album Woman in Me
- B-side: "Just When I Thought"; "How You Make Me Feel"
- Released: 17 November 1997
- Length: 3:50
- Label: EMI; 1st Avenue
- Songwriter: Alan Gorrie
- Producer: Johnny Douglas

Louise singles chronology
"Arms Around the World" (1997)	"Let's Go Round Again" (1997)	"All That Matters" (1998)

Music video
- "Let's Go Round Again" on YouTube

English singer Louise covered "Let's Go Round Again" for her second album, Woman in Me (1997), and released it as the album's second single in November 1997. It charted at No. 10 in the UK, number 21 in Flanders and number 30 in France. On the Eurochart Hot 100, the single reached number 30 in December 1997.

=== Critical reception ===
Jon O'Brien from AllMusic viewed the song as "a faithful cover". Pan-European magazine Music & Media commented, "As her former Eternal colleagues move further into R&B, Louise has been just as effectively repositioned as a mainstream pop/dance act. Here, the process continues with a skilful rebuild of the 1980 Average White Band hit which becomes a slick and effective disco stomper with strong '70s overtones." A reviewer from Music Week gave her version three out of five, declaring it as "a catchy cover", "which is likely to gain momentum from her mammoth tour later this autumn. But it sadly lacks adventure." Gerald Martinez from New Sunday Times described it as "retro-disco".

=== Track listings ===
- UK CD1
1. "Let's Go Round Again"
2. "Just When I Thought"
3. "How You Make Me Feel"
- UK CD2 (mislabelled as CD1 on sleeve)
1. "Let's Go Round Again" (radio mix)
2. "Let's Go Round Again" (Colour Systems Inc. Amber vocals mix)
3. "Let's Go Round Again" (Paul Gotel's Peaceful Warrior mix)
4. "Let's Go Round Again" (187 Lockdown vocal mix)
5. "Let's Go Round Again" (Rated PG club mix)
- UK cassette single
1. "Let's Go Round Again"
2. "Let's Go Round Again" (Rated PG club mix)
3. "Just When I Thought"
- European CD single
1. "Let's Go Round Again" (radio mix)
2. "Let's Go Round Again" (UK album version)
- Australian CD single
1. "Let's Go Round Again" (radio mix)
2. "Let's Go Round Again" (Colour Systems Inc. Amber vocals mix)
3. "Let's Go Round Again" (Paul Gotel's Peaceful Warrior mix)
4. "Let's Go Round Again" (187 Lockdown vocal mix)

=== Personnel ===
Personnel are adapted from the Woman in Me album booklet.

- Alan Gorrie – writing
- Johnny Douglas – production
- Dave Clews – programming
- Nick Ingman – string arrangement, conducting
- Paul Blake – engineering

=== Charts ===
==== Weekly charts ====
Chart (1997–1998)	Peak position
Belgium (Ultratop 50 Flanders)	21
Europe (Eurochart Hot 100)	30
France (SNEP)	30
Netherlands (Dutch Top 40 Tipparade)	5
Netherlands (Single Top 100)	70
Scottish Singles Sales (Official Charts)	8
UK Singles (Official Charts)	10

==== Year-end charts ====
Chart (1997)	Position
UK Singles (OCC)	94
UK Club Chart (Music Week)	96

== Other version(s) ==
In 1990, UK pop group Yell! released their version of "Let's Go Round Again". It charted at No. 78 on the UK Singles Chart.
