= Arms Around the World =

1997 single by Louise

Single by Louise

from the album Woman in Me
- B-side: "Don't Be Shy"; "Intimate"
- Released: 22 September 1997
- Genre: Dance
- Length: 4:08
- Label: EMI; 1st Avenue
- Songwriter(s): George; Noel; Louise Nurding; Trevor Steel; John Holliday
- Producer(s): Trevor Steel; John Holliday

Louise singles chronology
"One Kiss from Heaven" (1996)	"Arms Around the World" (1997)	"Let's Go Round Again" (1997)

Music video
- "Arms Around the World" on YouTube

"Arms Around the World" is a song by English singer Louise, released on 22 September 1997 as the lead single from her second studio album, Woman in Me (1997). It appeared on several music charts, peaking at number four on the UK Singles Chart in September 1997. As reported by the Official Charts Company in January 2020, "Arms Around the World" has sold 159,000 copies in the UK. The video was directed by Toby Tremlett.

== Critical reception ==
Jon O'Brien from AllMusic viewed "Arms Around the World" as a Janet Jackson-inspired track, adding that it sounds like her 1995 song "Runaway". British magazine Music Week rated it three out of five, writing further that "Louise attempts to do a Kylie with a more complex and mature sound, but her efforts are let down by an unsubstantial song lacking any real sparkle." Gerald Martinez from New Sunday Times described the song as a "anthemic" dance song.

== Track listings ==
- UK CD1 and Japanese CD single
1. "Arms Around the World" (radio mix)
2. "Arms Around the World" (Rated PG club mix)
3. "Arms Around the World" (T-Empo club mix)
4. "Arms Around the World" (Farley & Heller Fire Island vocal mix)
- UK CD2
1. "Arms Around the World" (radio mix)
2. "Don't Be Shy"
3. "Intimate"
- UK cassette single
1. "Arms Around the World" (radio mix)
2. "Don't Be Shy"
3. "Arms Around the World" (T-Empo club mix)

== Credits and personnel ==
Credits are adapted from the Woman in Me album booklet.

Studio

- Mixed at Sarm Hook End (Reading, Berkshire)

Personnel

- Oliver Smallman – writing (as George)
- Denis Ingoldsby – writing (as Noel)
- Louise Nurding – writing
- Trevor Steel – writing, production
- John Holliday – writing, production
- Maxx – mixing
- Richard Lowe – mix engineering
- Niven Garland – engineering

== Charts ==
=== Weekly charts ===
Chart (1997–1998)	Peak position
Belgium (Ultratip Bubbling Under Flanders)	6
Europe (Eurochart Hot 100)	32
Netherlands (Single Top 100)	95
Scotland (OCC)	9
UK Singles (OCC)	4

=== Year-end charts ===
Chart (1997)	Position
UK Singles (OCC)	95

== Sales ==
Region	Certification	Certified units/sales
United Kingdom	—	159,000

== Release history ==
Region	Date	Format(s)	Label(s)	Ref.
United Kingdom	22 September 1997	CD; cassette	EMI; 1st Avenue	
Japan	29 October 1997	CD	EMI Japan	
