= Stuck in the Middle with You =

1973 single by Stealers Wheel

- Image of Netherlands 7-inch vinyl cover

Single by Stealers Wheel

from the album Stealers Wheel
- B-side: "Jose"
- Released: 1973
- Recorded: 1972 Apple (London, England)
- Genre: Folk rock; soft rock; pop rock
- Length: 3:28
- Label: A&M
- Songwriters: Gerry Rafferty; Joe Egan
- Producer: Jerry Leiber and Mike Stoller

Stealers Wheel singles chronology
| "Stuck in the Middle with You" (1973) | "Everyone's Agreed That Everything Will Turn Out Fine" (1973) |

Music video
- "Stuck in the Middle with You" on YouTube

"Stuck in the Middle with You" is a song written by Scottish musicians Gerry Rafferty and Joe Egan and performed by their band Stealers Wheel.

The band performed the song on the BBC's Top of the Pops in May 1973, and the song charted at No. 8 on the UK Singles Chart. It also became an international hit, reaching No. 6 on the US Billboard Hot 100.

== Overview ==
"Stuck in the Middle" was first included on Stealers Wheel's 1972 eponymous debut album. Gerry Rafferty provided the lead vocals, with Joe Egan singing harmony. It was produced by Jerry Leiber and Mike Stoller. Rafferty's lyrics are a dismissive tale of a music industry cocktail party (the clowns and jokers would be all the music executives and hangers-on), written and performed as a parody of Bob Dylan's style; the vocal impression, subject, and styling were so similar, listeners have wrongly attributed the song to Dylan since its release.

The song was released as a single in 1973 and the band was surprised by its chart success. The single sold over one million copies, eventually peaking at No. 6 on the US Billboard Hot 100 chart, No. 8 on the UK Singles Chart, and No. 2 on Canada's RPM 100 Singles chart. Billboard ranked it as the No. 36 song for 1973.

The band appeared playing the song on BBC's Top of the Pops on 18 May 1973.

== Music video ==
The video portrays the band performing in a corner of a large, empty building. Their performance is intercut with shots of Egan, miming to a vocal track by Rafferty (who had by then left the band), at a small banquet table with a number of garishly dressed and made-up supper guests. These include an actual clown, a bespectacled bowler-hatted gent devouring spaghetti and a lavishly dressed woman eating cream cakes and grapes. The clown, who has difficulty eating a plastic chicken, continually squeezes Egan out whenever he tries to take food from the table. The guitar solo is played on a guitar played flat with an empty beer bottle used as a slide. Eventually, the other band members appear, driving off the strange characters so that Egan can sit down at last.

== Personnel ==
Personnel are taken from the Stealers Wheel website.

- Gerry Rafferty – guitar, lead vocals
- Joe Egan – keyboards, guitar, lead vocals
- Paul Pilnick – lead guitar
- Tony Williams – bass
- Rod Coombes – drums

== Charts ==
=== Weekly charts ===
| Chart (1973) | Peak position |
|---|---|
| Australia (Kent Music Report) | 16 |
| Belgium (Ultratop 50 Flanders) | 6 |
| Canada RPM Top Singles | 2 |
| Netherlands (Dutch Top 40) | 8 |
| Netherlands (Single Top 100) | 8 |
| New Zealand (Listener) | 16 |
| South Africa (Springbok Radio) | 5 |
| UK Singles (Official Charts) | 8 |
| US Billboard Hot 100 | 6 |
| US Billboard Adult Contemporary | 13 |
| US Cash Box Top 100 | 3 |

=== Year-end charts ===
| Chart (1973) | Position |
|---|---|
| Canada | 32 |
| Netherlands (Single Top 100) | 94 |
| US Billboard Hot 100 | 36 |
| US Cash Box | 28 |

== Certifications ==
| Region | Certification | Certified units/sales |
|---|---|---|
| Denmark (IFPI Danmark) | Gold | 45,000^{‡} |
| Italy (FIMI) | Gold | 50,000^{‡} |
| New Zealand (RMNZ) | 6× Platinum | 180,000^{‡} |
| Spain (Promusicae) | Gold | 30,000^{‡} |
| United Kingdom (BPI) | 2× Platinum | 1,200,000^{‡} |
^{‡} Sales+streaming figures based on certification alone.

== Cover versions ==
English singer Louise recorded a cover that was released on 27 August 2001. Her version reached No. 4 on the UK Singles Chart in September 2001.

Lazlo Bane released a cover on the album Guilty Pleasures in 2007. Their version was used in the film Let's Be Cops and included on the soundtrack.

A cover version by Grace Potter was used as the theme song for the Netflix series Grace and Frankie, and appears in full on the Grace and Frankie (Original Television Soundtrack).

== In popular culture ==
The song is used in Quentin Tarantino's 1992 debut film Reservoir Dogs, during the scene in which the character Mr. Blonde (played by Michael Madsen) taunts and tortures bound policeman Marvin Nash (Kirk Baltz) while singing and dancing to the song. In an interview with Rolling Stone, Tarantino recalled:

That was one of those things where I thought [the song] would work really well, and [during] auditions, I told the actors that I wanted them to do the torture scene, and I'm gonna use "Stuck in the Middle with You", but they could pick anything they wanted, they didn't have to use that song. And a couple of people picked another one, but almost everyone came in with "Stuck in the Middle with You", and they were saying that they tried to come up with something else, but that's the one. The first time somebody actually did the torture scene to that song, the guy didn't even have a great audition, but it was like watching the movie. I was thinking, "Oh my God, this is gonna be awesome!"

The song appears in a 2020 TV commercial for IBM.

The song is used as the theme song for SiriusXM Radio's The Michael Smerconish Program and snippets from various cover versions of the song are used as the show's inter-segment "bumper" music.
