= Light of My Life =

1995 single by Louise Redknapp

Single by Louise

from the album Naked
- B-side: "Real Love"
- Released: 25 September 1995
- Length: 4:17
- Label: EMI; 1st Avenue
- Songwriters: Simon Climie; George; Noel
- Producer: Simon Climie

Louise singles chronology
"Light of My Life" (1995)	"In Walked Love" (1996)

Music video
- "Light of My Life" on YouTube

"Light of My Life" is a song by British singer Louise, released as her first single as a solo artist from the debut solo album Naked (1996), following her departure from Eternal earlier that year. The song was written by Simon Climie, Oliver Smallman (George), and Denis Ingoldsby (Noel), and it was produced by Climie. Released on 25 September 1995 by EMI and 1st Avenue Records, the ballad reached number eight on the UK Singles Chart and number 18 in Ireland. The accompanying music video was directed by Russell Young. It was a Box Top on British music television channel The Box for seven weeks in October 1995.

== Critical reception ==
Jon O'Brien from AllMusic named 'Light of My Life' "a lighters-in-the-air ballad". James Masterton for Dotmusic praised it as "a beautiful ballad that shows her voice off to perfect effect". Pan-European magazine Music & Media wrote, "For her debut single, Louise, once a member of Eternal, cites Stevie Wonder and Quincy Jones as major influences. This smooth ballad, penned by producer Simon Climie, is certainly a change from the up-tempo energy of Eternal." Music Week deemed it as "a disappointing track that may do well but is unlikely to have Eternal worrying too much." Mark Sutherland from NME named it a "Mariah Carey-esque ballad". Siân Pattenden from Smash Hits gave 'Light of My Life' a score of four out of five, writing, "And helloooooo gentlemen, is it a sultry affair. With a voice that's smoother than Louise's shiny hair, it'll be no problem for her to scale the top of the pop ten."

== Track listings ==
- UK CD1 and Australian CD single
1. "Light of My Life"
2. "Light of My Life" (piano and vocal mix)
3. "Real Love"
- UK CD2
1. "Light of My Life"
2. "Real Love" (Tin Tin Out remix)
3. "Real Love" (Stonebridge remix)
4. Exclusive interview with Louise
- UK cassette single
1. "Light of My Life"
2. "Real Love"
- European CD single
1. "Light of My Life"
2. "Light of My Life" (piano and vocal mix)
3. "Real Love" (Tin Tin Out remix)
4. "Real Love" (Stonebridge remix)

== Personnel ==
Personnel are adapted from the Naked album booklet.

- Simon Climie – writing, production
- Oliver Smallman – writing (as George)
- Denis Ingoldsby – writing (as Noel)
- Louise – backing vocals
- Dee Lewis – backing vocals
- Tracy Ackerman – backing vocals
- Donovan Blackwood – backing vocals
- Luís Jardim – percussion
- Andy Bradfield – engineering, mixing
- Nick Ingman – string arrangement, conducting

== Charts ==
=== Weekly charts ===
Chart (1995)	Peak position
Europe (Eurochart Hot 100)	38
Ireland (IRMA)	18
Israel (Israeli Singles Chart)	20
Scottish Singles Sales (Official Charts)	11
UK Singles (Official Charts)	8
UK Airplay (Music Week)	11

=== Year-end charts ===
Chart (1995)	Position
UK Singles (OCC)	100
