= Joe Egan (musician) =

Scottish singer-songwriter (1946–2024)

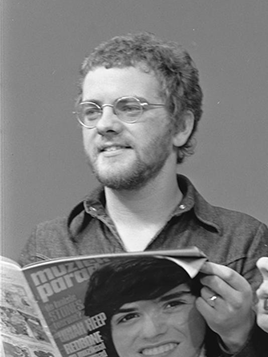
- Egan in 1973

Background information
- Born: Joseph Egan; 18 October 1946; Paisley, Renfrewshire, Scotland
- Died: 6 July 2024 (aged 77) Paisley, Renfrewshire, Scotland
- Genres: Rock
- Occupations: Musician; singer-songwriter
- Instruments: Vocals; keyboards; guitar
- Years active: 1970s–1990s
- Formerly of: Stealers Wheel

Joseph Egan (18 October 1946 – 6 July 2024) was a Scottish singer-songwriter. Along with Gerry Rafferty, Egan was one of the two main members of the folk rock band Stealers Wheel, and co-writer of their hit song "Stuck in the Middle with You".

== Biography ==
Egan was born into an Irish Catholic family in Paisley in Renfrewshire, Scotland. Along with former St Mirin's Academy schoolmate Gerry Rafferty, he played in various smaller British bands, such as The Sensors and The Maverix, and worked as a session musician.

In 1972, Egan and Rafferty founded the folk/rock band Stealers Wheel. After two unsuccessful singles, their debut studio album Stealers Wheel, produced by the American songwriting duo Jerry Leiber and Mike Stoller, became a commercial success. The album's main single, "Stuck in the Middle With You", co-written by Egan with Rafferty, became a hit in 1973 and reached the Top Ten of both the UK Singles Chart and the US Billboard Hot 100. Subsequently, the band had a few smaller successes, such as the Egan-penned song "Star", but stagnating sales figures and artistic differences finally led to the band's break-up in 1975. Both Egan and Rafferty embarked on solo careers, with Rafferty scoring a hit with "Baker Street" in 1978.

Egan's first solo album, Out of Nowhere, released in 1979, produced "Back on the Road", a turntable hit on British radio. In 1981, Egan released his second album, Map, and in 1992 contributed backing vocals to Rafferty's album On a Wing and a Prayer. Egan left the music business in the 1990s.

Egan died from a stroke in Paisley on 6 July 2024, at the age of 77.

== Albums ==
- 1979: Out of Nowhere
- 1981: Map
