= Billy Connolly's Route 66 =

2011 British television travel documentary series

- Title card
- Genre: Documentary
- Presented by: Billy Connolly
- Country of origin: United Kingdom
- Original language: English
- No. of series: 1
- No. of episodes: 4

Production
- Production location: United States
- Production company: Maverick Television

Original release
- Network: ITV
- Release: 15 September – 6 October 2011

Related
- Billy Connolly: Journey to the Edge of the World

Billy Connolly's Route 66 is a British travel documentary television series presented by Scottish comedian and actor Billy Connolly. It focuses on his travels along the famous United States highway, Route 66. The series, which consisted of four episodes, was shown on the British television network ITV. The first episode aired at 9pm on 15 September 2011.

== Production ==
Footage for the series was shot between April and June 2011. Connolly rode a trike the entire length of the 2,488-mile (4,004 km) route, despite being hospitalized for a week after he crashed at the border near Arizona and New Mexico, which resulted in a broken rib and a gash in his knee. Unlike Connolly's previous travelogues this series does not feature Connolly performing stand up comedy on his travels and purely focuses on the sights and the people that Connolly meets along the way.

== Episodes ==
In the first episode, Connolly's journey along Route 66 begins in Chicago, Illinois (the start of Route 66), and reaches St. Louis, Missouri, as an initial destination. The show features the Willis Tower (the tallest building in the United States at the time) as a lead-in to Connolly's meeting with an Illinois champion pie-maker, an Amish family, and two female St. Louis residents whose homes were destroyed by a tornado.

The second episode starts where the first one finished—in St. Louis, with Connolly climbing the Gateway Arch. Now in the American West, Connolly visits a wolf sanctuary, participates in a Civil War re-enactment, hunts for turkey, sits in the world's largest rocking chair, and visits a memorial commemorating the victims of the 1995 Oklahoma City bombing, in which 168 people lost their lives in the Alfred P. Murrah Federal Building.

In the third episode, Connolly joins a cattle drive in Oklahoma City before moving onward to Texas to visit the ghost town of Glenrio and the Devil's Rope Museum. He later meets two men who helped to create the atomic bomb in Los Alamos, New Mexico before taking part in a rodeo in Arizona.

In the fourth and final episode of Route 66, Connolly visits a massive meteorite crater as well as the Grand Canyon in Arizona. He takes the viewers into a sanctuary for unwanted exotic pets where he feeds a lion cub and talks to a campaigner who was trying to keep the historic Route 66 alive. Connolly's journey concludes at the end of Route 66 in Santa Monica.

=== Ratings ===
Episode No.	Airdate	Total viewers	Weekly channel ranking
1	15 September 2011	5.66m	16
2	22 September 2011	5.01m	19
3	29 September 2011	4.57m	16
4	6 October 2011	4.58m	19

== See also ==
- Billy Connolly: Journey to the Edge of the World
