= Barbed Wire Museum =

The Barbed Wire Museum can refer to:

- Devils Rope Barbed Wire Museum
- Kansas Barbed Wire Museum
