= Billy Connolly's World Tour =

British television travel documentary series

Billy Connolly's World Tour consists of five television travel documentaries featuring comedian Billy Connolly. It was released in five series released between 1994 and 2018.

== World Tour of Scotland ==
World Tour of Scotland
- DVD box-set cover
- Created by: Billy Connolly; Nobby Clark; Steve Brown
- Starring: Billy Connolly
- Country of origin: United Kingdom
- No. of episodes: 6

Production
- Running time: 180 minutes (30 min/episode)

Original release
- Network: BBC One
- Release: 12 July – 16 August 1994

World Tour of Scotland is a six-part television series – the first of Billy Connolly's "world tours" – originally broadcast by the BBC in July and August 1994. It involves his touring around his homeland for 54 nights during early 1994, beginning in Greenock and visiting cities and towns and performing live on stage to audiences. However, this, like all his other tours, involves more than just shows: he visits numerous places of historic and scenic value, as well as some places that resonate with his own upbringing.

The series is dedicated "with much love and thanks to the people of Scotland". It has since been released on VHS and DVD. On the latter format, the six episodes are split across two discs.

The series is often repeated on the UKTV channels Dave and Blighty.

=== Opening and closing titles ===
The opening titles feature an aerial view of the Range Rover (driven by Connolly throughout the series) (Note: Another Range Rover (number plate L863 ORV, as opposed to the one Connolly drove (L154 THP)), was used for pick-ups. The hair and eyebrows of the look-alike (from behind, at least) driver are more bushy than Connolly's, and he is wearing a big ring on his right hand and bracelet on his right wrist; Connolly, however, wears neither.) making its way through various locations and weathers. The camera is mounted atop four metal legs, several feet in length.

The closing titles feature an excerpt of Connolly's performing his cover of Van Morrison's "Irish Heartbeat", live at Edinburgh's Usher Hall, over landscape views of the areas visited in the respective episodes.

=== Episode guide ===
==== Episode 1 ====
The series begins with Connolly aboard a Caledonian MacBrayne ferry sailing down the west coast.

- Isle of Arran. As Connolly drives off the ferry, his best friend, Danny Kyle, is shown to be in the passenger seat
  - Brodick Village Hall (concert venue)
  - Connolly is shown playing the banjo with his Isle of Arran-based friends
- Glasgow
  - Dover Street, the street on which Connolly was born
  - Provand's Lordship
  - The tenement building, on Stewartville Street in Partick, where Connolly lived between the ages of fourteen and twenty
  - Glasgow Cross
  - Necropolis
  - King's Theatre (concert venue)
  - Auchengillan Scout Camp (which Connolly, in Pack 141, visited as a Cub Scout)
- Loch Lomond

==== Episode 2 ====
- Partick and Govan
- Stirling (including the MacRobert Centre concert venue) and Bannockburn
- Kirkcaldy and Forfar (concert venue)
- Scone Palace
- Forth Bridge, Forth Road Bridge, and South Queensferry

==== Episode 3 ====
- Blair Atholl (Connolly stays at Blair Castle)
- Highlands (Loch Garry, near Drumochter, where he skites stones on the ice; also passes Dalwhinnie, Laggan and Findhorn Bridge in Tomatin)
- Inverness (concert venue at Eden Court, fishing on the River Ness and views of Loch Ness)
- Culloden Moor

==== Episode 4 ====
- Ulbster, Caithness
- Wick
- Ackergill Tower, Caithness
  - Ring of Brogar (referred to by Connolly as the Standing Stones of Brogar)
  - Kirkwall
  - Scapa Flow (to which he travels on the fishing boat Triton)
- Lerwick, Shetland (including two performances in the same night at the Garrison Theatre; the latter takes him into the next day)

==== Episode 5 ====
- Arbroath (where he samples a smokie and revisits the location at which he lost his virginity)
- Dundee (including footage from his performance at Caird Hall)
  - Dundee Law (Connolly gives a straight reading of William McGonagall's poem The Tay Bridge Disaster within sight of the Tay Rail Bridge. During the course of filming, a blizzard happens, and about two inches of snow falls)
- Scottish Borders, Kelso (including footage from his performance at Tait Hall)

Connolly almost ventures into English territory at the end of the episode when he cycles past the "Scotland" sign in Roxburgh. "I've come a bit far here, I believe," he says, after screeching his bike to a halt. "And me out without my passport. It is a Scottish tour, after all."

"One thing confuses me, however," he continued, as he prepares to retrace his route. "If this is the border with England, and that is the border with Scotland, what happens in here? Maybe it is owned by the Manx government, or something. I don't know. Perhaps you can build a house here and never pay tax again."

==== Episode 6 ====
- Edinburgh
  - Edinburgh Castle (including the firing of the one o'clock gun)
  - Court of Session
  - St. Giles' Cathedral
  - Mary King's Close (Annie's room)
  - Usher Hall (concert venue, from where Connolly gives a pre-show piece to camera)

=== Music ===
The music featured in the series is available on Connolly's 1995 album Musical Tour of Scotland.

== Billy Connolly's World Tour of Australia ==
Billy Connolly's World Tour of Australia is the second in a line of 'world tours' that follow comedian Billy Connolly on his various travels across the globe.

Filmed over four months in 1995, Connolly takes the viewer on a scenic and informative tour of Australia, a country he first visited in the 1970s, intercut with scenes from his stand-up comedy act at various venues around the country. The tour takes in Sydney, Canberra, Melbourne, Adelaide, Perth, Darwin, Alice Springs and Fraser Island. On the way, Connolly also experiences and demonstrates several Australian customs, traditions, and attractions, including swimming with the dolphins in Perth, eating a pie floater in Adelaide, and visiting several museums and galleries, most of which feature some form of Aboriginal art.

The DVD box-set of the series, released in 2004, contains two discs, each featuring four episodes of the tour. The opening titles feature an Aboriginal man playing a didgeridoo in the foreground, while in the background Connolly drives his Boom trike (on which he travels throughout the series, with a New South Wales registration label attached to its rear, which to some may look like a learner's plate) towards and past the camera. The first disc focuses mainly on the southeastern coast of Australia, with Connolly visiting such places as Melbourne, Sydney and Newcastle, while the second disc focuses on Adelaide, Perth, Brisbane and rural Australia.

=== Episode guide ===
Episode 1: Connolly introduces himself and his tour with a preview of where he and his team will be heading and what they will be seeing. He kicks off his tour in October in Sydney by visiting the Harbour Bridge and giving a history of its construction and opening. While on the bridge he points out the Opera House where he performed during his stay in the city. He then takes a tour of the harbour on The Bounty, the ship used in the 1984 film of the same name featuring Mel Gibson. The boat sails past Goat Island, at which point Connolly tells the story of Charlie Anderson, a prisoner who was banished to the island. The boat eventually drops Connolly off at Doyles on the Beach restaurant in Watsons Bay, where he chats with its owner, Peter Doyle. Next, he visits the Financial District of Sydney, where he goes underground (via a "personhole cover") to visit the water-tunnels where the convicts were sent to work. The episode concludes with Connolly taking a seaplane trip to visit famous Australian artist, Ken Done.

Episode 2 starts with Connolly visiting La Perouse, Botany Bay, where Captain Cook first landed on Australian soil in 1770. He tells the story of how close Australia came to being a French colony, if not for Arthur Phillip's landing ahead of French explorer, Jean-François de Galaup, and performs a French version of "Waltzing Matilda" ("Dancing Matilde") for effect. Connolly then travels south-west to visit Australia's capital, Canberra. There he tells the history of the architecture and layout of the city, for which they had a competition that was won by a man named Walter Burley Griffin. Connolly tours the various embassies for each country in the city. He visits the original Australian Government House, built in 1927, and tells the story of the Aboriginal protests outside the house in the same year for recognition as a race. A tent-city was set up by the Aboriginal people, which was eventually driven away. A permanent tent-city was then set up by the Aboriginal people as their own embassy, and it still exists today. Other embassies he visits are the Chinese embassy, French embassy, the Indonesian embassy (where he gets "interrogated" by an officer, who was clearly a fan of the Scot, for filming on an embassy street), and a jocular "pygmy embassy", which was actually an electrical box.

Connolly then heads back to Sydney to be interviewed on the Today program. While in Sydney, he takes a walk along the harbour, watching and listening to various street performers, including a man named Johannes K. Drinda, who whistles classical music. The episode ends with Connolly climbing to the top of the Opera House, from where he tells the story of Jørn Utzon, who designed the building's exterior.

Episode 3: Connolly travels to Newcastle first, stopping en route at Nobby's Point in order to view the city on the horizon and talk about the coal mining industry in the area. From there he goes trout or salmon fishing on Stockton Beach, home of the famous MV Sygna shipwreck. He then rides his trike back to Sydney, making a detour to visit a graveyard in Maitland. There he visits the resting place of Les Darcy, a young Australian boxer who chose to visit America to fight new opponents rather than be conscripted for World War I. He died from influenza, at which point his body was brought back to Australia. This is the first of a few cemetery visits during the tour, due to Connolly's enjoyment of the stories they tell about people's lives. When he arrives back in Sydney, he takes the viewing audience on a walk from his hotel to his gig at the Opera House. Along the way he reads from various brass plaques along the eastern side of Circular Quay, with famous Australian quotes and poems engraved on them. Some of the writings he recites include "My Country" by Dorothea Mackellar, "Unreliable Memoirs" by Clive James, a poem about pie by Barry Humphries, and a quote by Germaine Greer about being homeless until Aborigines are seen as the rightful owners of Australia. Due to the nature of his walking to his show, Connolly meets and interacts with many of the members of his soon-to-be audience. He then heads to the Brett Whiteley Studio, which features many of the late artist's sculptures and paintings, many of which feature small birds and lifelike 3D sculptures. Connolly chats with Whiteley's ex-wife, Wendy Whiteley, about how her then husband bet him $100 to do two consecutive gigs without repeating a joke, which he successfully accomplished. The episode finishes with Connolly viewing more art from the studio.

Episode 4: The Big Yin rides south to Melbourne, Victoria. His first stop is the West Gate Bridge, where he tells the story about the bridge collapse in October 1970, causing the loss of life of 35 men. He then travels into the city and stops at Melbourne Gaol, where outlaw Ned Kelly was hung. Inside the jail, Connolly notes the practice of phrenology which was rife in the era of Kelly. He also points out the various torture devices that were used, including a flogging machine, kidney belt, Cat o' nine tails and anti-masturbation gloves. The final thing he points out is the Ned Kelly shrine in the prison, which documents the fall of the man and holds his personal journal.

After returning to downtown Melbourne, Connolly makes his way on foot to his gig from his hotel. On his way he notes the electronic birdsong that is piped through speakers in the city as ambiance. He next heads to Mornington Peninsula, where he tells the story of ex-Australian Prime Minister Harold Holt, who mysteriously disappeared while swimming off the peninsula. Connolly then returns to the city and boards a tram to travel through the city. He eventually hops off the tram and walks through the city, pointing out some beautification sculptures and appreciates some street-performers along the way. Another interesting artpiece he demonstrates is a metaphorical time-machine that represents the past, present and future. The episode finishes with Connolly heading to William Ricketts' Sanctuary, where he comments on some of Ricketts' artwork, most of which featured lifelike Aboriginal sculptures which represent the soul and culture of the people.

Episode 5: Connolly makes his way to Adelaide in South Australia. He visits a Jimmy Pike gallery where he views an Aboriginal dance and Aboriginal artwork. He tells the story of Pike, a famous Aboriginal artist who learned to paint in prison as a means of therapy. His next visit is to Adelaide Zoo, where he visits his favourite animal, the Hairy-nosed wombat. He then sets off to his gig from his hotel, taking the viewers on a tour along the way. He points out the Adelaide Casino, and the artistic layout for the ventilation of the South Australian Government House, before arriving at his gig next door. Later, he travels into the city to buy a pie floater.

Perth is his next stop. He describes the Western Australian capital as "the most isolated capital in the world". He describes the Aboriginal belief that the Swan River was carved out by the rainbow serpent. He then visits Kings Park where there are gum trees planted along the side of the road in dedication of every Australian man and woman who lost his or her life in war. He then travels out to Rottnest Island, called Wadjemup in Noongar. He takes a bike ride along the coast of the island until he stops by some tea trees. While describing them, some quokkas come out and pay him a visit. He then heads out into the ocean to go swimming with the dolphins. While in Perth, Connolly celebrates his 53rd birthday. His sister, Flo, and his eldest daughter, Cara, have been flown out to visit him as a surprise. The episode ends with Connolly visiting The Pinnacles, a petrified forest in Nambung National Park, north of Perth, where he does one of his world-famous nudey-dances.

Episode 6: Connolly starts by heading to Brisbane, Queensland. He drives around the city on his trike, giving a commentary on the city's political history and notable landmarks. He points out the local town hall where he was attacked by a Scottish-Australian prison officer during a gig on his first tour of Australia. He then takes a walk through a man-made rainforest in the city to his gig, pointing out the Nepal Peace Pagoda along the way. Next, he heads to the Caboolture Gliding Club on the outskirts of Brisbane to go flying in a glider. His pilot does several loops and twirls in the sky before bringing him back down, only to find out the battery ran out on the camera he took up. So he heads back up again to get the footage. Connolly then heads out to take a look at second-hand houses standing on pallets, available for sale alongside the highway. Once bought, they're placed on a truck or boat and sent to wherever the buyer wishes. He heads to a neighbourhood where several of these houses have been set up.

Connolly flies to Fraser Island, the largest sand island in the world which lies off the coast of Queensland. He tells about the trees of the rainforest that were cut down and used around the world as piles, due to their incredible height and lack of branches. The rainforest eventually became a United Nations World Heritage Site and no further logging was permitted. Connolly's next destination is Lake McKenzie, where he goes for a quick swim and spots a turtle. He then takes a drive out to the eastern beach of the island. While driving, he talks about some dingos he saw while staying on the island, and how they're the purest-bred dingoes in Australia. He arrives at the beach and the episode ends with him playing his banjo while the sun sets over the ocean.

Episode 7: Connolly travels to Coober Pedy in the hot, dusty heart of Australia. He talks about the town's Opal mining background and later visits one of the mines himself. He describes how Aboriginal Australians don't like to get involved with mining because of their closely held beliefs that their version of the Devil lives underground and lures people to their deaths with shiney, desirable stones. Billy then visits a house that was built by digging out a man-made cave and furnishing it beautifully. It was made by a woman named "Faye" and includes an underground heated swimming pool. Next he visits the famous Dingo fence, which at 5600 kilometres, is the longest fence in the world. Coober Pedy golf course is the next stop and it is notable due to the course being made completely of sand. Golfers using the course carry around a square foot of astro turf and put their ball on it to take each shot.

Connolly then rides to Alice Springs for a short visit and passes along the usually dry Todd River. He talks about the annual boat race they hold along the river which sees people make boats with no bottom and teams run along the river carrying their boats. He jokes about the fact that these races have been cancelled on occasion due to water being in the river after rainfall. Billy then goes into the outback and makes bread called Damper and tea over a fire. He then plays a song on the Autoharp to celebrate his outback culinary success. The episode finishes with Billy taking in the sights at Ayers Rock.

Episode 8: Begins with Connolly in Darwin, Northern Territory and takes his trike to the Adelaide River. Here he takes a boat trip to find Saltwater crocodiles and shows how the crocodiles leap up out of the water to reach bait at the end of a pole held by the river guide. Billy then takes a plane ride to the Bathurst and Melville Islands just north of Darwin. He meets the local indigenous people and talks about their culture and beliefs. The locals take Billy hunting for Mud Crabs in a Mangrove and later to eat worms that are found in the bark of trees. He then follows a guide called Sydney into a wooded area to try some Bush Tucker. Billy then visits the Tiwi design centre to see wood carvings and paintings and goes into the workshop to see the locals painting intricate, colourful patterns on shells and weaving dining table furniture. Next Billy returns to the mainland to a place called Shady Camp to do some barramundi fishing but his trip is cut short by a thunder storm. When the storm passes he returns to the boat and catches a "frying pan sized" barramundi and later cruises along the tranquil river during a beautiful sunset.

Finally Billy returns to Sydney to talk about the tour now that it has come to an end and what they hoped to achieve during the filming. The series ends with a montage of video clips over a recording of Billy singing an extended version of the title music.

=== Book ===
A book accompanying the series was also issued. Ghost-written by Connolly's manager's PA Claire Walsh and featuring photographs from Nobby Clark, along with screenshots from the televised series, it is dedicated to "the two Australians who have had the most profound impact on my life: my wife Pamela and the artist Brett Whiteley."

== Billy Connolly's World Tour of England, Ireland and Wales ==
World Tour of England, Ireland and Wales
- DVD box-set cover
- Created by: Billy Connolly; Nobby Clark; Steve Brown
- Starring: Billy Connolly
- Country of origin: United Kingdom
- No. of episodes: 8

Production
- Running time: 200 minutes (25 min/episode)

Original release
- Network: BBC One
- Release: 2002

Billy Connolly's World Tour of England, Ireland and Wales is the third of Scottish comedian Billy Connolly's "world tours" commissioned by the BBC. It was first aired in 2002, and was released on VHS and DVD in roughly a few months later after its initial release, with three episodes on disc one and the remaining five on disc two.

=== Episode guide ===
Episode 1: In the first episode, Connolly visits the city of Dublin, Ireland

Episode 2: Connolly visits the city of Belfast in Northern Ireland. While there, he visits a graveyard that has a wall built under the ground to keep the Protestants and Catholics apart in death.

Episode 3: While still in Ireland, Connolly visits the town of Killarney and surrounding areas.

Episode 4: Connolly's first episode to be set in England starts in the city of Newcastle upon Tyne. On his visit he gives an insight to how the Geordies got their nickname.

Episode 5: The fifth episode focuses on the nation's capital, London. Connolly climbs to the top of the Big Ben clock tower, rides down the River Thames, and performs at Shakespeare's Globe.

Episode 6: Connolly visits the cities of Manchester and Sheffield.

Episode 7: The whole episode focuses on the country of Wales, in which he visits Cardiff, the Brecon Beacons and Portmeirion.

Episode 8: In the final episode of the series, Connolly visits Bournemouth. In an almost traditional way for his World Tour Series, he strips down to nothing as he rides off on his bike during the ending credits.

=== Music ===
The closing credits of each episode feature Ralph McTell, Cara Dillon and Mary Hopkin singing verses of McTell's song, "England" (suitably adapted for 'Ireland' and 'Cymru'). Hopkin can additionally be heard singing a verse of "Bugeilio'r Gwenith Gwyn" during Episode 7. The DVD also includes audio tracks of songs performed by Connolly and Dillon, and instrumental versions of three McTell compositions (including the series' theme tune).

== Billy Connolly's World Tour of New Zealand ==
Billy Connolly's World Tour of New Zealand is set in New Zealand and aired in 2005.

World Tour of New Zealand
- Created by: Billy Connolly; Steve Brown
- Starring: Billy Connolly
- Country of origin: United Kingdom
- No. of episodes: 8

Production
- Running time: 312 minutes (39 min/episode)

Original release
- Network: BBC One
- Release: November 20, 2004 – January 8, 2005

== Ultimate World Tour ==
Ultimate World Tour was set in Florida.
