= Irish Heartbeat (song) =

Song by Van Morrison

from the album Inarticulate Speech of the Heart
- Released: March 1983
- Recorded: 1982
- Studio: Townhouse in London
- Genre: Celtic, folk rock
- Length: 4:40
- Label: Warner Bros.
- Songwriter: Van Morrison
- Producer: Van Morrison

"Irish Heartbeat" is a popular song that was first recorded on Northern Irish singer-songwriter Van Morrison's 1983 album Inarticulate Speech of the Heart. A remake with the Chieftains was also included on Morrison's 1988 album, Irish Heartbeat, and was released as a single with "Star of the County Down" as the B-side.

== Recording ==
The first version of the song, "Irish Heartbeat" that appeared on the album Inarticulate Speech of the Heart was recorded in 1982 at Townhouse in London with Mick Glossop acting as engineer. The version that was recorded with the Chieftains that was included on the album Irish Heartbeat was recorded at Windmill Lane Studios in Dublin in sessions from December 1987 to January 1988 with Brian Masterson as engineer.

== Composition ==
The song evokes images of returning to Ireland and includes the words: "I'm going back / Going back / To my own ones / Back to talk / Talk awhile / With my own ones". Van Morrison was quoted by his biographer Steven Turner as remarking: "But there's a big part of me that's= just strictly involved with the island of Ireland."

== Other releases ==
Irish Heartbeat as a remake with The Chieftains was included on the 1988 album Irish Heartbeat. This recording with The Chieftains was included on the 2007 compilation album Van Morrison at the Movies - Soundtrack Hits as it appeared on the soundtrack of the movie The Matchmaker. The original recording has been remastered in 2007 and included on the compilation album, Still on Top - The Greatest Hits.

Another version was recorded with Mark Knopfler for the 2015 release Duets: Re-working the Catalogue.

== Covers ==
- In 1988, Billy Connolly recorded a live cover of the song "Irish Heartbeat" during a Scottish tour featuring the College of Piping pipe band. After several years this recording featured on his World Tour of Scotland series. It is included on the accompanying soundtrack, Musical Tour of Scotland. The performance was used as the closing theme to the BBC series.
- Morrison's daughter Shana Morrison performed a duet of "Irish Heartbeat" with Brian Kennedy on the Van Morrison tribute album No Prima Donna: The Songs of Van Morrison.
- The Burns Sisters on their 1995 album, Close to Home
- Johnny Logan covered the song on his album, The Irish Connection 2
