= Gerry Rafferty (album) =

Compilation album by Gerry Rafferty/The Humblebums
- Released: 1974
- Recorded: 1969–1971
- Genre: Rock, folk rock
- Length: 46:55
- Label: Transatlantic
- Producer: Bill Leader, Hugh Murphy

Gerry Rafferty/The Humblebums chronology
Can I Have My Money Back? (1971)	Gerry Rafferty (1974)	City to City (1978)

Hipgnosis U.S. Cover

Professional ratings
Review scores
Source	Rating
Allmusic	3/5 stars

Gerry Rafferty, released in 1974 by Transatlantic Records (TRA 270), and reissued 1978 in the US by Visa Records (Visa 7006), is a compilation of mainly Humblebums material that Gerry Rafferty had written and performed while in that group. It comprises most of the serious musical content of the last two albums released by that group, with the exception of "So Bad Thinking", which was the B-side of his "Can I Have My Money Back?" single. The remaining content of those two albums were mostly humorous Billy Connolly compositions. All song versions on this album (except "So Bad Thinking") are available in CD form on various Humblebums compilations.

== Track listing ==
All tracks composed by Gerry Rafferty, except where indicated

1. "Shoeshine Boy" – 3:17
2. "Rick Rack" – 2:48
3. "All the Best People Do It" – 2:59
4. "Look Over the Hill and Far Away" – 3:40
5. "Blood and Glory" – 2:32
6. "Song for Simon" – 2:21
7. "I Can't Stop Now" – 4:41
8. "So Bad Thinking" – (Rafferty, Joe Egan) 3:20
9. "Patrick" – 3:22
10. "Steam Boat Row" – 2:05
11. "Her Father Didn't Like Me Anyway" – 4:35
12. "Keep It to Yourself" – 3:16
13. "Coconut Tree" – 1:57
14. "Please Sing a Song for Us" – 2:45
15. "My Singing Bird" – 3:18
