= The Pick of Billy Connolly =

Compilation album by Billy Connolly
- Released: November 1981
- Genre: Stand-up comedy
- Label: Polygram

Billy Connolly chronology
Riotous Assembly (1979)	The Pick of Billy Connolly (1981)	A Change Is as Good as a Rest (1983)

Professional ratings
Review scores
Source	Rating
Allmusic	3/5 stars

The Pick of Billy Connolly is a Billy Connolly compilation album.

== Track listing ==
The album contained the following tracks:

1. "C and W Super Song"
2. "In Appreciation (The Welly Boot March)"
3. "Scottish Highland National Dress"
4. "Welly Boot Song"
5. "When in Rome"
6. "Sexie Sadie and Lovely Raquel"
7. "Ivan the Terrible"
8. "D.I.V.O.R.C.E."
9. "Football Violence"
10. "Tell Laura I Love Her"
11. "Marvo & the Lovely Doreen"

== Charts ==
Chart (1982)	Peak position
Australian (Kent Music Report)	34
