= Billy Connolly: Journey to the Edge of the World =

2009 British television travel documentary series

- Genre: Documentary film, travel documentary
- Presented by: Billy Connolly
- Country of origin: United Kingdom
- Original language: English
- No. of episodes: 4

Production
- Production location: Canada
- Running time: 60 minutes
- Production company: ITV Studios

Original release
- Network: ITV
- Release: 19 February – 12 March 2009

Related
- Billy Connolly's Route 66

Billy Connolly: Journey to the Edge of the World is a four-part travel documentary series produced by ITV Studios, presented by Scottish comedian and actor Billy Connolly.

In the summer of 2008, Connolly travels from Halifax, Nova Scotia on the Canadian Atlantic coast through the notorious Northwest Passage to Vancouver Island on the Canadian Pacific coast. On the way he meets the people living there, participates in their cultures, and enjoys the nature and wildlife, as well as adding in some fun and comedy along the way.

The series started airing on ITV on 19 February 2009 and on Seven Network in Australia in April 2009. The DVD-release of all four episodes and a bonus feature was on 16 March 2009.

== Episode list ==
Episode No.	Airdate	Total viewers	Weekly channel ranking
1	19 February 2009	5.19m	18
2	26 February 2009	4.86m	18
3	5 March 2009	4.51m	22
4	12 March 2009	4.15m	24

== See also ==
- Billy Connolly's Route 66
