= The Humblebums =

Scottish band (1965–1971)

- Origin: Glasgow, Scotland
- Genres: Folk rock
- Years active: 1965–1971
- Label: Transatlantic
- Past members: Billy Connolly; Gerry Rafferty; Tam Harvey

The Humblebums were a Scottish folk rock band, based in Glasgow. Its members included Billy Connolly, who later became a stand-up comedian and actor; guitarist Tam Harvey; and singer-songwriter Gerry Rafferty. The band was active from 1965 to 1971.

== Career ==
Connolly co-founded the band with Tam Harvey in 1965, and played in the pubs and clubs around Glasgow, most notably the Scotia Bar on Stockwell Street. Connolly sang, played banjo and guitar, and entertained the audience with his humorous introductions to the songs. Harvey was an accomplished bluegrass guitarist. A first album, First Collection of Merry Melodies, was released in February 1969.

Rafferty joined later in 1969 and for a short time they performed as a trio. However, the nature of the act had changed and Harvey departed shortly afterwards.

The remaining duo broke up in the early 1970s after recording two more Humblebums albums of material: The New Humblebums and Open Up the Door, the former graced by a cover by John Byrne, marking the beginning of a long working relationship between Byrne and Rafferty. In 1970, the single "Shoeshine Boy" became a small hit in the Netherlands.

Connolly embarked on a solo career while Rafferty recorded a low-impact solo album, Can I Have My Money Back? Rafferty then formed Stealers Wheel with Joe Egan before eventually emerging as a major recording act with "Baker Street".

A number of songs performed by Connolly on his early comedy albums originated with the Humblebums, and actual Humblebums recordings also frequently turn up on Connolly compilations. A number of Humblebums recordings were reissued following Connolly's rise to international stardom. The Rafferty tracks from this period have been released in a variety of formats, some with just Humblebums material, others adding some or all of Can I Have My Money Back?

Gerry Rafferty died on 4 January 2011, at the age of 63. Tam Harvey died on 17 December 2021.

== Musical style ==
According to Richie Unterberger, the Humblebums were a "subdued, somewhat folk-rock duo". High Fidelity also described them as "folk-rockers", whose sound "falls somewhere between the Sarstedt brothers and Cat Stevens. Their songs all combine interesting lyrics, usually with a story line, and sprightly melodies."

== Discography ==
=== Albums ===
- First Collection of Merry Melodies (Transatlantic TRA186, February 1969)

Billy Connolly (vocals, guitar, banjo), Tam Harvey (guitar, mandolin) with Ronnie Rae (bass)

- The New Humblebums (Transatlantic TRA201, September 1969)

Billy Connolly, Gerry Rafferty

- Open Up the Door (Transatlantic TRA218, June 1970)

Billy Connolly, Gerry Rafferty

=== Singles ===
- "Saturday Round About Sunday" (BIG122, 1969)
- "Shoeshine Boy" (1970, written by Rafferty) / "My Apartment" (written by Connolly)

=== Compilation albums ===
- Gerry Rafferty (Transatlantic TRA270, 1974) compilation album from the second and third Humblebums albums
- The Complete Humblebums (Transatlantic TRA288, 1974) 3 LPs
- The Humblebums (MTRA2008, 1979)
- The Best of the Humblebums (Pulse PDSCD542, 1996) 2-CD set
- The Humblebums (ESMCD498, 1997) single disc containing all of the second and third albums
- Please Sing a Song for Us: The Transatlantic Anthology (Castle CMDDD1211, 2005) 2-CD set of all three albums, singles tracks (single version of 'Saturday Round About Sunday' and B-side 'Bed of Mossy Green', with previously unreleased material (five out-takes from the 'Open Up the Door' sessions) and four tracks from a Radio 1 session.

This set (now out of print) was re-released (Talking Elephant TECD 400, 2018) minus the four Radio 1 Session tracks.

== See also ==
- Billy Connolly: Transatlantic Years (Compilation)
