= St Peter's Boys School, Glasgow =

Coordinates: 55.872°N 4.305°W

St. Peter's Boys School

Location
- Stewartville Street; Partick; Scotland

Information
- Type: primary and advanced education
- Religious affiliation: Roman Catholic
- Local authority: Glasgow
- Gender: Boys
- Age: 4 to 12

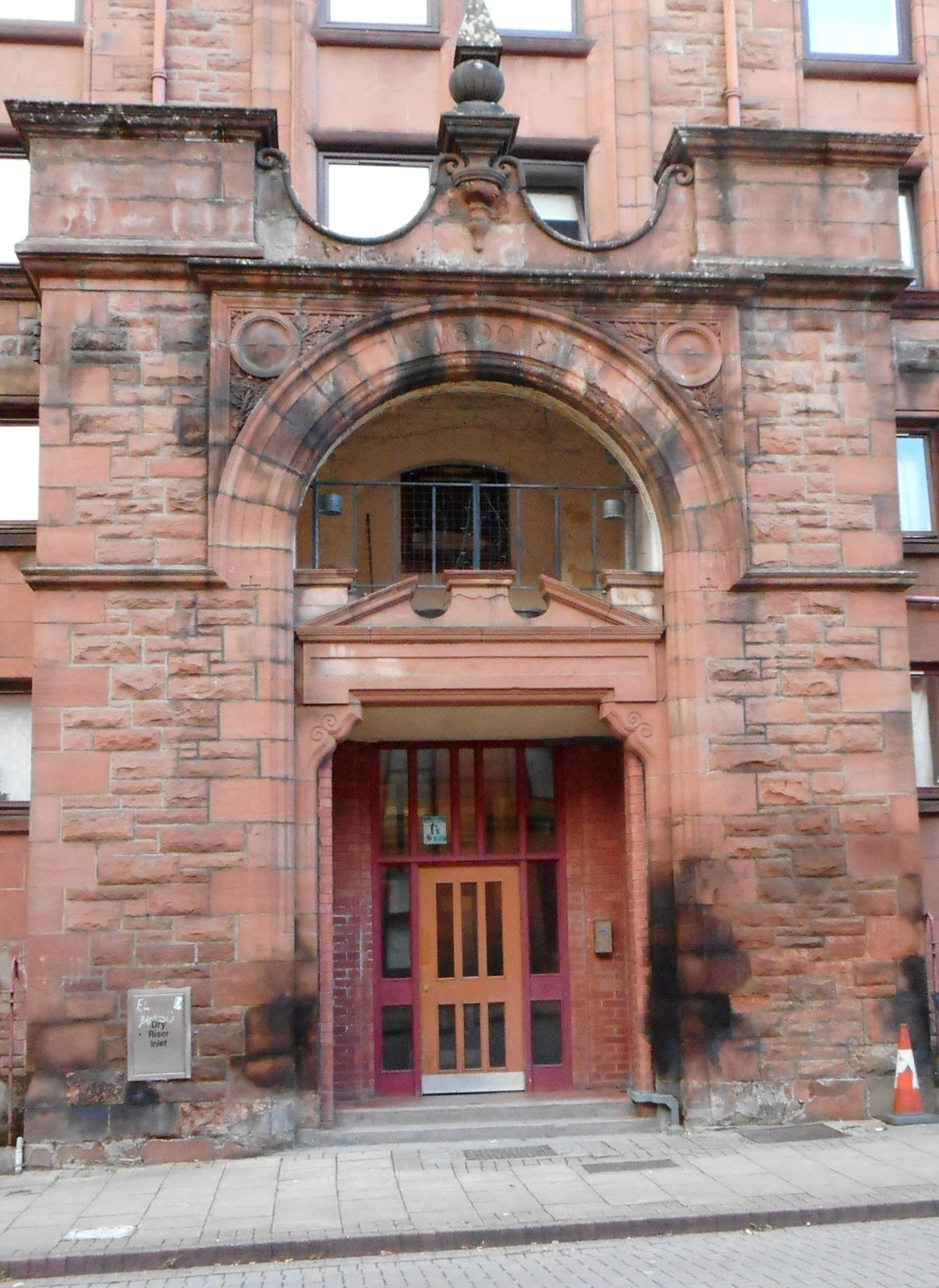
Entrance of the school

St Peter's Boys School was a Roman Catholic school in Stewartville Street, Partick, Scotland. It is no longer a school, having merged with Notre Dame Primary School in 2013. The building has been converted into a block of flats and the old playgrounds are residents' car parks.

== Notable pupils ==
- Billy Connolly
- Armando Iannucci
- Tosh McKinlay
