= Musical Tour of Scotland =

Studio album by Billy Connolly
- Released: 1995
- Genre: Folk
- Length: 51:57
- Label: Tickety-Boo
- Producer: Graham Preskett

Professional ratings
Review scores
Source	Rating
AllMusic	3/5 stars

Musical Tour of Scotland is a collection of traditional and original songs and tunes which accompanied Billy Connolly's 1994 television series World Tour of Scotland. It was released in 1995.

Connolly provides vocals on "The Waltzing Fool", "I Wish I Was in Glasgow" and "Irish Heartbeat". Ralph McTell, meanwhile, sings on "Will Ye Go", "The Islands", "Tangle of the Isles" and "Flower of Scotland". The remaining ten songs are instrumentals.

"I Wish I Was in Glasgow" was written by Connolly in 1983 and released on his album A Change Is as Good as Arrest. With the lines "I would take you there and show you, but they've pulled the building down" and "they bulldozed it all to make a road", he laments that the section of Dover Street, between Breadalbane and Claremont Streets, on which he was born was demolished around a decade earlier. This version omits the first verse: Oh I wish I was in Glasgow / With some good old friends of mine / Some good old rough companions / And some good old smooth red wine / We could talk about the old days / And the shipyard's sad decline / And drink to the boys on the road. Also, on the rare occasions he performed the song live, prior to its inclusion here, friends became pals, and and when I think about it, became and any time it's in my mind.

"I was a bit depressed about Glasgow when I wrote it, but since then it has cheered up somewhat," Connolly said prior to a performance of the song in the late 1980s. In World Tour of Scotland, he added, "It's as if someone worked out how to use [Glasgow's] skylight."

All but the final song, a live cover of Van Morrison's "Irish Heartbeat", are studio recordings. "Barges" is an instrumental version of a McTell-penned song that originally appeared on his 1972 album Not till Tomorrow. "Irish Heartbeat" was performed during Connolly's 1988 tour. Connolly, playing acoustic guitar, is joined on stage by female backing vocalist Julienne Taylor and, from the bridge onwards, by the College of Piping pipe band. The song was limited-released as a single.

Connolly, who had been a folk musician in the 1960s and early 1970s and included musical interludes in his comedy albums and performances up until 1983, had mostly phased music out of his performances by the late 1980s.

== Track listing ==
1. "Banjo Land" (Trad. arr. Graham Preskett)
2. "The Islands Theme" (Ralph McTell)
3. "The Waltzing Fool" (Lyle Lovett; trad. arr. Billy Connolly)
4. "Tangle of the Isles Theme"† (Trad. arr. Graham Preskett)
5. "I Wish I Was in Glasgow" (Trad. arr. Billy Connolly)
6. "Flower of Scotland Theme" (Roy Williamson)
7. "Campbell's Farewell" (Trad. arr. Billy Connolly)
8. "Will Ye Go" (Trad. arr Graham Preskett, performed by Ralph McTell)
9. "From Here to Claire" (Trad. arr. Graham Preskett)
10. "The Islands" (Ralph McTell/Martin Allcock, performed by Ralph McTell)
11. "Waltz of the Waves"†† (Trad. arr. Billy Connolly)
12. "Tangle of the Isles"† (Trad. arr. Graham Preskett, performed by Ralph McTell)
13. "Barges" (Ralph McTell)
14. "Flower of Scotland" (Roy Williamson, performed by Ralph McTell)
15. "Glasgow Theme" (Trad. arr. Billy Connolly)
16. "Will Ye Go Theme" (Trad. arr. Graham Preskett)
17. "Irish Heartbeat" (Van Morrison, performed by Billy Connolly)

†The original song is known as "The Road to the Isles". The line the tangle o' the isles appears in the song. This version omits the middle verse.
†† In 1998, Harvey Reid claimed ownership of this song in a letter to Connolly, a claim to which Connolly agreed. No royalty payments ever occurred, however.

== Musical credits ==
- Billy Connolly – banjo, autoharp, vocals
- Ralph McTell – guitar, vocals
- Graham Preskett – piano, violin, arrangement

== Production credits ==
- Graham Preskett - Musical production
- Cameron McBride - Recording engineer
