= Danny Kyle =

Scottish folk singer-songwriter

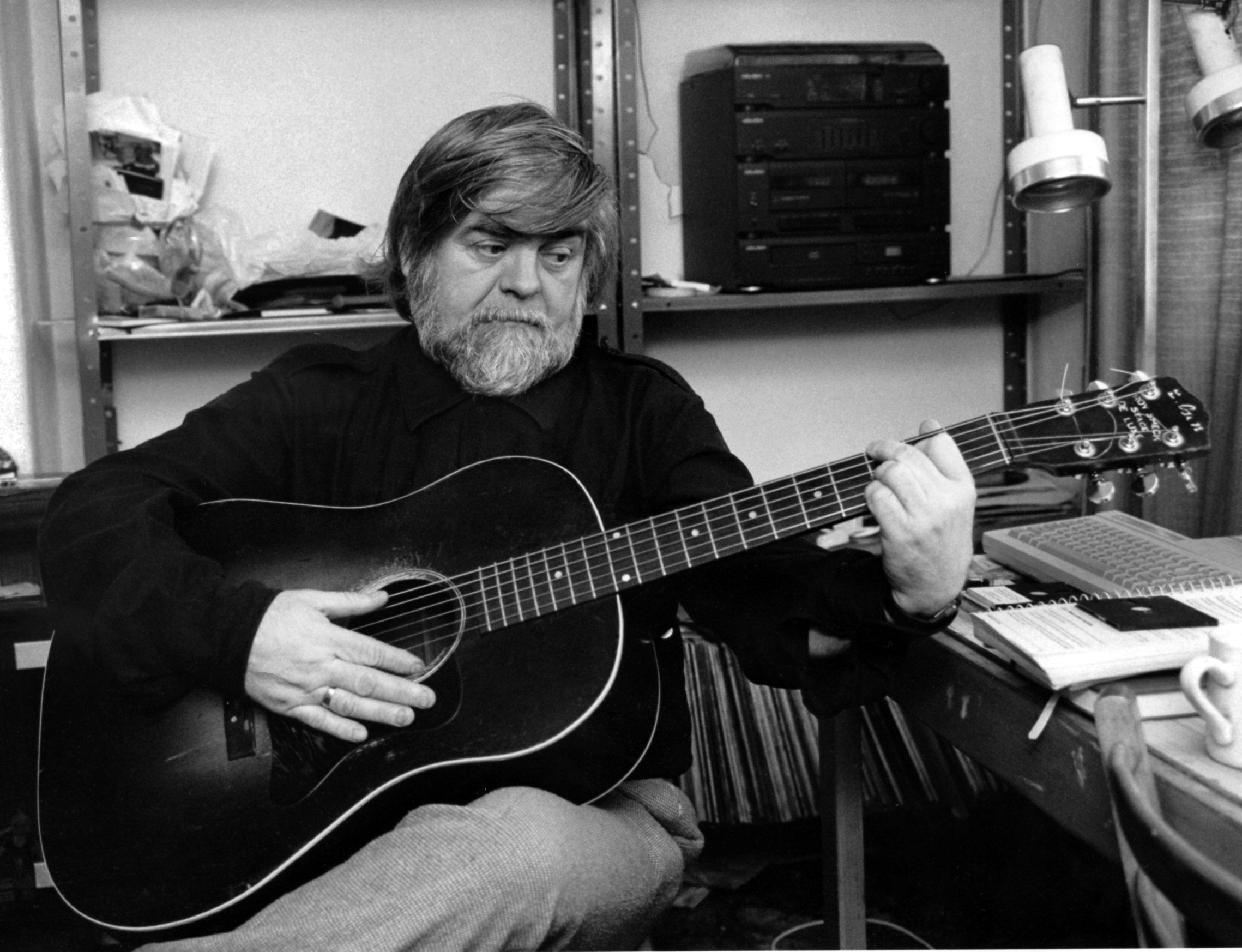
Danny Kyle taken a few months before his death in 1998.

Danny Kyle (12 December 1939 – 5 July 1998) was a Scottish folk singer-songwriter. He was a supporter of traditional music and a campaigner for its revival in Scotland. Kyle was an important figure in the Scottish Folk Revival of the sixties.

== Biography ==
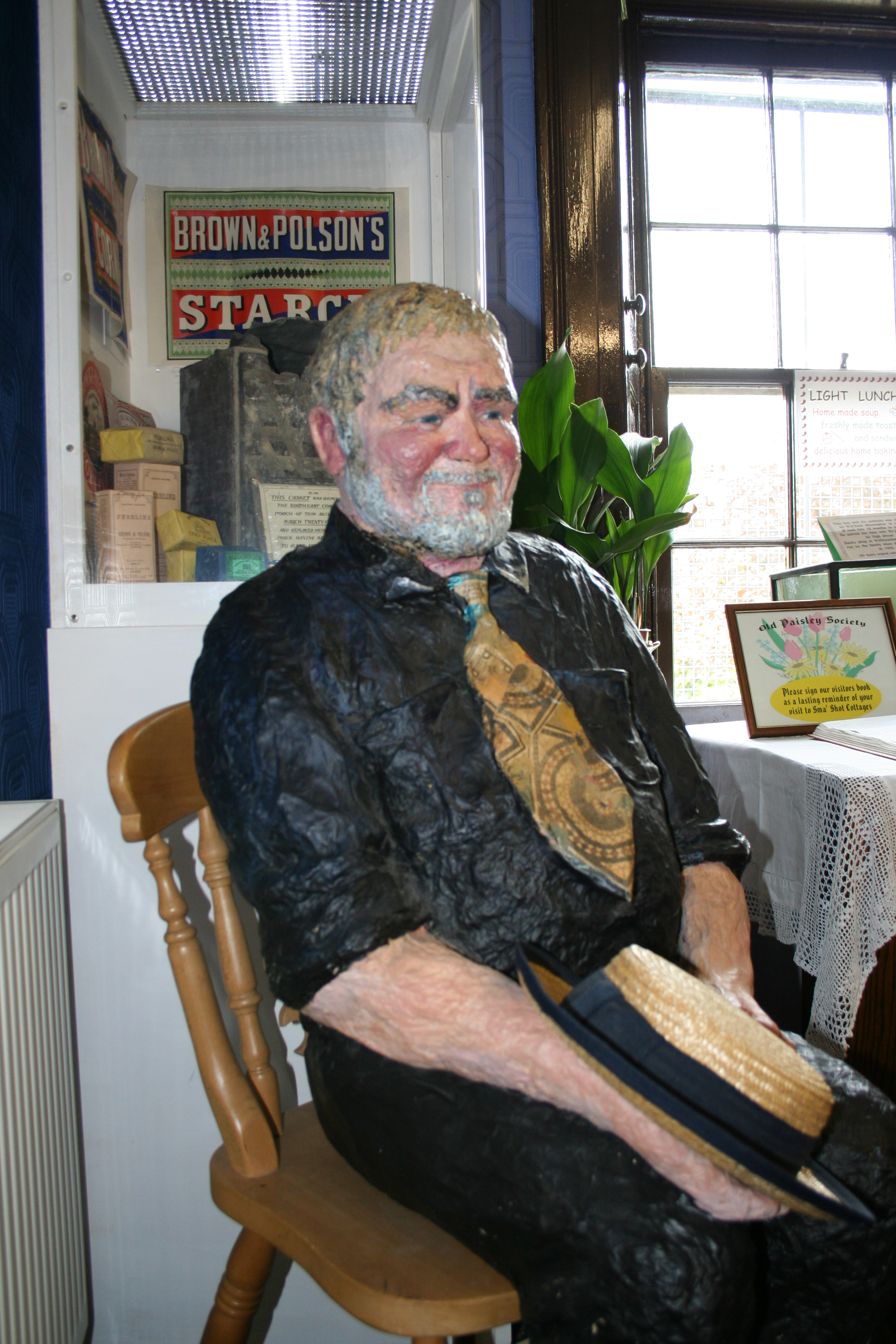
This figure of Danny Kyle is usually installed next to the Open Stage during the Celtic Connections festival

Kyle was born in Paisley, Scotland, in 1939 and he was brought up in a two-bed tenement in McKerrell Street with his three sisters. Later on in his childhood the family moved to Renfrew Road, where he lived until his death in the summer of 1998.

At 15 years old Kyle left school and went to work at Babcock International in Renfrew as an apprentice engineer. In the early 1960s, Kyle started his career as a folk singer and entertainer on the flourishing folk club circuit, during the booming folk revival. Kyle was soon one of the most influential and popular figures on the circuit. Kyle teamed up with Tich Frier, Mike Whelans, Malky McCormick and Bill Nolan to form the Vindscreen Vipers.

Popular as he was, Kyle only recorded two albums: Ah'll Get Ye in 1975 (foreword by Billy Connolly) and Heroes & Soft Targets in 1998.

The Danny Kyle Open Stage has become an integral event as part of the annual Celtic Connections festival in Glasgow. "Named after the legendary Paisley folk musician, the stage continues to celebrate Danny’s ethos of finding new talent". Danny Kyle first ran a competition at the festival in 1998, the year of his death.

Kyle died on 5 July 1998, aged 58.

== Discography ==
- Ah'll Get Ye (Pan Audio, 1975)
- Heroes & Soft Targets (1998, Iona Records)
