= Transatlantic Years =

Compilation album by Billy Connolly
- Released: 2001
- Genre: Folk music, comedy
- Label: Sanctuary

Cover of the 2002 reissue celebrating Connolly's 60th birthday

Transatlantic Years is a double compilation album by Billy Connolly, released in 2001 on Sanctuary Records. It includes material recorded between 1969 and 1974, both with Connolly as a solo act and also as a member of the Humblebums, either with Gerry Rafferty or Tam Harvey (or, for a short period, both).

The liner notes include an anthology written by Shaun Stallard.

== Track listing ==
=== CD One ===
1. "Everybody Knows That" (with the Humblebums, 1969)
2. "Little Blue Lady" (with the Humblebums, 1969)
3. "Saltcoats at the Fair" (with the Humblebums, 1969)
4. "Silk Pyjamas" (with the Humblebums, 1969)
5. "Why Don't They Come Back to Dunoon?" (King, Connolly) (with the Humblebums, 1969)
6. "Cruisin'" (with the Humblebums, 1969)
7. "A Little of Your Time" (live, with the Humblebums, 1970)
8. "Glasgow Central" (Devers, Padmore, Connolly) (live, 1972)
9. "Good Love" (live, 1972)
10. "McGinty" (live, 1972)
11. "Near You" (live, 1972)
12. "Oh, Dear" (Trad., Connolly) (live, 1972)
13. "Song for a Small Man" (live, 1972; believe to be about Connolly's best friend Danny Kyle)
14. "Stainless Steel Wellies" (introduced by Connolly as "Govan Dunne Blues") (live, 1972)
15. "Telling Lies" (live, 1972)
16. "The Donkey" (live, 1972)
17. "Winchburgh Junction" (Trad. Arr. Connolly) (live, 1972)
18. "If It Wasnae for Your Wellies" (Trad. Arr. Connolly) (live, 1972)
19. "Talkin' Blues (What's in a Name)" (live, 1974)
20. "The Short Haired Police Cadet" (Kingsley, Connolly, Blackburn) (live, 1974)

=== CD Two ===
All tracks recorded live in 1974 and written by Connolly, except where stated otherwise.

  1. "Glasgow Accents"
  2. "9½ Guitars" (Mills)
1. "Marie's Wedding"
  1. "The Music Teacher"
  2. "Campbell's Farewell to Redcastle" (Trad. Arr. Connolly)
  3. "Soldier's Joy" (Trad. Arr. Connolly)
  4. "Marie's Wedding" (Trad. Arr. Connolly)
2. "Harry Campbell and the Heavies"
  1. "Harry Campbell and the Heavies"
  2. "The World is Waiting for the Sunrise" (Seitz, Lockhart)
3. "Nobody's Child" (Connolly)
  1. "A Life in the Day of"
  2. "Glasgow Central" (Devers, Padmore, Connolly)
4. "Leo Maguire's Song" (Maguire)
5. "The Crucifixion"
  1. "The Jobbie Wheecha"
  2. "Please Help Me, I'm Falling" (Blair, Robertson)
