= Malky McCormick =

Scottish cartoonist (1943–2019)

Malky McCormick (1943 – 15 April 2019) was a Scottish cartoonist, comics artist, postcard artist, caricaturist and musician.

== Biography ==
After leaving the commercial art world in 1965, he illustrated comics and magazines for D.C. Thomson in Dundee then became a graphic artist and designer with Scottish Television for three years. In 1975, along with friend and fellow banjo player Billy Connolly, he devised and wrote the successful cartoon strip, The Big Yin for the Sunday Mail. Subsequently, McCormick contributed to many Scottish and UK national newspapers including The Sun, Daily Record, Daily Express, Sunday Times, Sunday Telegraph and New Statesman. His work illustrated several major national advertising campaigns.

As a skilled banjo player, he was a member of the Scottish skiffle group, the Vindscreen Vipers, and contributed the artwork for the album Ah'll Get Ye! by Danny Kyle, another member of the group.

His caricature skill got him invited to corporate events in Jamaica, Canada, Croatia, Germany, Romania, Kuwait, India and Russia. For ten years he was resident cartoonist on ITV's networked quiz show, Win, Lose or Draw.

He was a key player in organising the National Cartoon Festival which was held annually in Ayr, Scotland between 1998 and 2002, and was a regular after-dinner speaker. His stand-up comedy presentation focused on instant sketches of his audience.

== Personal life ==
McCormick and his wife Ann had three children: Jane, Sean, and Dominic.

McCormick died of vascular dementia on 15 April 2019 at a care centre in Ayrshire. He was preceded in death by his wife and is survived by his children.
