= Billy Connolly's Musical Tour of New Zealand =

Soundtrack album by Billy Connolly John McCusker
- Released: 2004
- Recorded: 2004
- Genre: Folk
- Label: Pure
- Producer: John McCusker

Billy Connolly's Musical Tour of New Zealand is the soundtrack to the television series Billy Connolly's World Tour of New Zealand, released in 2004.

== Track listing ==
1. Billy's Bobby Theme
2. Billy's Fast Waltz
3. Billy's Slow Waltz
4. Billy's Reel
5. Banjo Reel
6. Wandering Soul
7. Billy's Breton
8. Shaeffer's Jig
9. Billy's Strathspey
10. The Rose of Sharon
11. Billy's Jig
12. Carnival of Venice
13. Billy's Slow air
14. Billy's March
15. The Cuckoo
16. The Rose of Sharon 2
17. Pokarekare ana
