= Piece to camera =

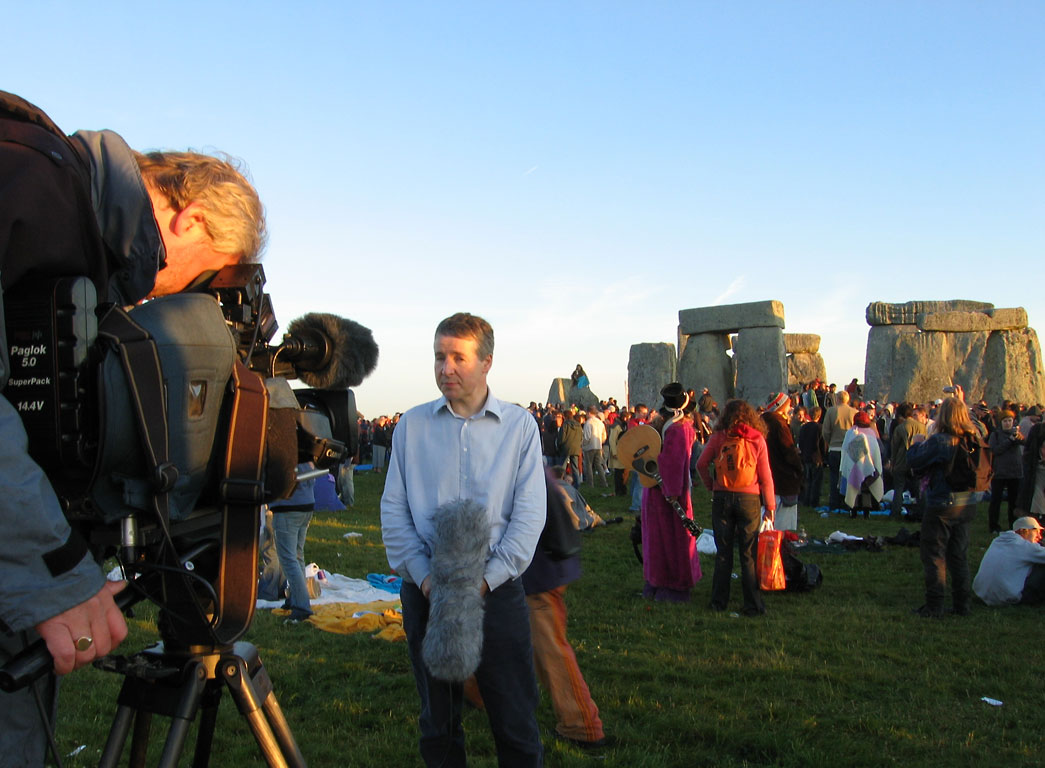
A television reporter records a piece to camera shortly after sunrise at Stonehenge

In television and film, a piece to camera (PTC) is when a television presenter or a character speaks directly to the viewing audience through the camera.

== Details ==
It is most common when a news or television show presenter is reporting or explaining items to the viewing audience. Indeed, news programmes usually take the form of a combination of both interviews and pieces to camera. There are three types of piece to camera:

1. opening PTC - when presenter opens-up the news, and introduce himself/herself to the audience.
2. bridge PTC - information that presenter gives to bridge the gap between empty space.
3. conclusive or closing PTC - ending of news where the presenter acknowledge itself and the cameraman, place and the news channel.

The term also applies to the period when an actor, playing a fictional character in a film or on television, talks into the camera and hence directly to the audience. Depending on the genre of the show, this may or may not be considered as a breaking the fourth wall.
