= Devils Rope Barbed Wire Museum =

Barbed wire museum in McLean, Texas

Coordinates: 35.2315°N 100.5973°W

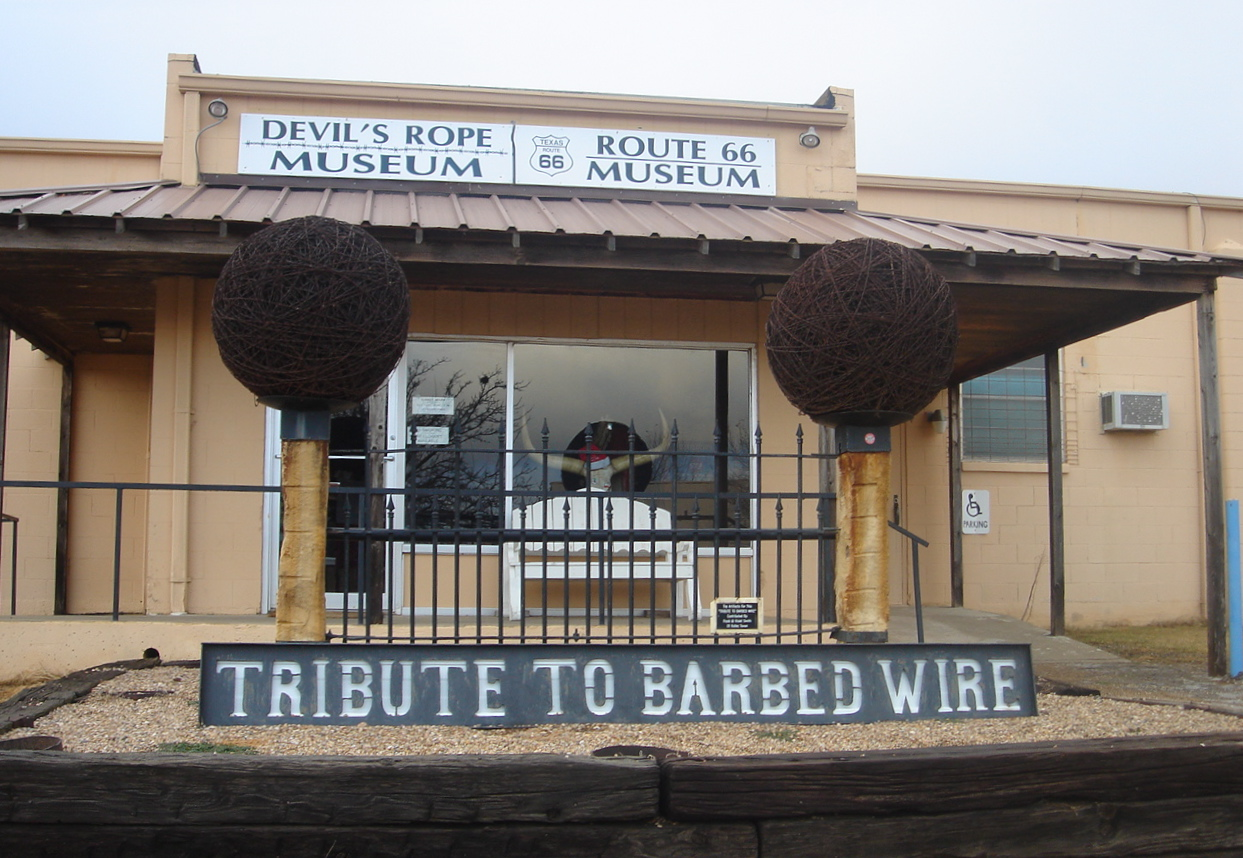
The entrance to the museum

The Devils Rope Barbed Wire Museum is a museum located in McLean, Texas, United States. The museum was officially opened in 1991 and focuses on barbed wire and its history. The museum is thought to have the largest collection of published material concerning barbed wire.

The Devil's Rope Museum is housed in a converted brassiere factory and is dedicated to the history of barbed wire, fencing tools, and ranching heritage. Features exhibits and collections from private wire collectors from across the U.S, a reference library with extensive patent information for researchers and educators, a Dust Bowl exhibit, salesman samples, warfare wire, and a collection of road lore with artifacts dedicated to the Texas portion of Historic Route 66.
