= Grice House =

Grice House may refer to:

- Grice House Museum, Harbor Beach, Michigan, listed on the National Register as James and Jane Grice House
- Milford (Camden, North Carolina), also known as Relfe-Grice-Sawyer House
- Grice-Fearing House, Elizabeth City, North Carolina

== See also ==
- Grice Inn, Wrightsville, Georgia, listed on the National Register of Historic Places in Johnson County, Georgia
- Grice (disambiguation)
