= Gries =

Gries may refer to:

== Places ==
- Gries am Brenner, a municipality in Tyrol, Austria
- Gries, Bas-Rhin, a municipality in the department Bas-Rhin, France
- Gries im Sellrain, a municipality in Tyrol, Austria
- Gries, Germany, a municipality in Rhineland-Palatinate, Germany
- Gries (Graz), the 5th city district of Graz, Austria
- Gries-San Quirino (German: Gries-Quirein), a borough of Bozen-Bolzano, Italy
  - Muri-Gries Abbey, Bolzano
  - Old Parish Church of Gries, Bolzano
- Gries Glacier (Griesgletscher), a 5 km long glacier (2005) situated in the Lepontine Alps in the canton of Valais in Switzerland
- Gries Pass, a mountain pass in the Alps, between Switzerland and Italy
- Corno Gries, a mountain in the Lepontine Alps on the Swiss -Italian border

== Surname ==
- David Gries (born 1939), computer scientist at Cornell University
- Ekkehard Gries (1936–2001), German politician
- Gerhard Gries (born 1955), German ecologist
- Jon Gries (born 1957), American actor, writer and director
- Moses J. Gries (1866–1918), American rabbi
- Peter Gries, Harold J. & Ruth Newman Chair in US-China Issues and Director of the Institute for U.S.-China Issues
- Theo Gries (born 1961), German football coach and a retired player
- Tom Gries (1921–1977), American TV and film director, writer and producer
- Roger William Gries (born 1937), American Catholic bishop
- Stefan Th. Gries (born 1970), (Full) Professor of Linguistics at the University of California, Santa Barbara

== See also ==
- Grice (disambiguation)
- Griese (disambiguation)
- Robert Griess (born 1945), American mathematician
