= Grice (disambiguation) =

Grice commonly refers to:

- Grice, an extinct breed of pig from Scotland and Ireland
- Paul Grice, British philosopher of language

It may also refer to:

- Grice, slang for trainspotting ('griceing').

== People ==
=== Grice ===
- Allan Grice, Australian former racing driver
- Christine Grice, judge of New Zealand and the Cook Islands
- Ettalene M. Grice, American Assyriologist
- Frank Grice, English professional footballer
- Gary Grice, better known by his stage name, GZA, American hip hop artist
- Gigi Gryce, American saxophonist, flautist, clarinetist, composer, arranger, educator, and big band bandleader
- Gordon Grice, American nature writer and essayist
- Jeffrey Grice, New Zealand musician
- John Grice, Australian business man
- Kliti Grice, Australian scientist
- Matt Grice, American mixed martial artist
- Mike Grice, English footballer
- Neve Grice (1881–1950), English footballer
- Paul Grice (1913–1988), British philosopher of language
- Grice Peters, also known mononymously as Grice, English musician
- Reuben Grice, English professional association football player
- Rory Grice, New Zealand rugby union player
- Ryan Grice-Mullen, American Football player
- Warren Grice Elliott, president of the Atlantic Coast Line Railroad
- Marie Grice Young, passenger on the RMS Titanic and a piano teacher

=== Le Grice ===
- Le Grice, surname

== Fictional characters ==
- Judge Grice, a fictional character in the Judge Dredd comic strip.

== See also ==
- Grice House (disambiguation)
