= Michael Pacher =

Austrian painter and sculptor (c. 1435 – 1498)

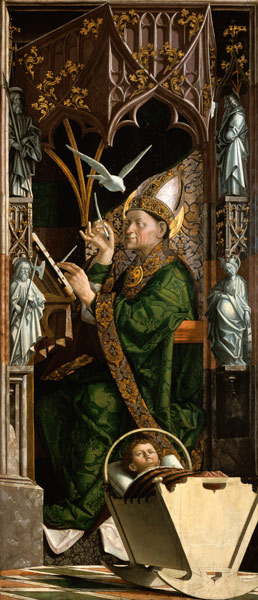
- Altarpiece of the Church Fathers right panel showing Saint Ambrose, 1471–75, Alte Pinakothek, Munich
- Born: c. 1435; Tyrol
- Died: August 1498
- Notable work: St. Wolfgang Altarpiece, Altarpiece of the Church Fathers
- Style: Italian Renaissance, Northern Gothic

Michael Pacher (c. 1435 – August 1498) was a painter and sculptor from Tyrol active during the second half of the fifteenth century. He was one of the earliest artists to introduce the principles of Renaissance painting into Germany. Pacher was a comprehensive artist with a broad range of sculpting, painting, and architecture skills producing works of complex wood and stone. He painted structures for altarpieces on a scale unparalleled in North European art.

Pacher's masterpiece, the St. Wolfgang Altarpiece (1471–1481), is considered one of the most remarkable carved and painted altar shrines in all of European art. It contains scenes from the life of Jesus and the Virgin Mary. Pacher's other great work, the Altarpiece of the Church Fathers, created in 1483 for Neustift Monastery, combined painting and sculpture to produce a unique art form.

Pacher's influence was primarily North Italian, and his work shares characteristics with that of painters such as Andrea Mantegna. German influences, however, are also evident in his work, especially in his wood sculpture. Pacher's fusion of Italian Renaissance and Northern Gothic realism helped him to produce a uniquely personal style of painting.

== Early life and influences ==
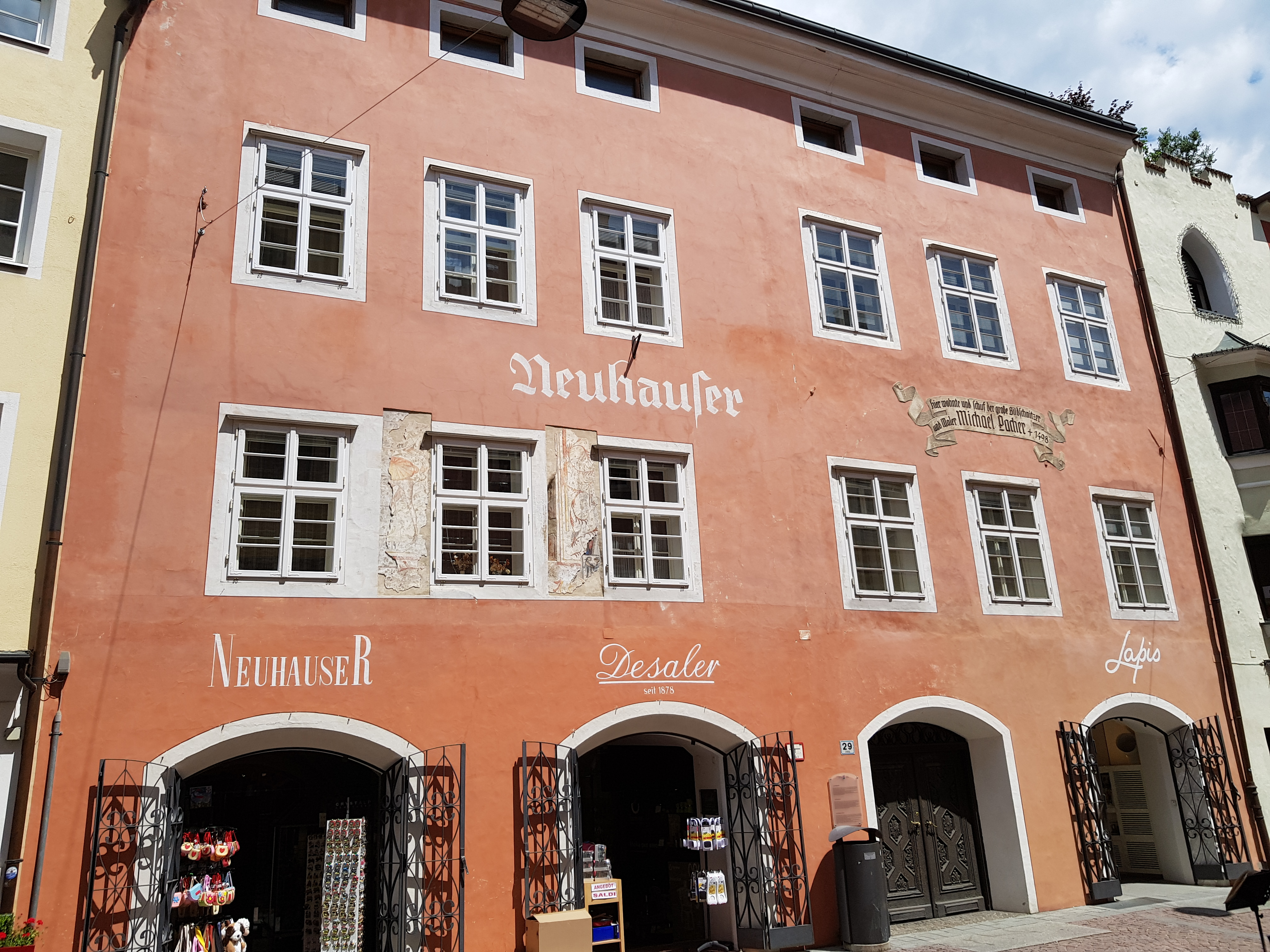
Stadtgasse 29, Bruneck, house and workplace of Pacher. The banderole on the facade says "hier wohnte und schuf der große Bildschnitzer und Maler Michael Pacher †1498"

Pacher was born around 1435 near Brixen on the southern slopes of the Alps in the County of Tyrol. Little is known of his training. His earliest recorded work is an altarpiece that was dated 1465 and signed, but which is now lost. Pacher visited Padua in northern Italy, where he became heavily influenced by the modern fresco work of Andrea Mantegna. Mantegna was considered the renowned master of perspective, whose stunning, low-set standpoint spatial compositions were important to the development of Pacher's own style. Pacher's Italian influences set him apart from most German artists of the time.

== Career ==
By 1467, Pacher was a distinguished artist and sculptor in Bruneck, twenty-five miles east of Brixen in the Puster Valley, where he had a workshop for making altarpieces; the house still exists. His skill in wood carving and painting provided him with employment for German style altars. They usually consisted of carved figural centerpieces, carved Gothic summits on top, a platform where the altar stands below, and painted scenes on panel wings. Pacher spent much of his time during the 1470s in Neustift by Brixen, where his work mainly consisted of painting frescoes. In 1484 he was commissioned by the Franciscan Order in Salzburg, to create an altarpiece, portions of which are still extant. Many of Pacher's works have been destroyed or badly damaged, some of them during the hostilities in the late 17th century, others in 1709. Notable examples of his surviving works include the St. Wolfgang Altarpiece and the Altarpiece of the Church Fathers.

=== St. Wolfgang Altarpiece ===
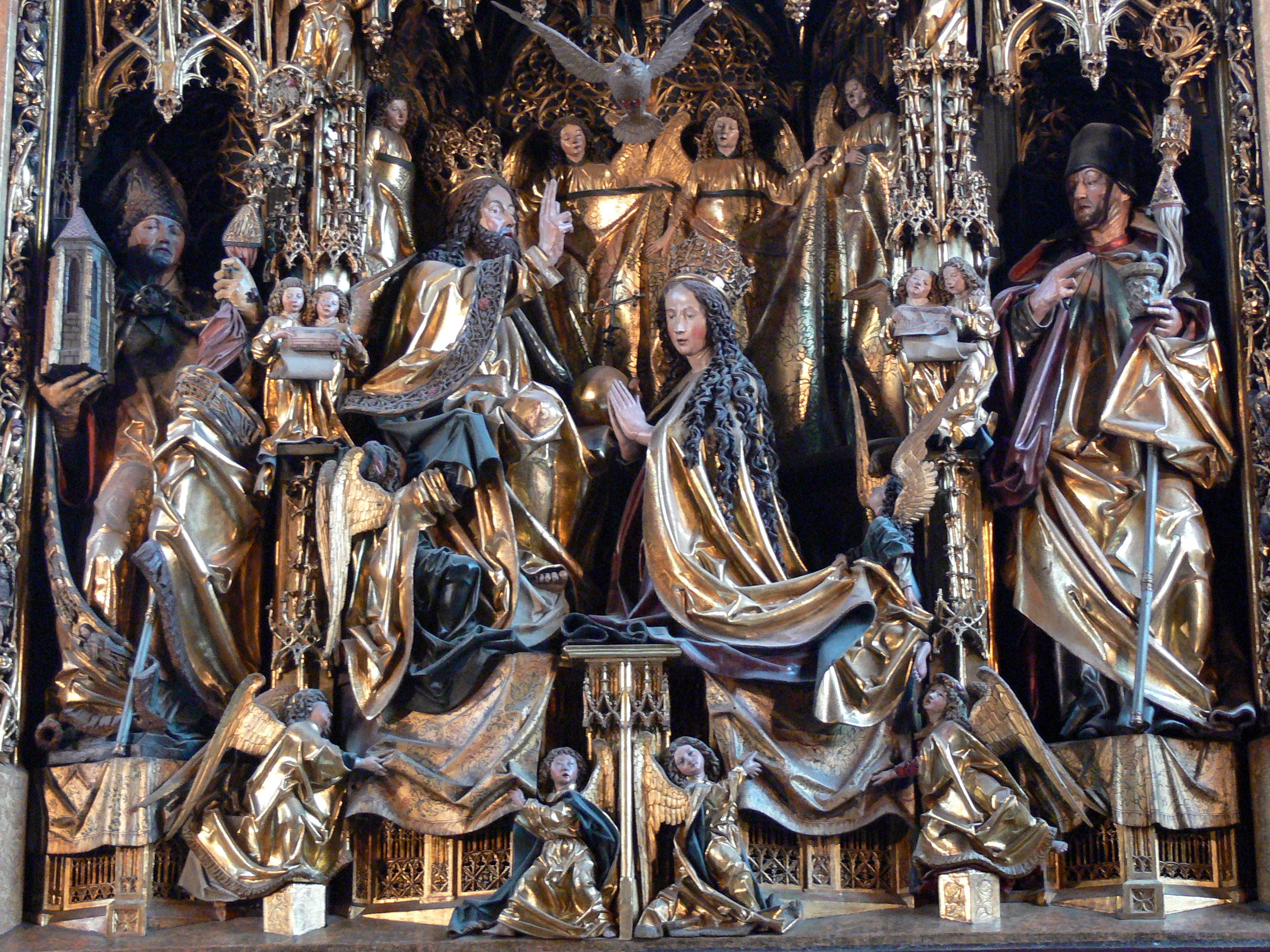
Coronation of the Virgin Mary, centerpiece of the St. Wolfgang Altarpiece

Arguably his most well-known work, the St. Wolfgang Altarpiece, remains in its original location and setting in St. Wolfgang im Salzkammergut on the Abersee (the western end of lake Wolfgangsee) in Austria. The altarpiece is a polyptych, or Wandelaltar, where a painting is divided into four or more segments or panels. There are two pairs of movable wings, and three different displays for use on different occasions: an everyday display, a Sunday display, and a display for special holy days.

Commissioned for Abbot Benedict Eck of Mondsee in 1471 and completed in 1481, the giant polyptych has two sets of wings that can be closed across the inner corpus with the sculptured Coronation presenting a majestic array of huge Gothic figures dominated by the beautifully kneeling Madonna. The carved and painted gold centerpiece is visible when the inner panels are open, and shows the Coronation of the Virgin. The outer two pairs of painted wings represent four scenes of Saint Wolfgang. Wolfgang was appointed as bishop Benedictine of Ratisbon, where he established himself radiantly for his revolutionary passions and also for his skills as statesman.

The entire altarpiece is overshadowed by an elaborate wooden structure that is placed on top, enclosing the Crucifixion. In the centerpiece, Christ is sitting on a throne sincerely blessing Mary, whom he has crowned as the Queen of Heaven. In keeping with the traditions of German Gothic art, angels are fluttering around while John the Evangelist looks on. The inner faces of the second panels, on both sides of the carved body, are painted with scenes from the life of the Virgin.

Some scholars believe that Pacher was not the only artist who has contributed to this very large altarpiece. His brother Friedrich Pacher may have painted the outer pieces of work depicting scenes from the life of Saint Wolfgang that are visible only when the altarpiece is closed shut. Nevertheless, the inner paintings all seem to have been completed by Michael Pacher himself.

=== Altarpiece of the Church Fathers ===
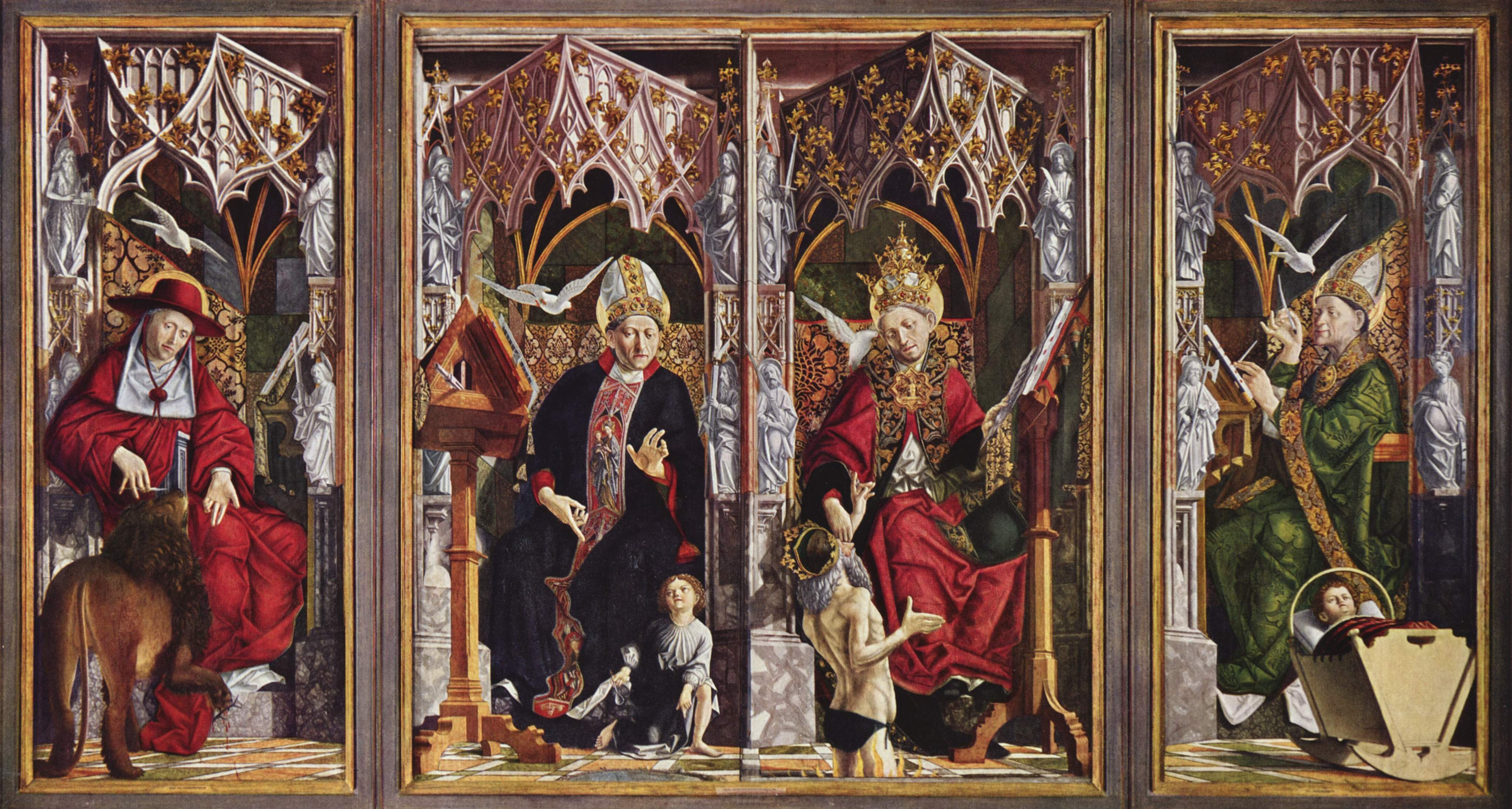
Jerome, Augustine, Gregory, and Ambrose, from the Altarpiece of the Church Fathers (1483–84), Alte Pinakothek, Munich

The Altarpiece of the Church Fathers, created in 1483 for Neustift Monastery, is probably Pacher's second most famous work. The significance in this work by Pacher lies in that the boundary between painting and sculpture was no longer clear.

The Altarpiece of the Church Fathers is divided into four sections, with each section depicting one of the four Great Doctors of the Western Church: Ambrose, Augustine, Jerome, and Pope Gregory I. On the very left is the altarpiece of Saint Jerome, who is depicted in his cardinal's attire. Jerome, who is well known for a story in which he drew a thorn from a lion's paw, is indeed accompanied by the lion in Pacher's work. To his right is the panel of Augustine, portrayed with the child from a legend about Augustine. According to this legend, Augustine was walking along a beach one day when he saw a child scooping up the water with a spoon. When Augustine asked the child what he was doing, the child replied by saying that his own activity was as pointless as Augustine's attempts to understand the concept of the Holy Trinity with his rational mind.

To Augustine's right is Pope Gregory I, depicted with Emperor Trajan, for whom Gregory I is known to have prayed to restore dead Trajan's soul and baptized his soul in order to deliver him from purgatory. On the very right is the archbishop Ambrose, shown with a baby in a cradle, which probably symbolizes a legend regarding his life: when Ambrose was in his cradle as a baby, a swarm of bees covered his face and left a drop of honey. Ambrose's father took it as a sign of Ambrose's future ability as an eloquent speaker (sweet-tongue). Another interpretation of the child in a cradle is that it was a child who requested that Ambrose be bishop of Milan. Each the four Church Fathers are depicted with a dove, symbolizing the presence of the Holy Spirit in order to represent their holiness.

== Death ==
Michael Pacher died in August 1498, possibly in Salzburg, Austria.

== Works ==
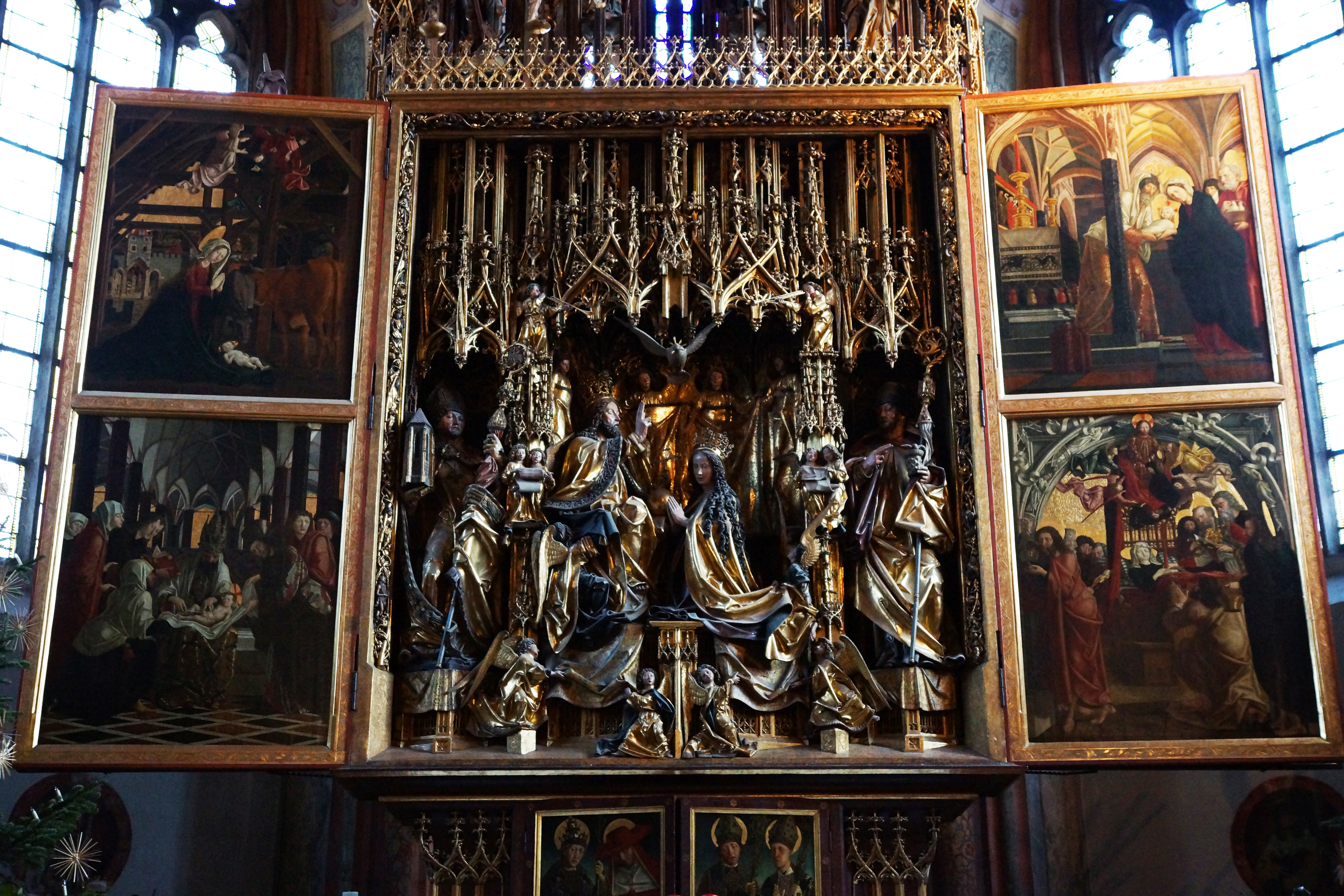
St. Wolfgang Altarpiece, 1481

The following works are attributable to Michael Pacher.

- St. Thomas Becket Altar, Johanneum, Graz, 1465
- Statue of the Virgin, Parish Church, St. Lorenzen im Pustertal, c. 1465
- Wing panels, Parish Church, St. Lorenzen im Pustertal, c. 1465
- Frescoes on the Vaulting, Sacristy, Neustift Abbey, Italy, 1469–70
- Tabernacle, Welsberg-Taisten, Italy, c. 1470
- Flight into Egypt, Kunstmuseum Basel, c. 1470
- St. Wolfgang Altarpiece, Parish Church, St. Wolfgang im Salzkammergut, Austria, 1471–81
- Altar of the Coronation of the Virgin, Old Parish Church of Gries, Bolzano, Italy, 1475
- Statue of the Virgin and Child, Old Parish Church of Gries, Bolzano, Italy
- Frescoes Above the South Door, Collegiate Church, Innichen, Italy, c. 1480
- Altarpiece of the Church Fathers, Alte Pinakothek, Munich, 1480–83
- Statue of Saint Lawrence, Tyrolean State Museum, Innsbruck, c. 1480–90
- Statue of Saint Michael, Bavarian National Museum, Munich, 1482–84
- Crucifix, National Museum, Warsaw, c. 1490
- Four Panels with Heads of Saints, Wilten Abbey, Innsbruck
- High Altar, Franciscan Church, Salzburg, c. 1495
- Statue of the Virgin, Franciscan Church, Salzburg
- Betrothal of the Virgin and the Flagellation of Christ, Österreichische Galerie Belvedere, Vienna
- Joseph Lowered into the Well, Österreichische Galerie Belvedere, Vienna
- Head of Saint Anne, Private Collection, Vienna
- The Devil Presenting St. Augustine with the Book of Vices Wills, Garry; Fox, Robin Lane (2016-03-10). "A Difference Over Augustine". The New York Review of Books. 63 (4).

== Gallery ==
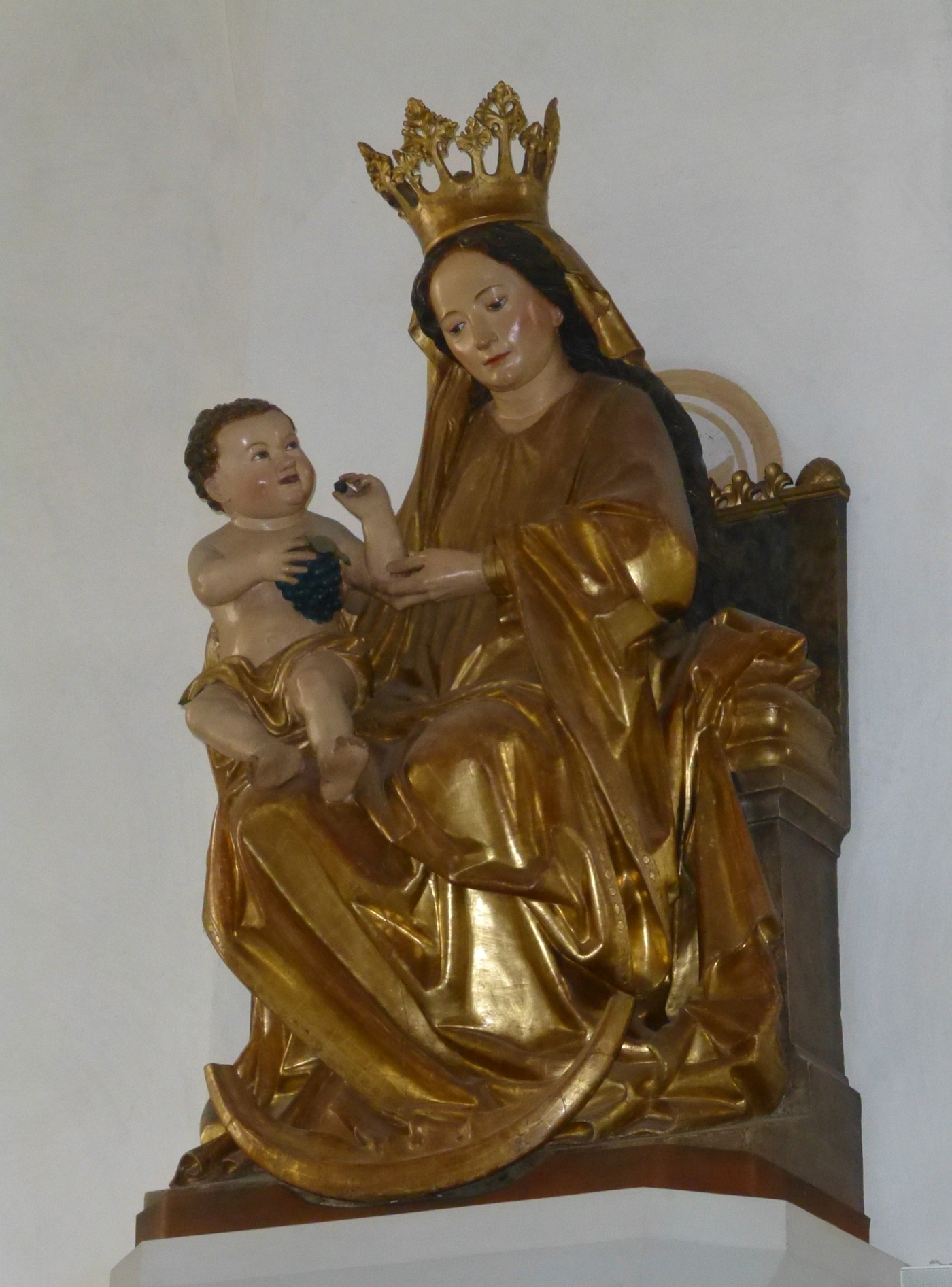
Statue of the Virgin, Parish Church, St. Lorenzo in Pusteria, c. 1465

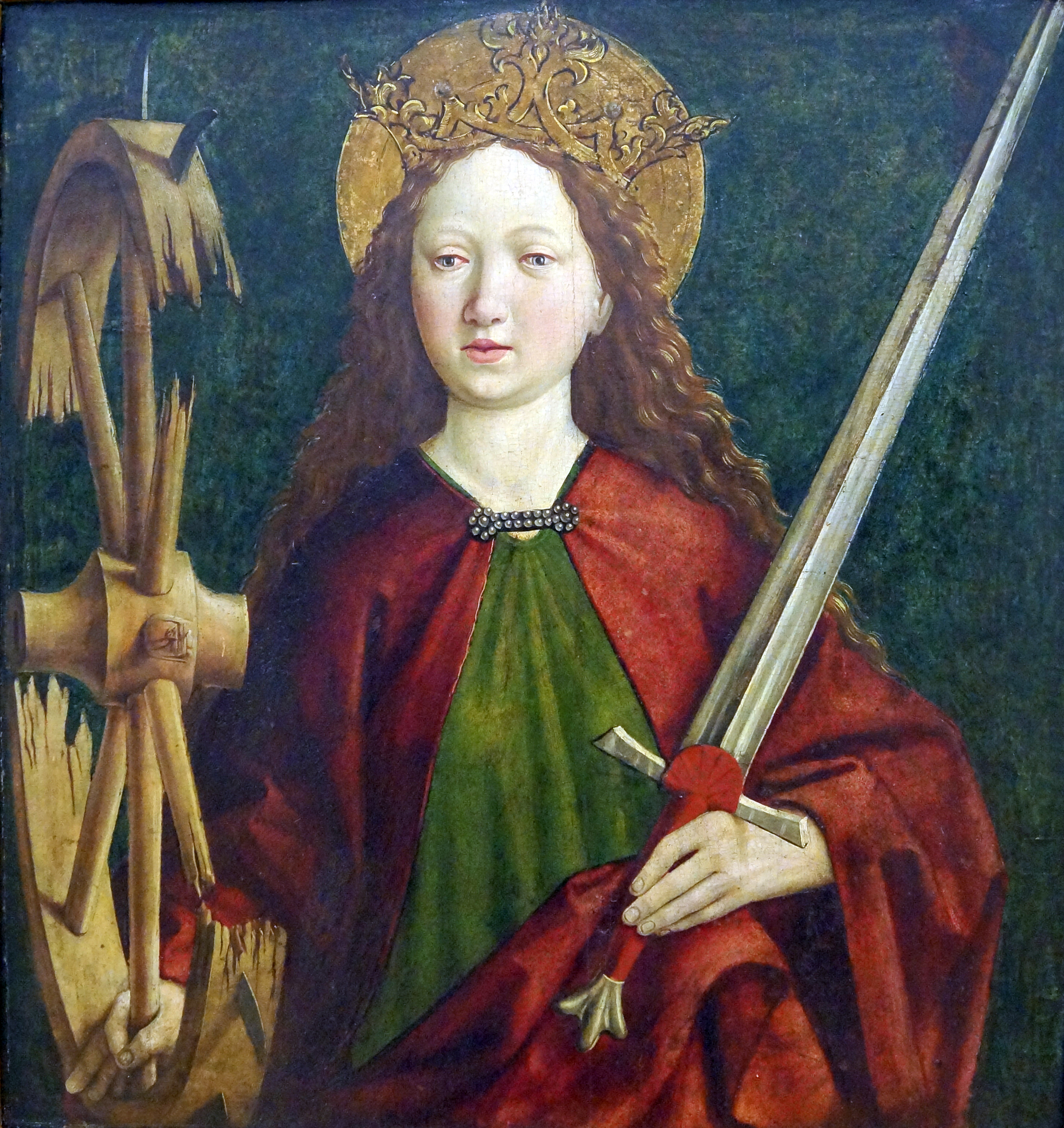
Saint Katharina, 1465

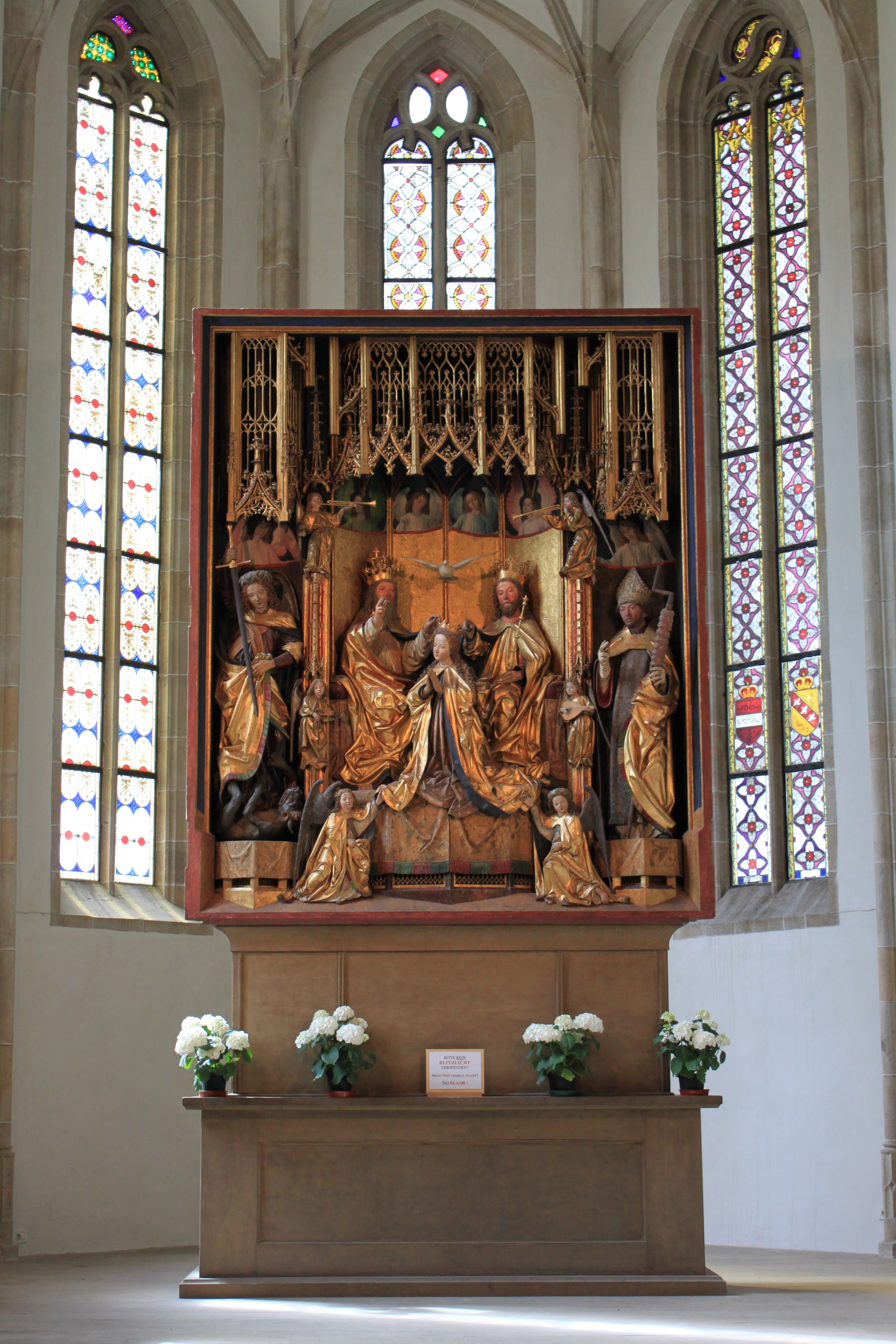
Altar of the Coronation of the Virgin, Gries, Italy, 1475

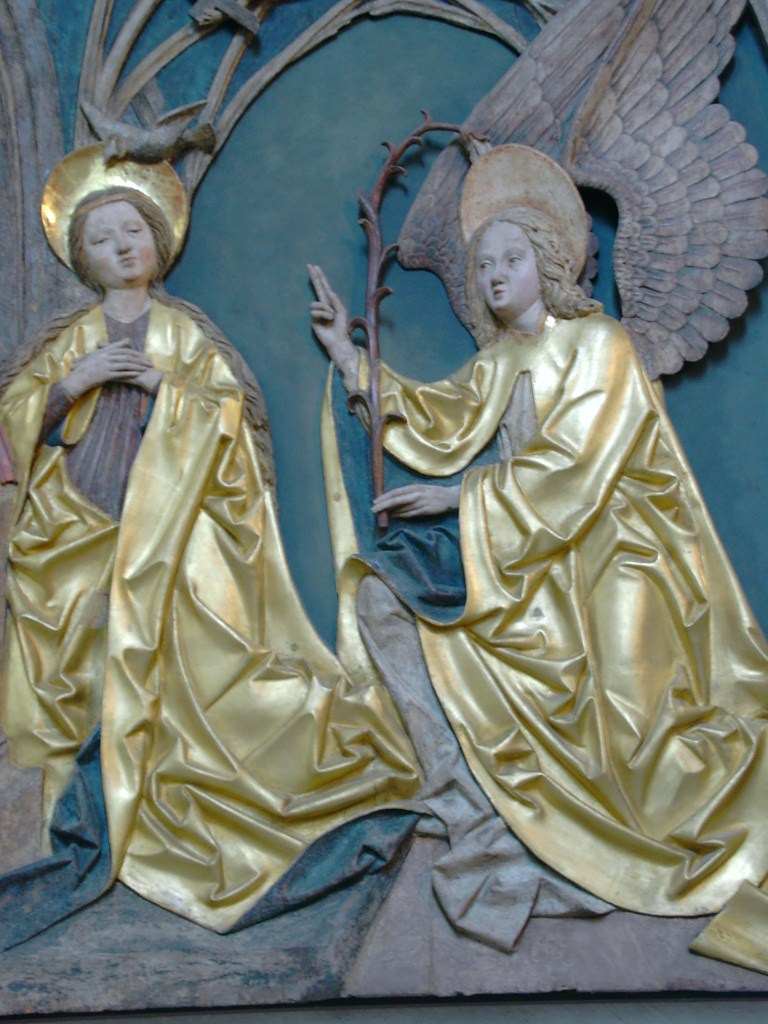
Altar of the Coronation of the Virgin (detail), Gries, Italy, 1475

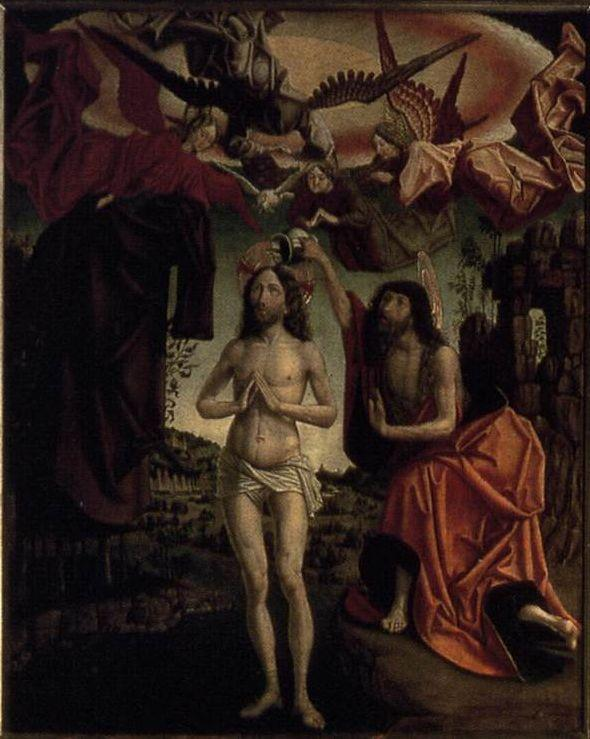
St. Wolfgang Altarpiece, Baptism of Christ, 1479–81

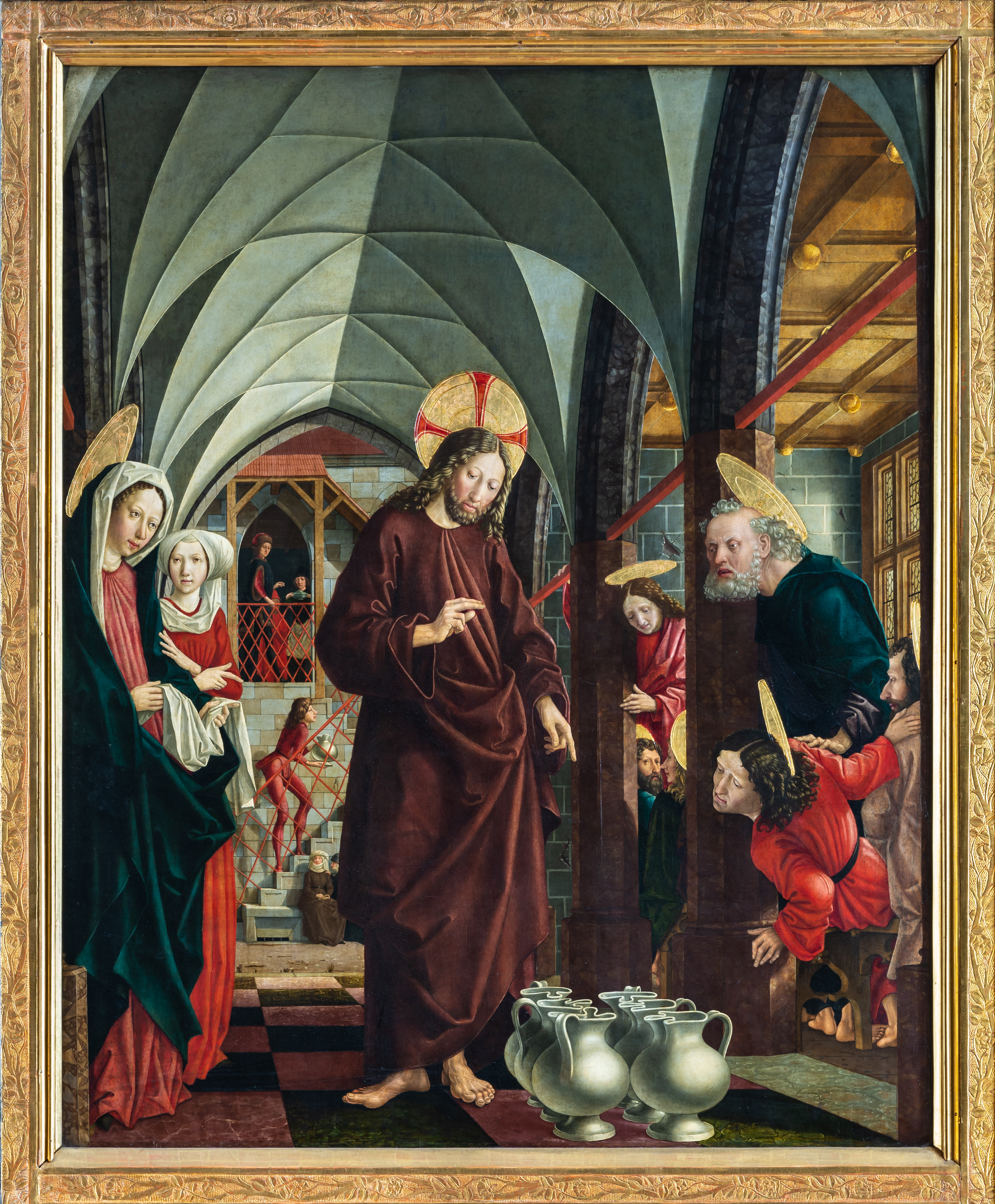
St. Wolfgang Altarpiece, Marriage at Cana, 1479–81

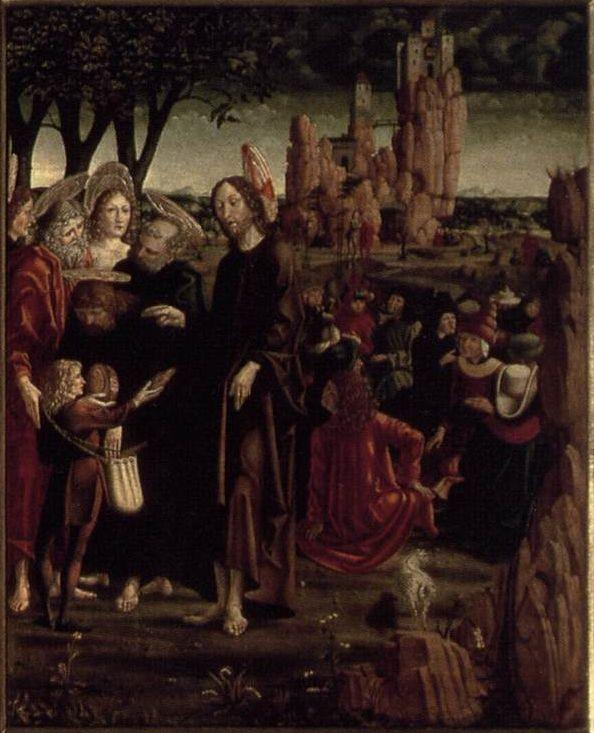
St. Wolfgang Altarpiece, Miracle of the Bread, 1479–81

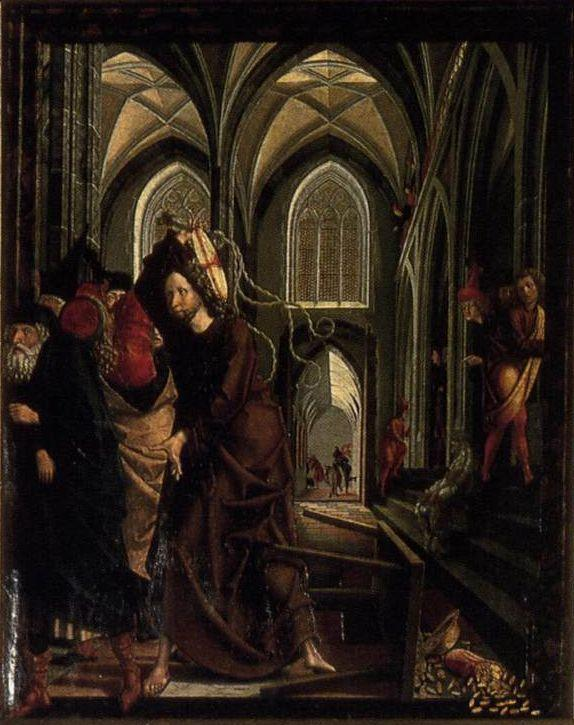
St. Wolfgang Altarpiece, Purification of the Temple, 1479–81

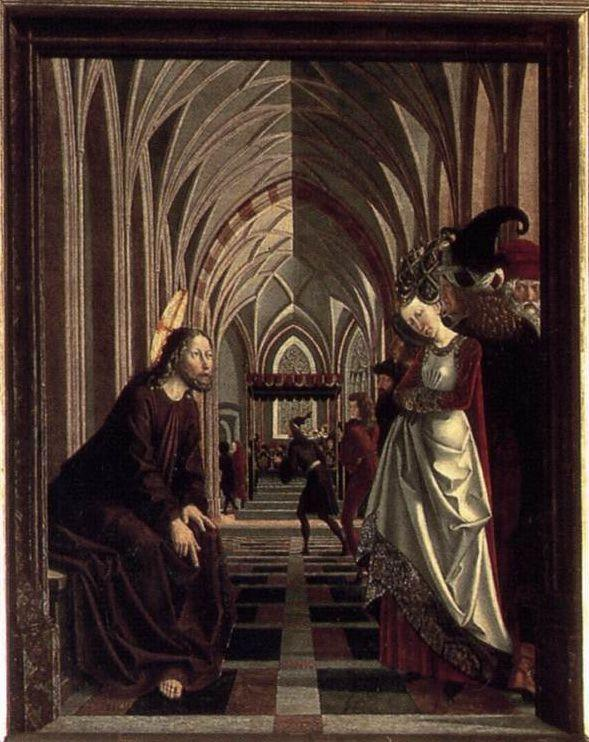
St. Wolfgang Altarpiece, Christ and the Adulteress, 1479–81

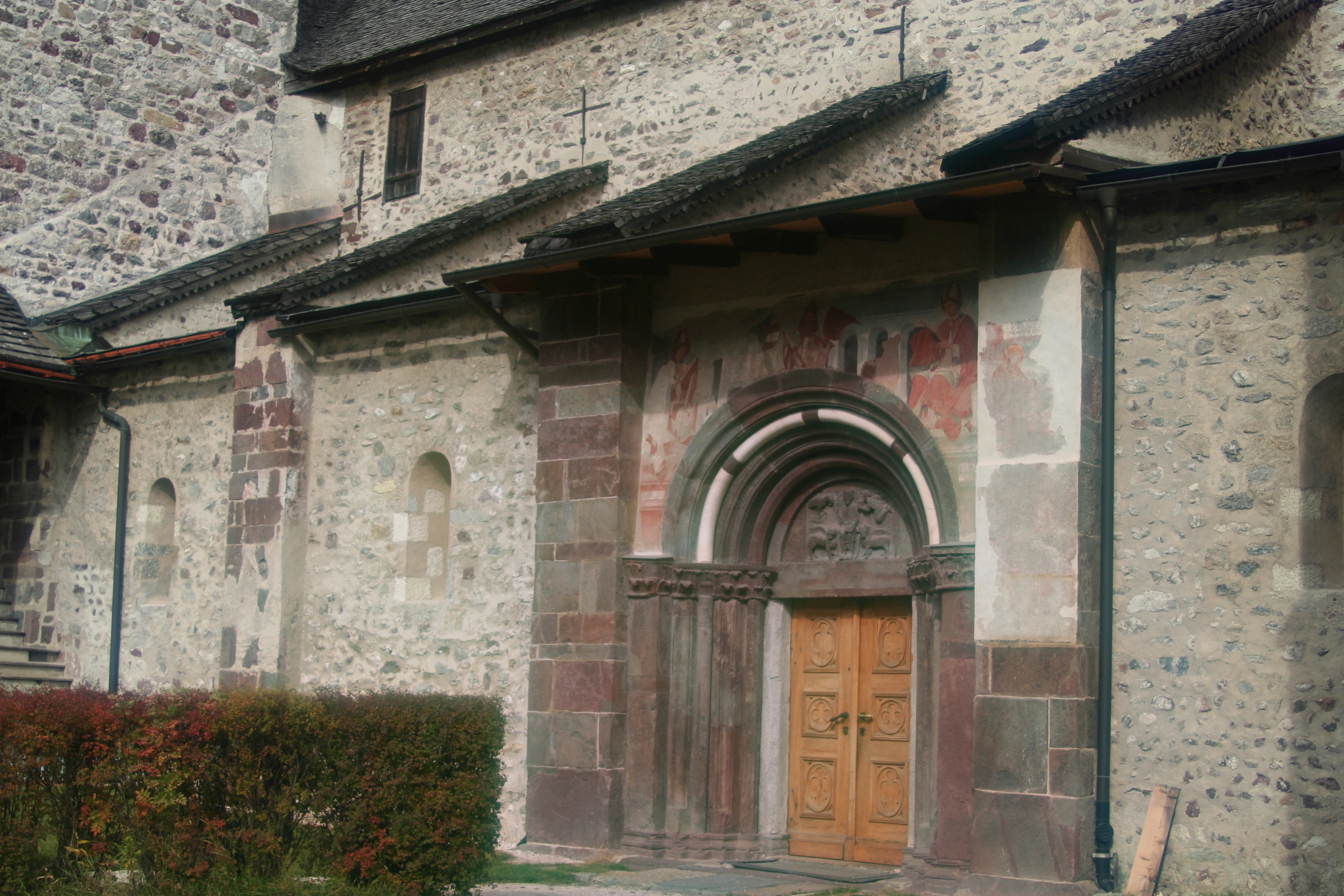
Collegiate Church, San Candido, Italy, c. 1480

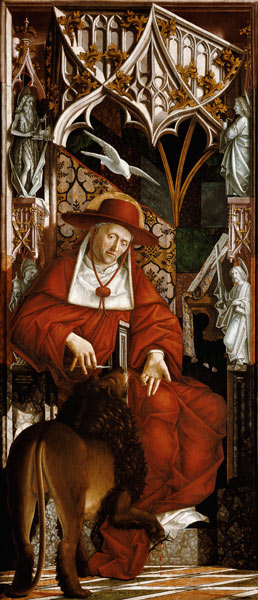
Altarpiece of the Church Fathers left panel showing Saint Jerome, 1480–83

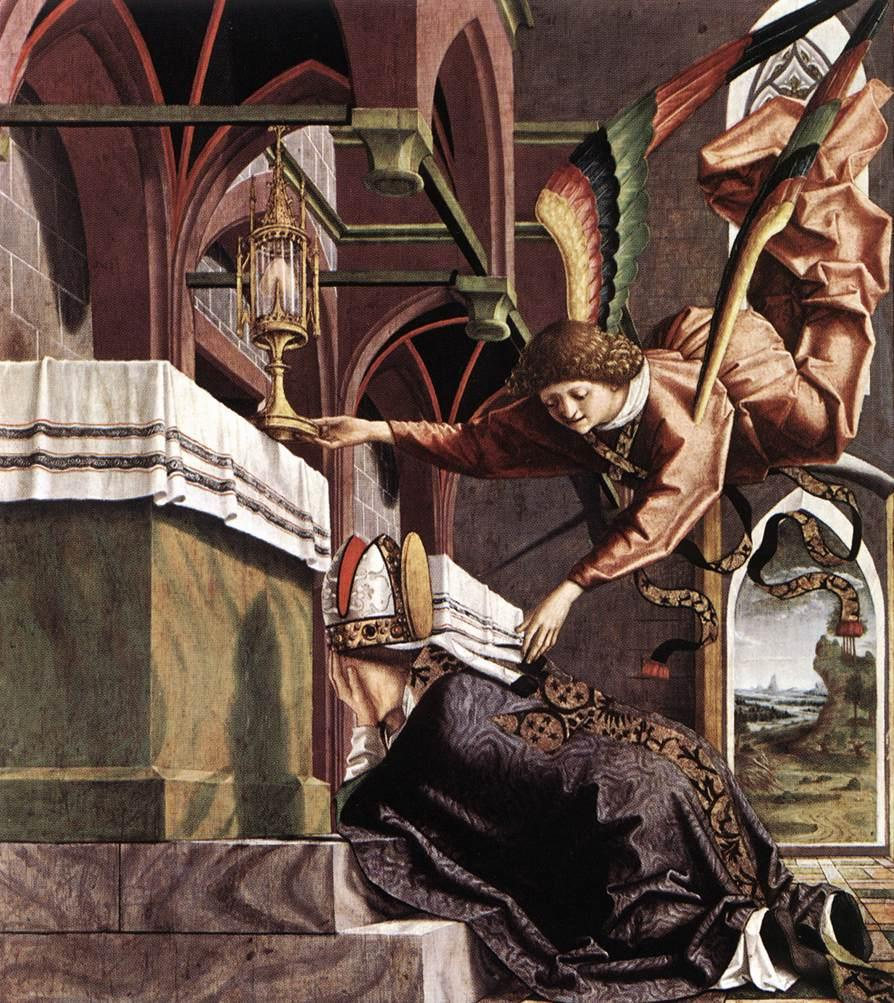
Altarpiece of the Church Fathers front panel, Vision of Saint Sigisbert, 1480–83

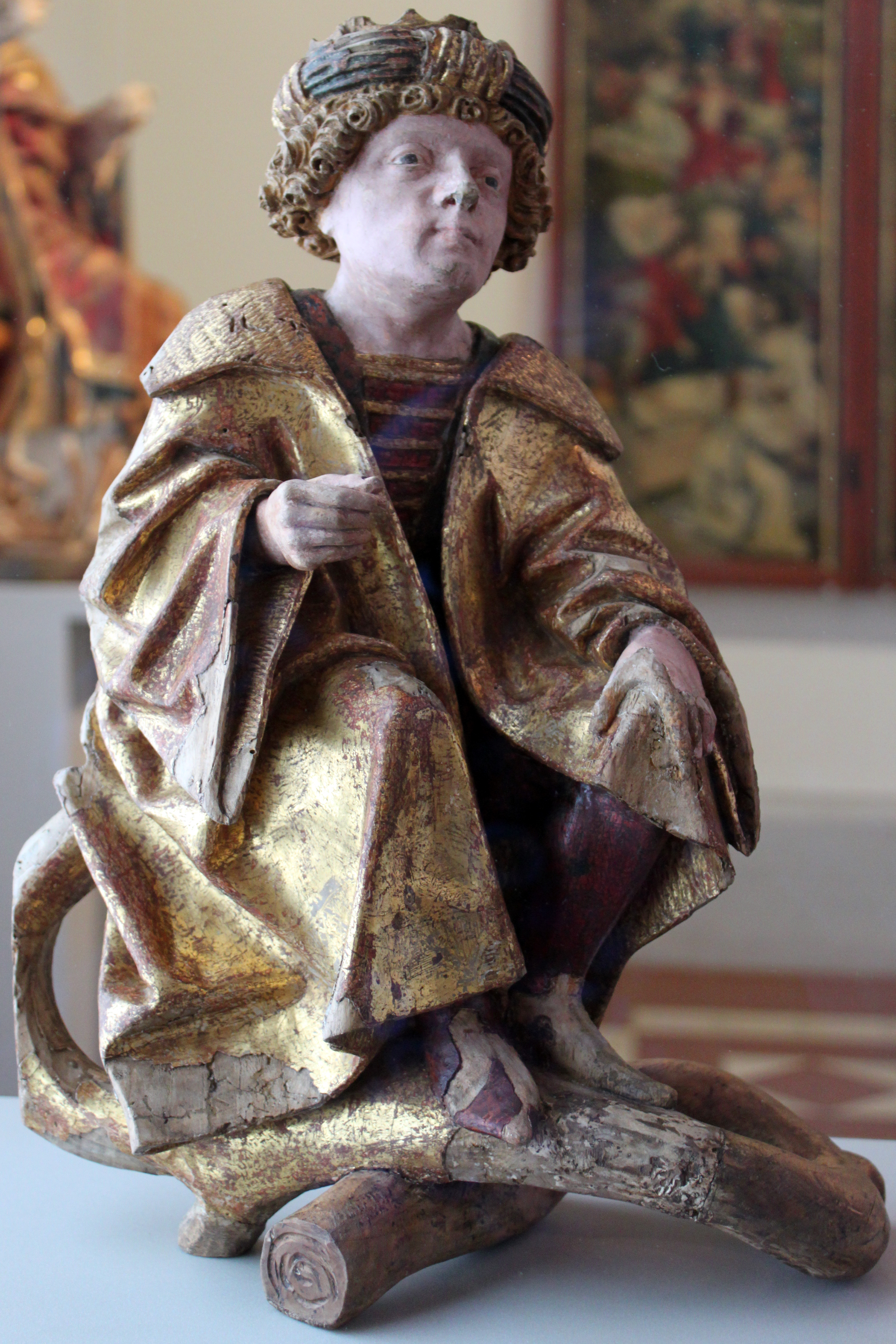
King of the Root of Jesse, 1485

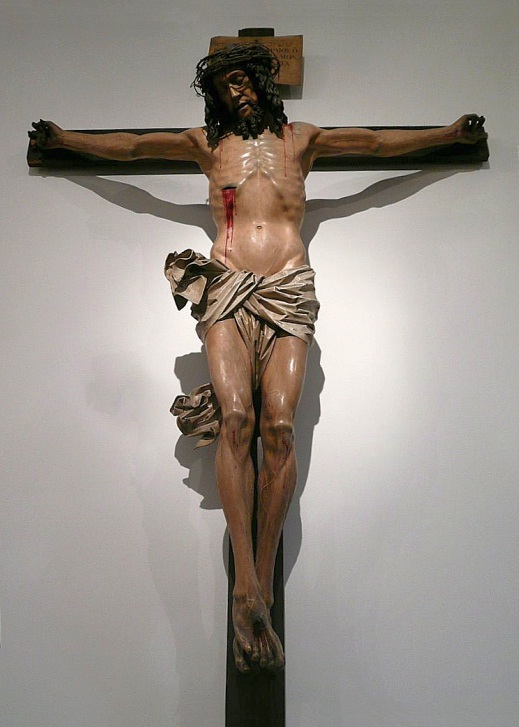
Crucifix, c. 1490

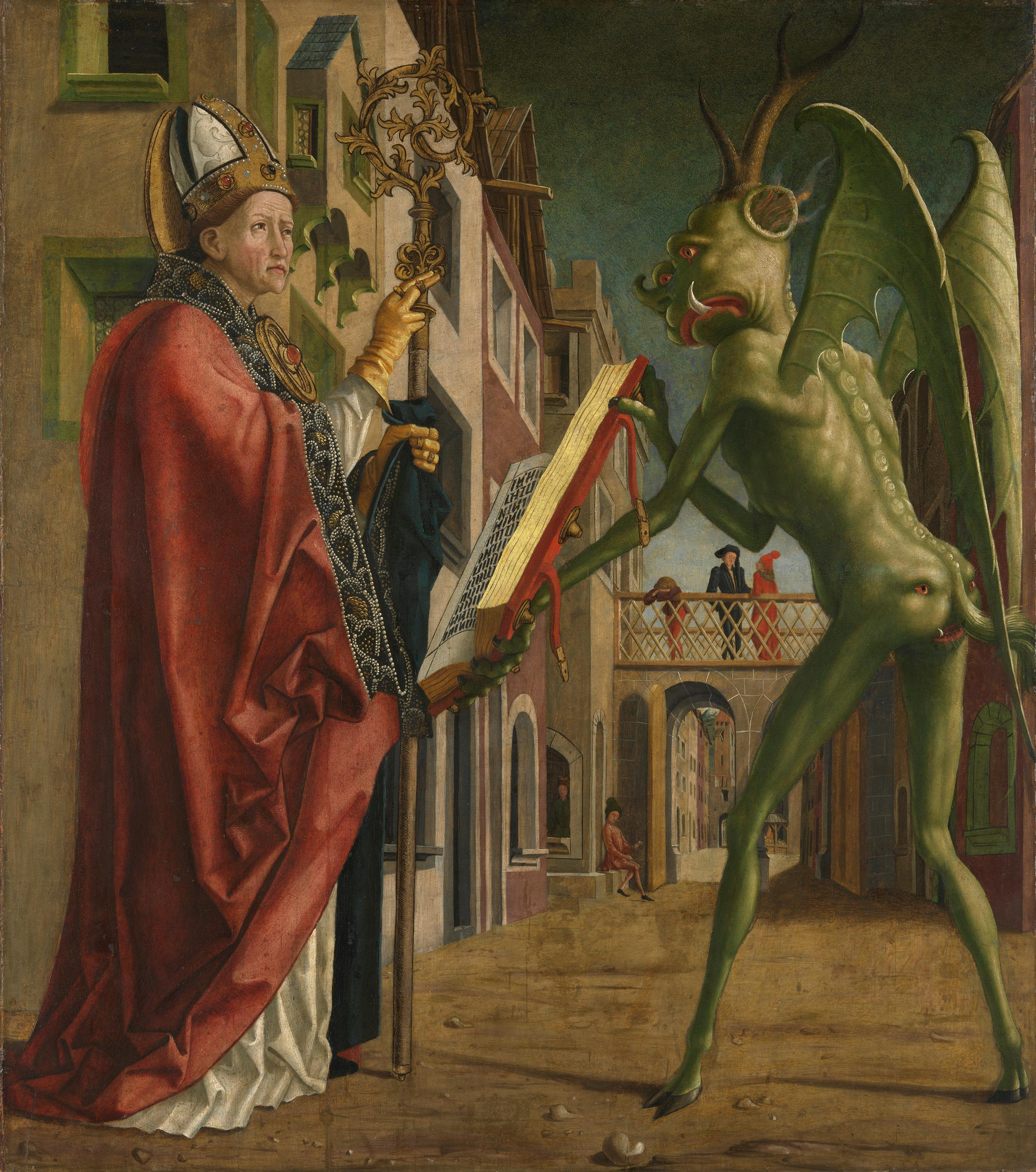
Saint Augustine and the devil, c. 1471
