= Albert T. Clay =

American historian

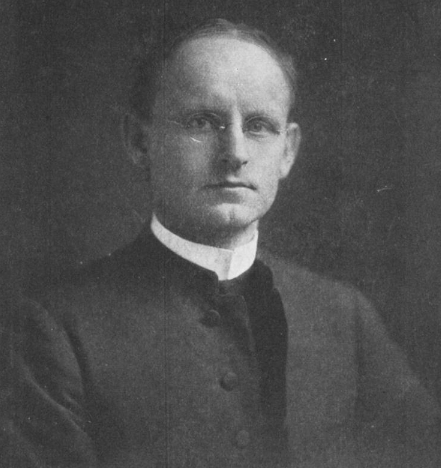
Albert T. Clay

Albert Tobias Clay (December 4, 1866 – September 14, 1925) was an American professor, historian and Semitic linguist. He was professor of Assyriology and Babylonian Literature at Yale University and served as founding curator of the Yale Babylonian Collection.

== Background ==
Albert Tobias Clay was born at Hanover in York County, Pennsylvania. He graduated from Franklin and Marshall College in Lancaster, Pennsylvania during 1889 and from the Lutheran Theological Seminary at Gettysburg in 1892. He was subsequently ordained into the Lutheran ministry.

== Career ==
Clay went on to become a teaching fellow in Assyrian and instructor in the Hebrew language at the University of Pennsylvania. In 1895–99, he returned as lecturer in Semitic archaeology after being an instructor in Old Testament theology at the Chicago Lutheran Seminary. He was assistant professor of Semitic philology and archaeology 1903–09 and full professor for one year.

In 1910, Clay became the William M. Laffan Professor of Assyriology and Babylonian Literature at Yale University. In 1909, J. Pierpont Morgan funded the founding of the Yale Babylonian Collection at Yale University. Clay served as its first curator, a position which he held until his death in 1925. His assistant Ettalene M. Grice succeeded him as acting curator from 1925 to 1926.

Clay was elected to the American Philosophical Society in 1912. He served as Librarian of the American Oriental Society from 1913 to 1924 and as its president in 1924–25. He first visited Iraq in 1920, and returned in 1923 as the Commissioner for the American Schools of Oriental Research (ASOR) to formally open the Society school in Baghdad. He remained as its first annual Visiting Professor and deputy director (1923–24).

== Selected works ==
His most important publications were Babylonian business and legal documents, especially Business Documents of Murashû Sons of Nippur (1898; et seq). Amurru, the Home of the Northern Semites (1909) shows the non-Babylonian origin of Israelite culture and religion. Other notable works included Light on the Old Testament from Babel (1907), The Empire of the Amorites (1919), An Old Babylonian Version of the Gilgamesh Epic (1920), A Hebrew Deluge Story in Cuneiform (1922) and The Origin of Biblical Traditions (1923). In his works, he argues against the panbabylonism Bible-Babel school: instead, he argues the Babylonian legends display evidence of Amorite influence.

== Personal life ==
Albert T. Clay was married to Elizabeth Somerville McCafferty (1867–1936). They were the parents of Albert born in 1898 and Barbara born in 1905.
