= Raphael Ravenscroft =

British musician, composer, and author (1954–2014)

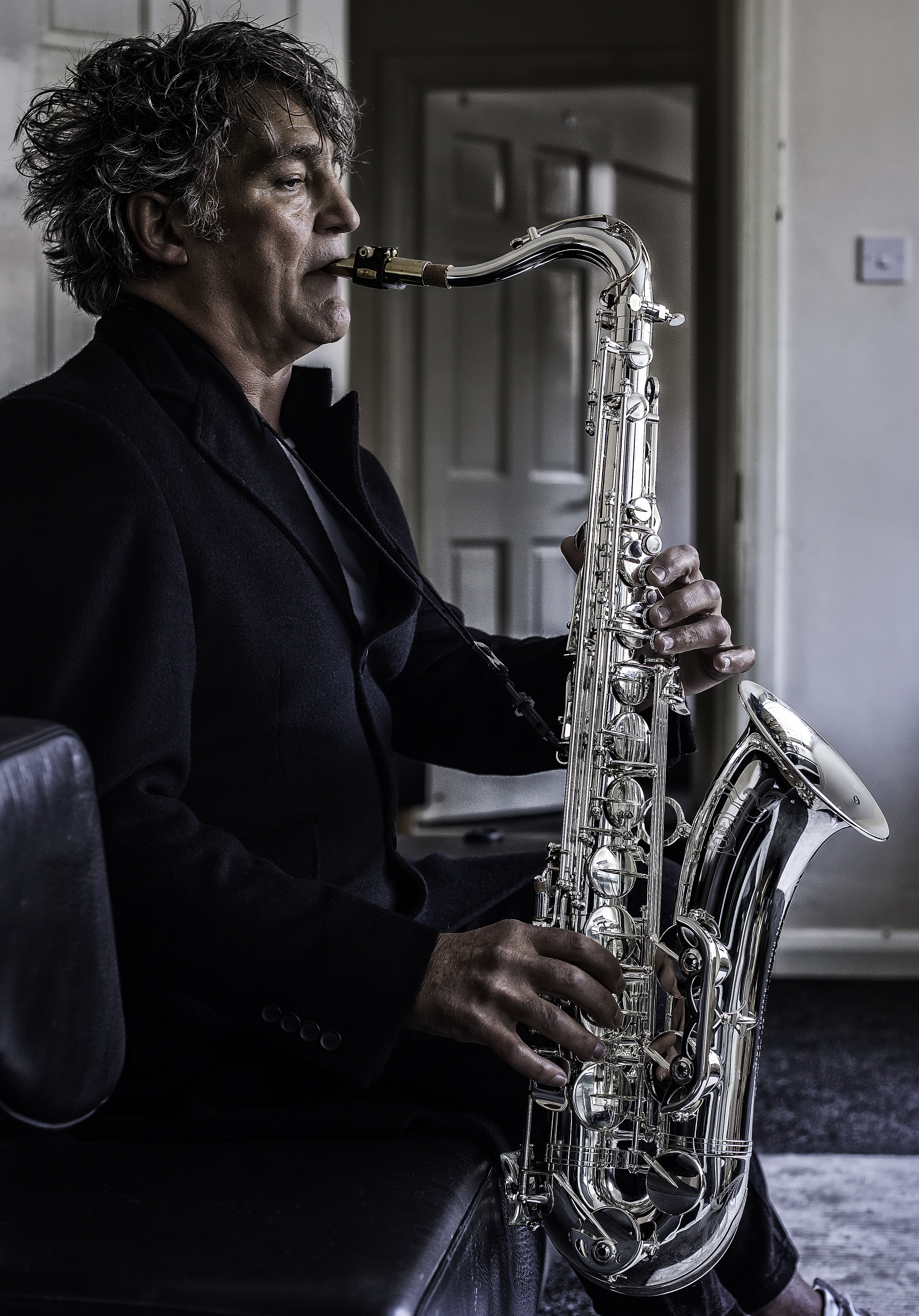
- Ravenscroft in 2014

Background information
- Born: 4 June 1954; Stoke-on-Trent, Staffordshire, England
- Died: 19 October 2014 (aged 60) Exeter, Devon, England
- Genres: Rock; jazz
- Occupations: Musician; composer; author
- Instrument: Saxophone

Raphael Ravenscroft (4 June 1954 – 19 October 2014) was a British musician, composer and author. He is best known for playing the saxophone riff on Gerry Rafferty's 1978 song "Baker Street".

== Early life ==
Ravenscroft was born in the district of Stoke-on-Trent, Staffordshire, the eldest son of Trevor Ravenscroft, author of the occult book The Spear of Destiny (1972). He spent much of his childhood in Dumfries, Scotland, where his father lived.

== Career ==
=== Gerry Rafferty and "Baker Street" ===
In January 1978, Scottish singer-musician Gerry Rafferty was recording his first solo material since 1972, and his first material of any kind since the demise of Stealers Wheel in 1975, at Chipping Norton Studios in Oxfordshire. As a then-unknown session musician, Ravenscroft was booked to play saxophone on two tracks on the album, City to City (1978). His contribution included the sax riff on the best-known song from the album and of Rafferty's career, "Baker Street". The song became an international hit, charting at number 3 in the UK and number 2 in the US, and in 2010 was reported to have received 5 million air plays worldwide. City to City reached number 1 in the US album charts and went platinum. In the UK the album reached number 6 and went gold.

The saxophone break on "Baker Street" has been described as "the most famous saxophone solo of all time" and "the most recognizable sax riff in pop music history". The distinctive wailing, bluesy sound of the sax riff was a result of the alto saxophone Ravenscroft was using being tuned slightly flat, and in a radio interview in 2011, he said that listening to his performance on the song annoyed him. "I'm irritated because it's out of tune. It's flat, by enough of a degree that it irritates me at best." Ravenscroft's contribution to "Baker Street" is said to have been responsible for a resurgence in the sales of saxophones and their use in mainstream pop music and television advertising.

Ravenscroft stated that the decision to use the riff, which he said was based on "an old blues riff", was his, but earlier demo recordings for "Baker Street" contain a similar riff played by Rafferty on guitar and recorded before Ravenscroft became involved. An almost identical riff had been played ten years before on the 1968 Steve Marcus jazz track "Half a Heart", and it has been suggested that Ravenscroft's performance on "Baker Street" may have been influenced by it.

Ravenscroft mostly refused to play "Baker Street" during interviews, and the last time he played "Baker Street" was in the summer of 2014, when he organised a charity gala concert in Exeter, where he was living, for a city schoolgirl who had died in a fall. In 2010 he told the BBC's The One Show that he was paid only £27.50 for the "Baker Street" session, the Musicians' Union freelance rate at the time. It has been incorrectly reported that the cheque bounced, and that it was hung on the wall of Ravenscroft's solicitors. The song is said to have earned Rafferty £80,000 a year in royalties.

Ravenscroft worked with Rafferty from 1977 to 1982. As well as the songs he worked on for City to City, he contributed to Rafferty's next two albums, Night Owl (1979) on which he played the lyricon on the title track of the album, and follow-up album Snakes and Ladders (1980). In 2011, he recorded a tribute to commemorate the funeral of Gerry Rafferty called "Forgiveness" with friend/producer Grice Peters at Sound Gallery studios, which combined his saxophone playing with the voices of Grammy-nominated choir Tenebrae.

=== Other work ===
From his breakthrough with "Baker Street" he went on to perform with Pink Floyd (The Final Cut, 1983), ABBA and Marvin Gaye. Other Ravenscroft performing credits include work with America, Maxine Nightingale, Daft Punk, Kim Carnes, The Only Ones, Mike Oldfield, Chris Rea, Robert Plant, Brand X, Hazel O'Connor and Bonnie Tyler. In 1979, he released the solo album Her Father Didn't Like Me, Anyway (CBS Portrait JR 35683). On September 19, 1982 Ravenscroft released the album Lifeline of which in 1983 from that album he released the track "Maxine" which gained airplay, but performed poorly on the charts. There were also two versions of that song released with different vocal and instrumental arrangements and one has an extra verse. In 1987, he was credited, along with Max Early and Johnny Patrick for the new theme to the Central Television soap opera Crossroads.

In 2010, Ravenscroft played on albums and on sessions with Duffy, Mary Hopkin and Jamie Hartman. In 2011–12, Ravenscroft contributed to the album Propeller by Grice Peters (GRICE).

Ravenscroft wrote several books on saxophone technique, including The Complete Saxophone Player (1990).

In 2012, Ravenscroft created the music for a series of films featuring photographer Don McCullin, and during 2011–2012 composed for several major advertising campaigns around the world. In summer 2012, he took a break due to ill-health, and moved back to Devon.

In 2014, Ravenscroft went to Belgium to help to set up a saxophone project Wie is Sax4Pax? with the company Adolphe Sax & Cie, who were also planning to produce a "Ravenscroft Edition".

== Personal life and death ==
He married and divorced twice, and separated from his third wife in 2009. His daughter is the artist Scarlett Raven. Ravenscroft died on 19 October 2014 at the Royal Devon and Exeter Hospital, aged 60, of a suspected heart attack.

== Collaborations ==
- City to City - Gerry Rafferty (1978)
- Night Owl - Gerry Rafferty (1979)
- Romance Dance - Kim Carnes (1980)
- Snakes and Ladders - Gerry Rafferty (1980)
- In Our Lifetime - Marvin Gaye (1981)
- Pictures at Eleven - Robert Plant (1982)
- The Final Cut - Pink Floyd (1983)
- Your Move - America (1983)
- The Pros and Cons of Hitch Hiking - Roger Waters (1984)
