= Scarlett Raven =

English painter (born 1986)

- Born: 1986 (age 39–40); London, United Kingdom
- Education: Central Saint Martins
- Known for: Painter
- Style: Abstract impressionism and impasto
- Movement: Impressionism
- Parent(s): Raphael Ravenscroft (father); SC Cunningham (mother)
- Website: http://www.scarlettraven.com/

Scarlett Raven (born 1986) is an English painter who is known for painting impressionist paintings using augmented reality.

== Career ==
Raven's artistic approach uses both digital and tangible art. The layers beneath the paintings are accessed using the augmented reality technology supported by the Blippar app. Raven's works have been purchased by people including Orlando Bloom, Mark Owen, and Jim Beach.

== Exhibitions ==
In July 2017, Raven launched The Danger Tree exhibit in Liverpool, England. The exhibition featured oil on canvas paintings with augmented reality layers. Her work was also exhibited in Queen Themed, an exhibition in celebration of Queen Elizabeth's 90th birthday at Art Below in the summer of 2016.

The mental health charity MIND has helped Raven when she has anxiety. She created and donated an oil and mixed-media AR painting called "One In Four" for MIND to auction. The layers beneath this work is about her anxiety struggle.

== Personal life ==
Raven's father is saxophonist Raphael Ravenscroft, best known for performing alongside Gerry Rafferty on the song Baker Street. Her mother is the crime writer SC Cunningham.
