= National Register of Historic Places listings in Johnson County, Georgia =

This is a list of properties and districts in Johnson County, Georgia that are listed on the National Register of Historic Places (NRHP).

This National Park Service list is complete through NPS recent listings posted March 21, 2025.

== Current listings ==
	Name on the Register	Image	Date listed	Location	City or town	Description
1	Grice Inn	Grice Inn	July 20, 1978 (#78000993)	E. Elm St. 32°43′47″N 82°42′59″W	Wrightsville	
2	Johnson County Courthouse	Johnson County Courthouse	September 18, 1980 (#80001101)	Courthouse Sq. 32°43′48″N 82°43′09″W	Wrightsville	
