= Bernhard von Wüllerstorf-Urbair =

Austrian Imperial Minister of Trade (1957–1959)

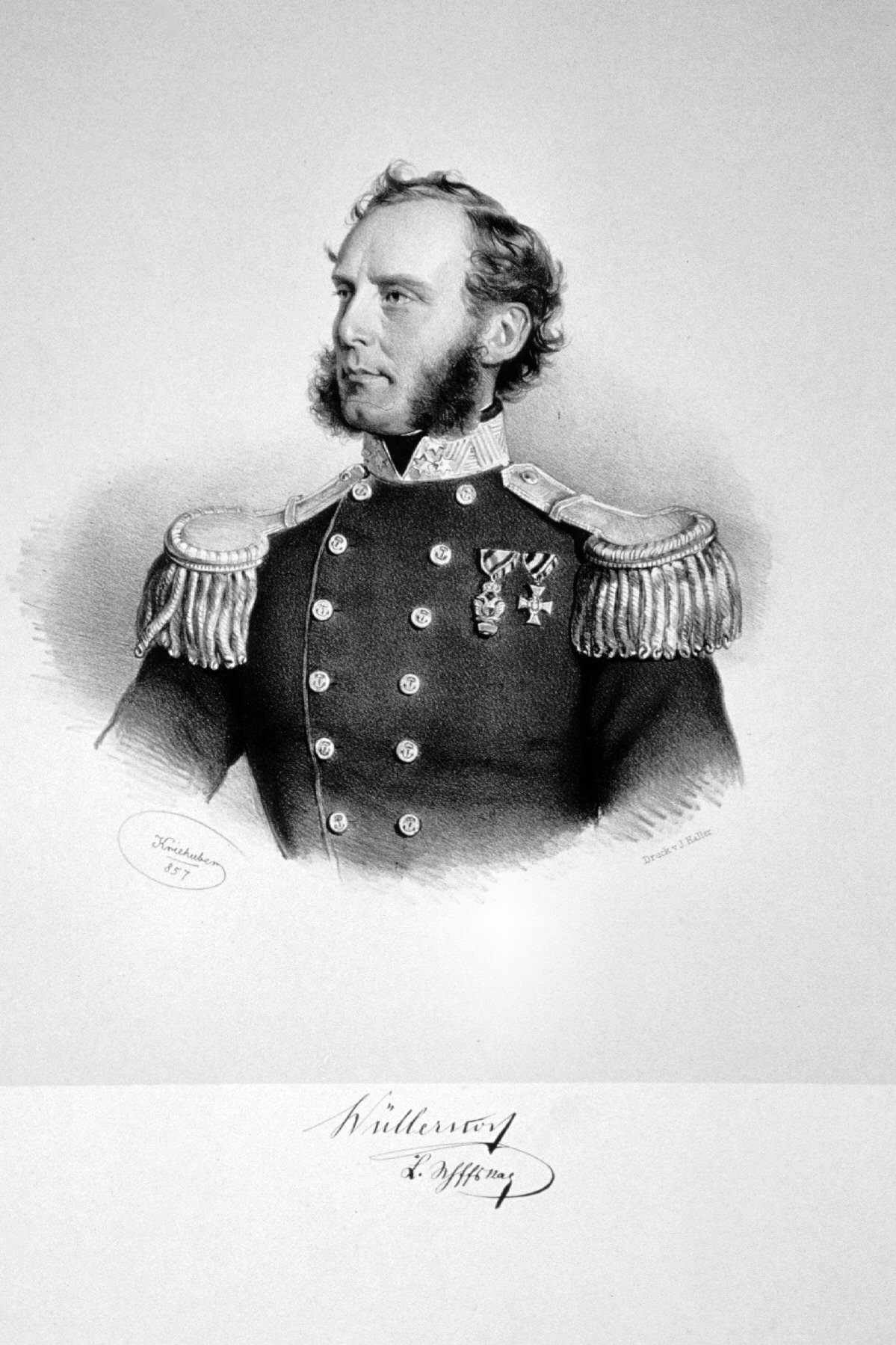
Bernhard von Wüllerstorf-Urbair

Bernhard Freiherr von Wüllerstorf-Urbair, also: von Wüllersdorf-Urbair or von Wüllerstorf und Urbair, (29 January 1816 – 10 August 1883) was an Austrian vice admiral and, from 1865 to 1867, (k.k.) Austrian Imperial Minister of Trade. He was captain of the frigate SMS Novara, including during the world voyage (Novara-Expedition) in 1857-1859.

== Life ==
He was born on 29 January 1816 in Triest (Küstenland, today in Italy).

After attending the grammar schools (Gymnasium) in Padua and in Ofen, in 1828 he joined the pioneer-cadet school in Tulln. As a cadet of the 40th Infantry Regiment, he accepted the 1833 invitation to move to the Austrian Imperial War Navy. Immediately commanding a ship, he had to acquire his further education largely through self-study. Line ship transported in 1839, he seized the opportunity to be assigned to the observatory in Vienna, where he was taught by astronomers Littrow and Schaub. After the end of these studies, he was entrusted with the management of the Naval Observatory in Venice and taught astronomy and nautical science at the Imperial and Royal Naval Academy.

Through his elegant appearance and his winning nature, he also quickly connected to the Venetian society. Immediately after his marriage to Anna O'Connor of Connaught on 12 April 1848, Venice broke from the revolution. He fled the city with his young wife and, in the course of the escape, her death took place. He traveled immediately to Trieste, where Field Marshal Lieutenant Gyulay had gathered the true-believer remnants of the Navy.

He was an important employee of the reorganization concerned with the Vice-Admiral Dahlerup. In 1849, he became Lieutenant. The next few years passed, in alternating between staff work and ship commands. In 1855, he was adviser to the new navy commander Archduke Ferdinand Max. Soon he was able to advance his enthusiastic lord's plan for a voyage around the world: he assisted with its planning in 1856. As line-captain and Commodore of the frigate Novara, already at the time, he commanded the expedition, which lasted from 30 April 1857 to 26 August 1859. Numerous research findings, rich collections for the Vienna museums, and high reputation for the Imperial Navy were the main results of the voyage around the world. Due to his scientific knowledge, he assisted all oceanographic, hydrographic and meteorological observations.

For his scientific achievements, he was added in 1863 as an honorary member of the Bavarian Academy of Sciences. His 3-volume report was published, in 1861, as "Journey of the Austrian Frigate Novara around the Earth in 1857, 1858, 1859 under the command of Commodore B. von Wüllersdorf-Urbair".

After a deployment in the waters around which the free throngs of Garibaldi threatened Sicily, he became Rear Admiral and representative of the navy commander at Reichsrat in Vienna. In 1864, he led the German-Danish War, a squadron into the North Sea according to where Wilhelm von Tegetthoff, even before his arrival, the Battle of Heligoland (1864) had beaten. This suspended a little justified criticism of him.

In autumn 1865, he was asked by Prime Minister Count Richard Belcredi to head the Department of Commerce. As Minister in a politically controversial government (in the contemporary press also as a "Three Count Ministry", referring to him as next to Prime Minister Count Belcredi still the Counts Larisch-Mönich and Mensdorff-Pouilly), he tried concluding trade treaties, plus dealt with the communications and postal services. He also led a program designed to supplement the rail network, which largely came to be implemented (see Memorandum 1866, "A railway network for the Austrian monarchy"). Under his leadership office, the expansion of the port of Trieste was also addressed. The Austro-Hungarian Compromise of 1867 led him to resign.

Bernhard von Wüllerstorf-Urbair died in Bolzano, which was then part of the old county of Tyrol. He is buried in the cemetery of the Old Parish Church of Gries in the Gries-San Quirino district.

== Works ==
The following are selected works by Bernhard von Wüllerstorf-Urbair:

- Bernhard von Wüllersdorf-Urbair, Reise der österr. Fregatte Novara um die Erde in den Jahren 1857, 1858, 1859 unter den Befehlen des Commodore Bernhard von Wüllersdorf-Urbair, Vienna, 1861.
- Bernhard von Wüllerstorf-Urbair / Robert Müller, Beobachtungen des Cometen Donati am Bord der k.k. österreichischen Fregatte "Novara" vom Commodore Bernhard v. Wüllerstorf und dem Fregatten-Lieutenant Robert Müller. (Astronomical News), Volume 50, 211 (1859).
- Bernhard von Wüllerstorf-Urbair, "Ein Eisenbahnnetz für die österreichische Monarchie". In: Österreichische Revue (Austrian Review), 1866, p. 22 ff.

== See also ==
- European and American voyages of scientific exploration
