= Griese =

Griese may refer to:

- Bob Griese (born 1945), American football quarterback
- Brian Griese (born 1975), American football quarterback
- Friedrich Griese (1890–1975), German novelist
- Kerstin Griese (born 1966), German politician
- River Griese, a river in County Kildare, Ireland
