= Grice–Fearing House =

Historic house in North Carolina, United States

Coordinates: 36.2992°N 76.2243°W

- U.S. Historic district – Contributing property
- Location within North Carolina Location within the United States
- Location: 200 South Road Street, Elizabeth City, North Carolina
- Built: 1798
- Part of: Shepard Street-South Road Street Historic District (ID94000164)
- MPS: Elizabeth City MPS

The Grice–Fearing House is the oldest house (ca. 1798) in Elizabeth City, North Carolina, located at 200 South Road Street. It is a contributing property in the Shepard Street–South Road Street Historic District, which is listed on the National Register of Historic Places.

The house was originally built for Francis Grice. After his death, his widow Mary married Isaiah Fearing, thus providing the house with its name.

The house is now operated as a two-suite bed and breakfast.

== See also ==
- Milford (Camden, North Carolina), another historic house of the Grice family, built in 1746, also known as "Relfe-Grice-Sawyer House"
