= Ettalene M. Grice =

American educator

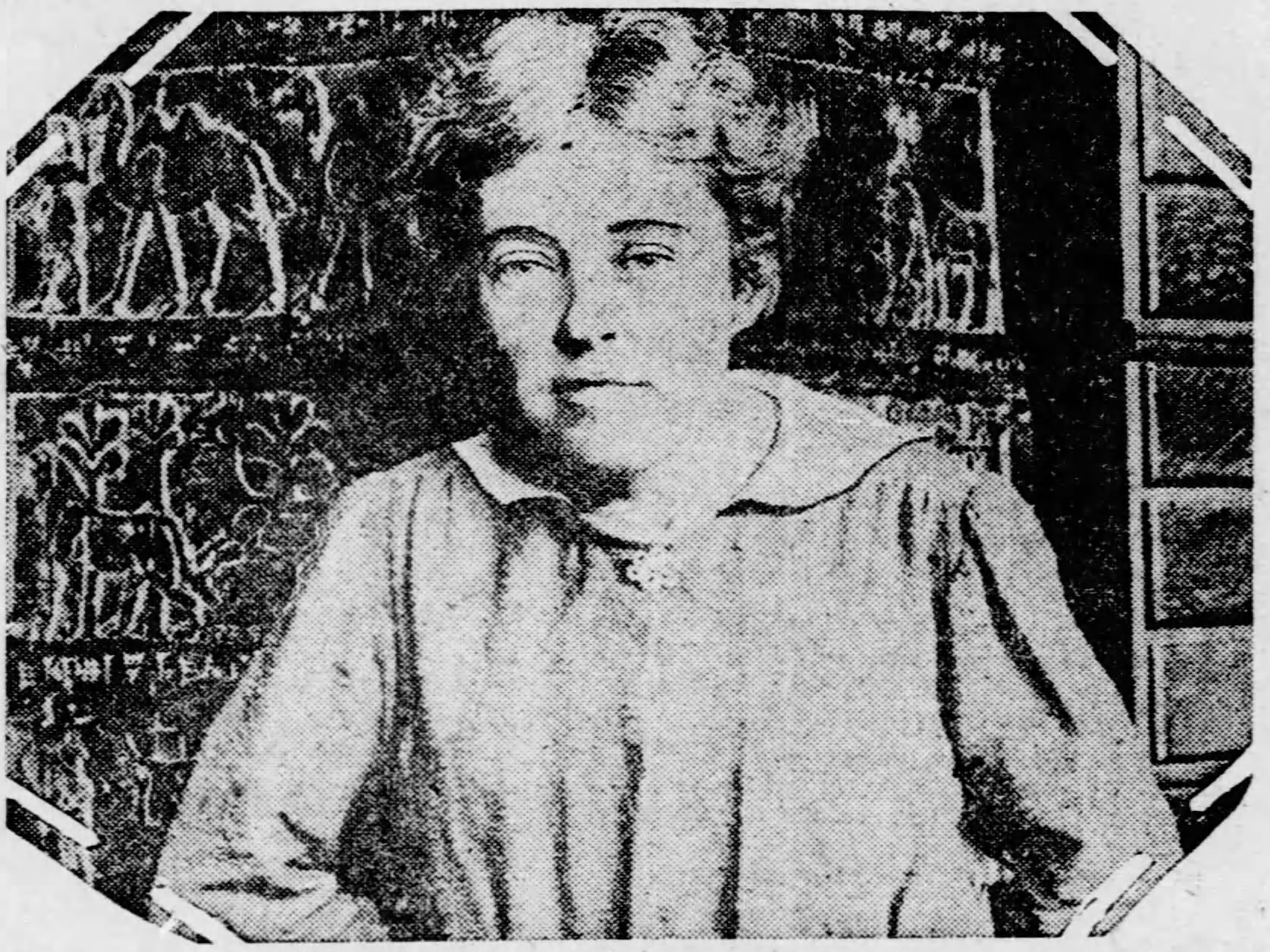
- Grice in 1925
- Born: March 25, 1887; Portsmouth, Ohio, U.S.
- Died: December 4, 1927 (age 40); Hartford, Connecticut, U.S.
- Other names: Ettaline Grice
- Occupations: Educator, curator, scholar

Ettalene Mears Grice (March 25, 1887 – December 4, 1927) was an American educator, curator, and scholar of ancient Assyria and Babylonia. In 1917, she was the first woman to earn a Ph.D. in Assyriology at Yale University, and was acting curator of the Yale Babylonian Collection from 1925 to 1926.

== Early life and education ==
Grice was born in Portsmouth, Ohio, the daughter of William Barrett Grice and Louise J. Tomlinson Grice. Her father was a lawyer. She graduated from Portsmouth High School, and in 1908 from the Western College for Women, and pursued further studies in Biblical literature at Bryn Mawr College from 1912 to 1914. She completed doctoral studies in 1917, and was the first woman to earn a Ph.D. in Assyriology at Yale. Her dissertation was titled "Tablets from Ur and Larsa, Dated in the Larsa Dynasty."

== Career ==
Grice taught school in Ohio from 1908 to 1912. She was the Alexander Kohut Research Fellow at Yale from 1919 to 1925, working as assistant to curator and professor Albert T. Clay, and lecturing on Assyria. She was assistant professor of Assyriology and Babylonian literature. She was acting curator of Yale's Babylonian Collection from 1925 to 1926. As Clay's assistant, she worked on several large projects, including a "Historical Palaeography of Babylonia and Assyria", which was "a dreary, endless task, but Miss Grice embarked upon it with patience and competence," according to a recent historian.

== Publications ==
- Records from Ur and Larsa, Dated in the Larsa Dynasty (1919, her dissertation)
- Chronology of the Larsa Dynasty (1919)
- "In Memoriam Albert T. Clay" (1925)

== Personal life ==
Grice's widowed father lived with her in Connecticut. He moved back to Ohio after she died suddenly in 1927, at the age of 40, in Hartford, Connecticut.
