= Old Parish Church of Gries =

Church in Bolzano, Italy

Coordinates: 46°30′17″N 11°19′57″E

Old Parish Church of Gries

The Old Parish Church of Gries (German: Alte Pfarrkirche Gries; Italian: Vecchia Parrocchiale di Gries; also known as Our Lady's Church) was until 1788 the parish church of the formerly independent municipality of Gries, which today forms part of the Gries-San Quirino district of Bolzano, South Tyrol (Italy). The Late Gothic church contains several precious works of art.

== History ==
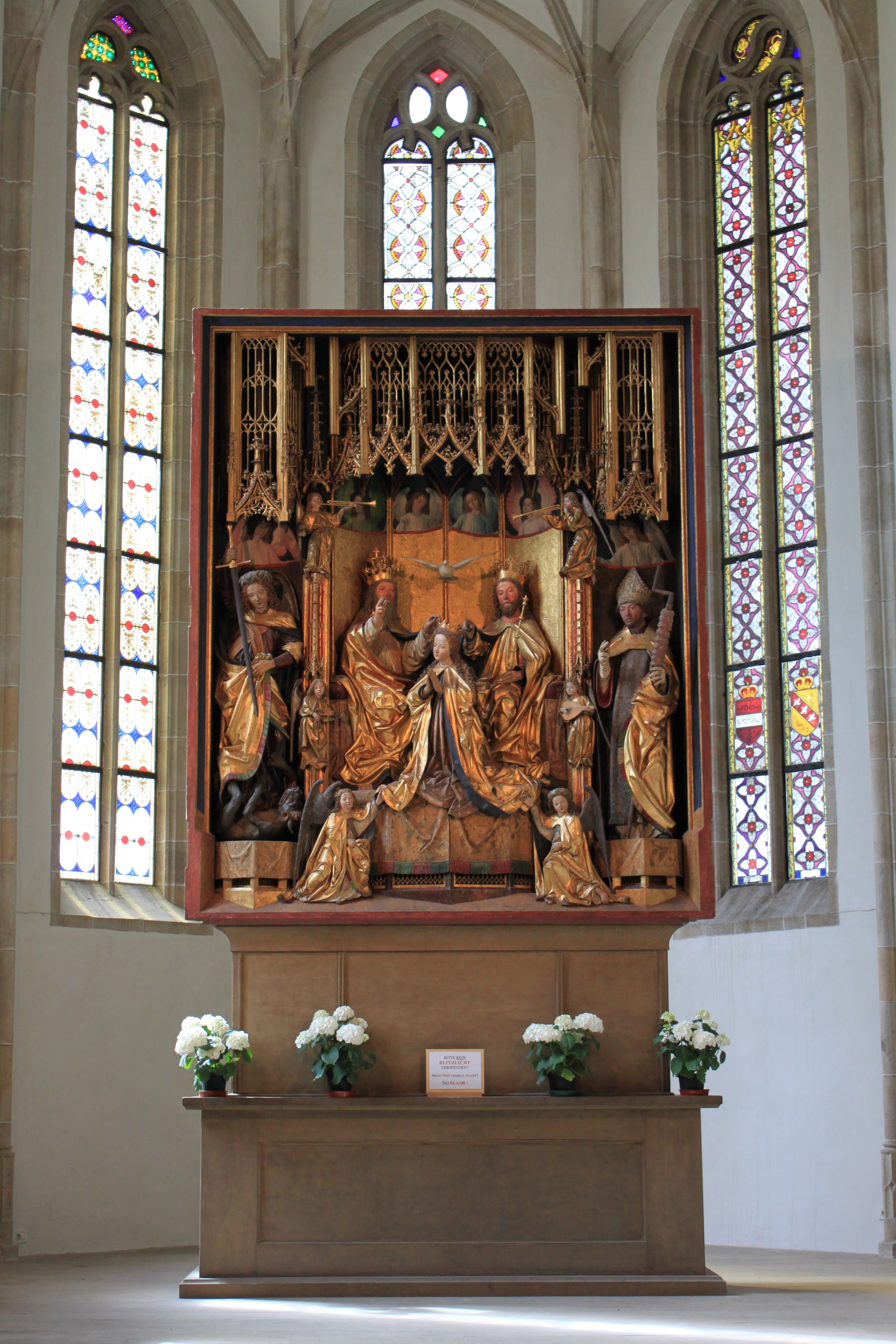
The altarpiece by Michael Pacher

The castle of the Counts of Tyrol originally occupied the location of the present-day Muri-Gries Abbey, while the church serving the area (known as Cheller or Keller from the Early Middle Ages until the 15th century, when Gries started to be used instead) was built somewhat north of the castle. Of this first, Romanesque church on the site, some parts are still preserved as parts of the walls of the tower and nave. There has probably been a settlement in the area since Roman times. The first church was built as a proprietary church belonging to the Prince-Bishopric of Freising. As late as the 13th century, the parson in charge of the church came from Innichen Abbey, which belonged to the Prince-Bishopric of Freising.

The Gothic, polygonal choir was built in 1414. During the course of the 16th century the Romanesque church was rebuilt. Star-shaped vaults were inserted in the nave, and in 1529 a church porch, also with star-shaped vaults, were built. The tower also received its pointed spire at this time. The chapel dedicated to Saint Erasmus was finished already in 1519.

In 1788, the church lost its position as parish church of Gries. The Muri-Gries Abbey from now on instead served this purpose. The church is surrounded by the old cemetery of the Parish, which since 1922 is closed for new graves. Among the people buried here, Austrian admiral and explorer Bernhard von Wüllerstorf-Urbair is among the more well-known.

== Church fittings ==
The old parish church contains two pieces of art of high value. The one is a Romanesque crucifix, dating from circa 1200 and probably made abroad (possibly northern France). The other is a late Gothic, carved wooden altarpiece made by Michael Pacher.

Pacher made the altarpiece between 1471 and 1475. During the Baroque era, the altarpiece was considered out of date and replaced with a Baroque high altar. Pacher's altarpiece was placed in the St. Erasmus' chapel of the church. It has remained there since; it has however lost its wings, its predella, its top and other details. During the years it has been restored several times, the latest in 1979. Not all restorations have been to the benefit of the altarpiece.

In the middle of the altarpiece, the Coronation of the Virgin by the Trinity is depicted. In the background, angels are holding a brocade drapery, which creates an illusory sense of depth. The scene is framed by tracery pillars which end in pinnacles mounted by angels playing music. Two angels hold the folds of the dress of Mary, creating a linkage with the podium below. In the corners there are statuettes of the Archangel Michael fighting the dragon and Saint Erasmus, respectively. In the background, six painted angels hold the drapery. Two reliefs from the wings of the altarpiece have been preserved and are displayed separately. They depict the Annunciation and the Adoration of the Magi.

The backside of the altarpiece is painted, however not by Pacher. It was probably painted by Conrad Waider from Straubing in 1485–1490.

== Bibliography ==
- Helmut Stampfer, Hubert Walder (1980). Michael Pacher in Bozen-Gries, Second edition, Bozen: Athesia, ISBN 88-7014-173-X. (In German)
- Sebastian Marseiler (2011). Wege zur Kunst. Die bedeutendsten Kunstdenkmäler Südtirols. Athesia, Bozen, ISBN 978-88-8266-734-4, pp. 30–32. (In German)
- Volker Stamm, Hannes Obermair (2011). Zur Ökonomie einer ländlichen Pfarrgemeinde im Spätmittelalter. Das Rechnungsbuch der Marienpfarrkirche Gries (Bozen) von 1422 bis 1440 (Veröffentlichungen des Südtiroler Landesarchivs 33), Bozen: Athesia. ISBN 978-88-8266-381-0 (In German)
