= Le Grice =

Le Grice is a surname, and may refer to:

- Charles Valentine Le Grice (1773–1858), English Anglican priest and writer
- Edwin Le Grice (1911–1992), English Anglican priest
- Malcolm Le Grice (1940–2024), British painter, avant-garde filmmaker and photographer
