= Grice Peters =

English art rock musician

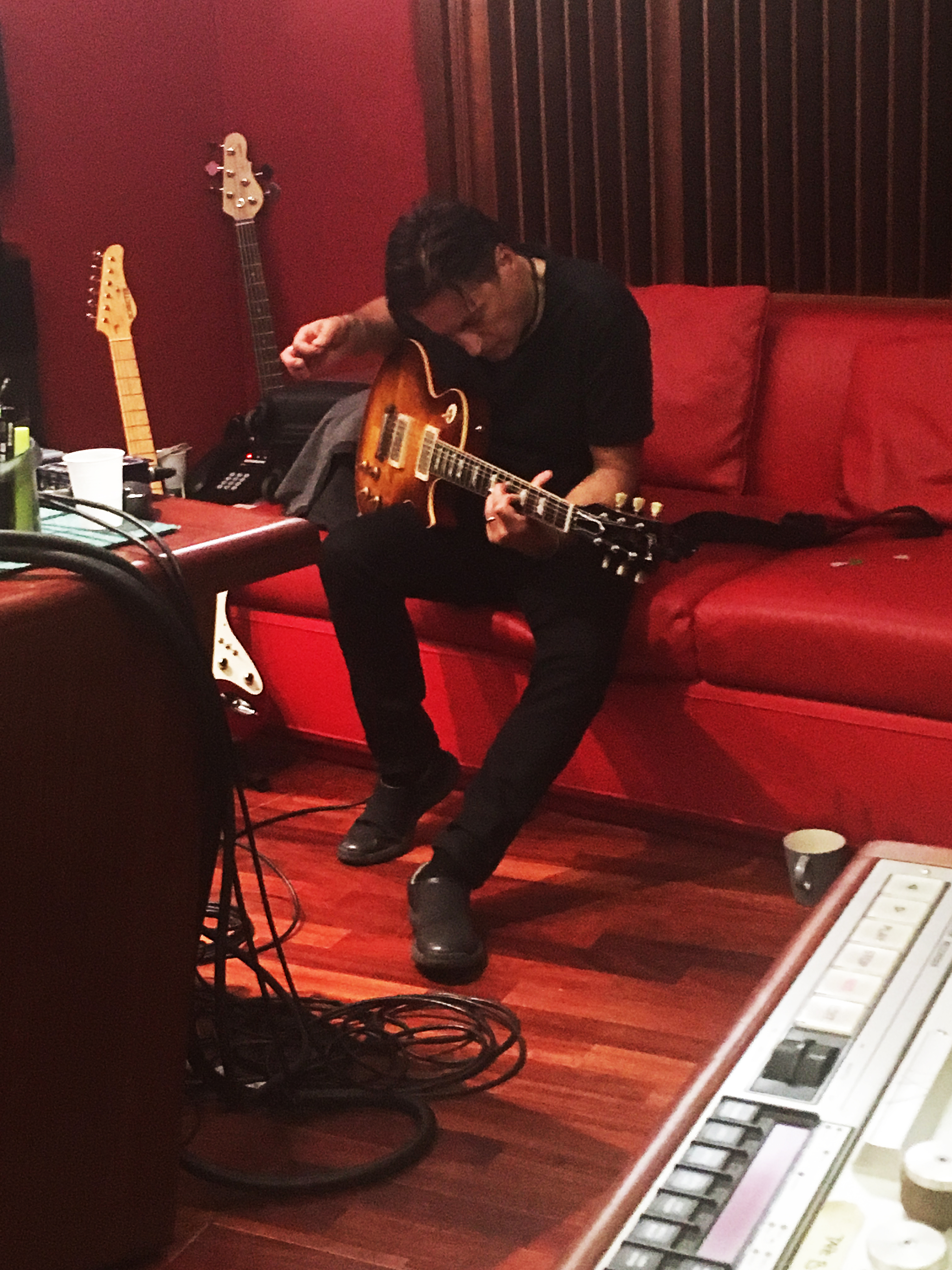

Background information
- Also known as: GRICE
- Born: Martin Charles Grice Peters; Wimbledon, London, England
- Genres: Art rock, progressive rock, experimental
- Occupations: Musician, songwriter, producer
- Instruments: Acoustic guitar, electric guitar, vocals
- Years active: 1990–present
- Labels: hungersleep Records, Burning Shed
- Website: gricemusic.co.uk

Grice Peters (born Martin Charles Grice Peters), also known as GRICE, is a South London-born English art rock musician, singer-songwriter, guitarist, multi-instrumentalist and producer. Peters formed and fronted underground Britpop flavoured bands Laugh Like a Madman, the Burning Martyrs, the Martyrs, SWANSTON and the avant-garde art rock outfit Hungersleep, before starting his solo career.

Peters is also a fellow of The Royal Society of Arts.

== Career ==
In 2012, Peters released his debut solo GRICE album, PROPELLER, which featured saxophonist Raphael Ravenscroft and pedal steel guitarist BJ Cole, as well as a number of contributors including Markus Reuter, 05Ric, and Luca Calabrese amongst others. The album was produced by Lee Fletcher and co-produced by Grice. In 2013, the track "Highly Strung" was remixed by English synthesizer player, keyboardist and composer Richard Barbieri. "Highly Strung" was selected by Tom Robinson and played on his BBC Radio 6 Music Mixtape show. In 2015, GRICE released his second album ALEXANDRINE, working again with Richard Barbieri and Steve Jansen. The album also features Hossam Ramzy, the Egyptian born master percussionist and arranger, providing signature percussive soundscapes and arrangements. The track "She's in My Garden" was supported by Tom Robinson and played on his BBC Radio 6 Music radio show. In 2017, GRICE released a five track EP, The Grey of Granite Stone. In 2019, he released One Thousand Birds and was invited as a special guest on Tom Robinson's Saturday night show on BBC Radio 6 Music. In 2020, he released his One Thousand Birds Symphony album combining field recordings of birdsong with an illustrious cast of musicians. His fifth album Polarchoral was released in 2022.

== Reviews ==
Grice is foremost a songwriter and his songs have been described as: "acoustic rock diamonds" His music has been described as "a restless and challenging cocktail of electro-acoustic glitch, art-rock and avant-pop synthesis". His solo album PROPELLOR has been described as having: "'the intensity of Mark Hollis or Tim Bowness with a Beatle-esque sweetness" and was "highly recommended" by Chris Jones in his writings on inner culture.

It has also been described as having "all the best elements of Talk Talk and Kate Bush" by Paul Gray.

== Awards and achievements ==
The track "Highly Strung" from the debut solo album Propeller, EP was featured on the "Cod Bluff" covermount CD of the September 2012 edition 30 of Classic Rock presents PROG magazine and was reviewed in Classic Rock presents PROG magazine in the May2012 edition who described the album as "Extraordinary slice of experimental rock".

Propeller was shortlisted for Music Producers Guild (MPG) Awards 2013 'UK album of the year' category.

The album was reviewed in The Musician (Summer edition of the Musicians Union Journal 2012) and described as: “a poignant debut of remarkable quality”

In 2014, GRICE Peters was invited to become a fellow of the Royal Society of Arts.

== Radio ==
GRICE's debut BBC radio broadcast was on Tom Robinsons BBC Radio 6 Music Introducing Mixtape show on 26 August 2013 when he played the track "Highly Strung" (Richard Barbieri Remix).

GRICE has performed on-air on BBC Radio Devon and at Sound Gallery Studios in session for Phonic FM.

On 6 July 2019, GRICE was invited as special guest on the Tom Robinson Show on BBC Radio 6 Music, where he was interviewed and Robinson aired tracks from Propeller, Alexandrine and One Thousand Birds.

== Tours and appearances ==
GRICE has appeared in concert in the UK as part of his "Tour of Duty".

In December 2012, GRICE sang at The IB Expo in Halmstad, Sweden with Richard Barbieri and Steve Hogarth singing on the premier performance of the track "Naked" from the Hogarth, Barbieri album, Not the Weapon but the Hand.

In March 2014, GRICE performed at The A2D Music Expo. in Exeter

In March 2017, GRICE performed a mini tour with Barbieri. which culminated in a live performance at Hoxton Hall in London. in Exeter

== Discography ==
=== EPs ===
- The Burning Martyrs (1991)
- The Martyrs (1995)
- Glorious Swanston (1999)
- Cocktail Punks (2002)
- PROPELLER (2012)
- Alexandrine (2015)
- Refractions (2016)
- The Grey of Granite Stone (2017)
- One Thousand Birds (2019)
- One Thousand Birds Symphony (2021)
- Polarchoral (2022)

=== Singles ===
- "Highly Strung" (Richard Barbieri Remix) (2013)
- "She's in My Garden" (Richard Barbieri Remix) (2016)
