= Grice Inn =

Historic building in the US

- U.S. National Register of Historic Places
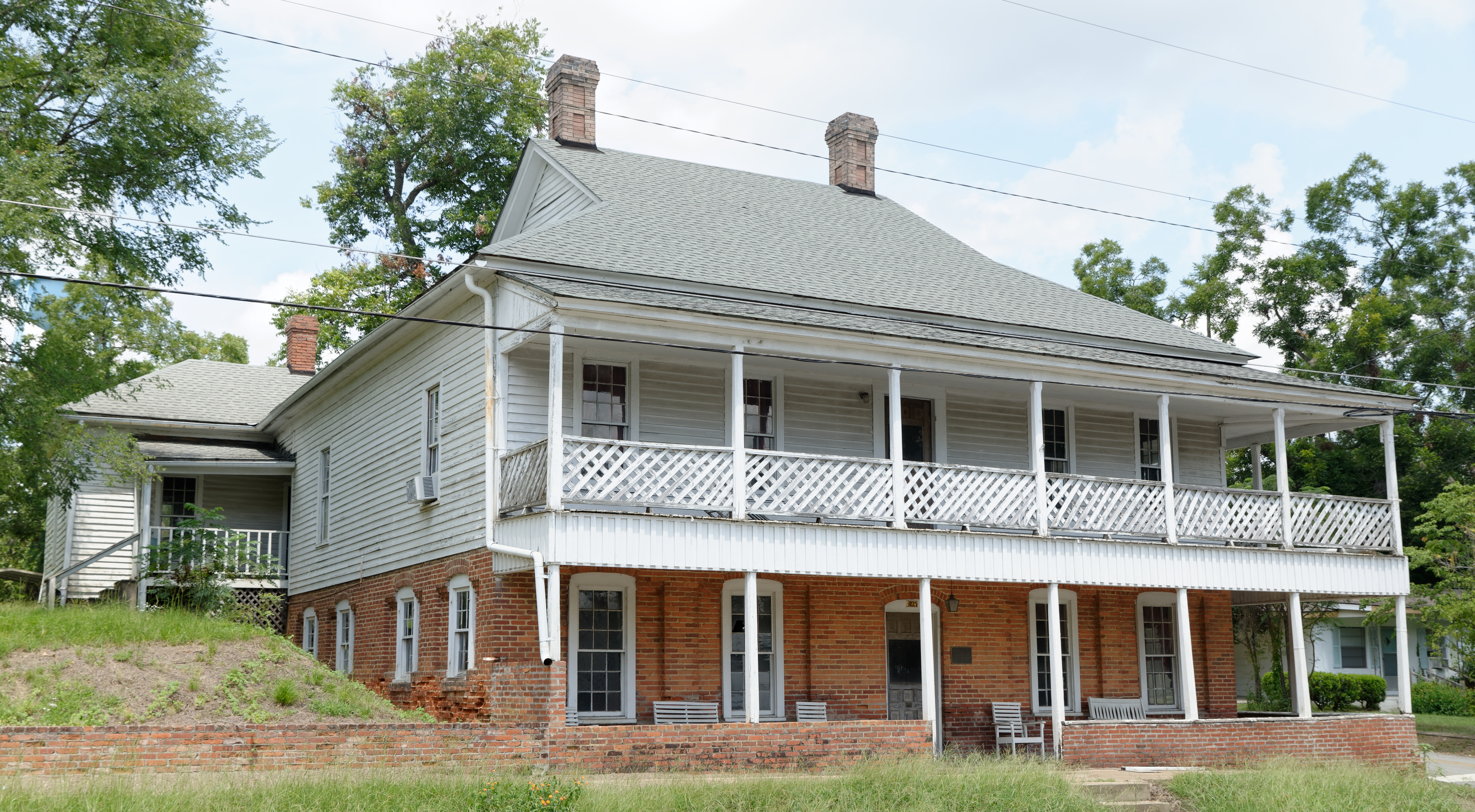
- Grice Inn in 2018

- Location within Georgia
- Location: E. Elm St., Wrightsville, Georgia
- Coordinates: 32.72966°N 82.71625°W
- Area: less than one acre
- Built: 1905
- Built by: Grice, J.R.
- Architectural style: French Colonial, vernacular
- NRHP reference No.: 78000993
- Added to NRHP: July 20, 1978

The Grice Inn is a hotel built in 1905 on East Elm St. in Wrightsville, Johnson County, Georgia. It was listed on the National Register of Historic Places (NRHP) in 1978.

It was built by J.R. Grice as a hotel and home for his family. The NRHP nomination asserts it is "an unusual example of vernacular architecture whose form is unique to Middle Georgia, and contains stylistic elements unprecedented in the state. It is a landmark to the community of Wrightsville, haying played a significant role in the development of this small rural town during the period of its greatest growth."
