= The Best of Odetta: Ballads and Blues =

Greatest hits album by Odetta
- Released: 1994
- Recorded: 1956–1957
- Genre: Folk, blues
- Length: 50:46
- Label: Tradition

Odetta chronology
Movin' It On (1987)	The Best of Odetta: Ballads and Blues (1994)	To Ella (1998)

Alternative Cover

The Best of Odetta: Ballads and Blues is a compilation album by American folk singer Odetta, originally released in 1994.

The focus of the material is the music Odetta performed when recording for the Tradition label — Odetta Sings Ballads and Blues (1956) and Odetta at the Gate of Horn (1957). Tradition released The Best of Odetta on LP with a slightly different track list in 1967.

It was also re-released on CD on the Collectables label in 2006.

Professional ratings
Review scores
Source	Rating
Allmusic	3/5 stars

== Track listing ==
All songs Traditional unless otherwise noted.

1. "He's Got the Whole World in His Hands" – 1:59
2. "Lowlands" – 2:41
3. "The Fox" – 1:53
4. "The Lass from the Low Countree" (John Jacob Niles) – 4:40
5. "Devilish Mary" – 1:57
6. "Take This Hammer" (Ledbetter) – 3:33
7. "Greensleeves" – 2:49
8. "Deep River" – 3:00
9. "Chilly Winds" – 2:43
10. "If I Had a Ribbon Bow" (Huey Prince, Lou Singer) – 2:43
11. "Shame and Scandal" (Sir Lancelot) – 2:23
12. "'Buked and Scorned" – 2:40
13. "Joshua" – 1:54
14. "Glory, Glory" – 2:13
15. "Been in the Pen" – 2:32
16. "Deep Blue Sea" – 3:02
17. "God's Gonna Cut You Down" – 1:51
18. Spiritual Trilogy" – 6:05

== Personnel ==
- Odetta – vocals, guitar
- Bill Lee – bass
