= Odetta (disambiguation) =

Odetta Holmes (1930–2008) was an American singer, actress, guitarist, songwriter, and human rights activist.

Odetta may also refer to:

- Three albums by the singer:
  - Odetta (1963 album), a compilation album
  - Odetta (1967 album), a studio album
  - Odetta (Silverwolf album) or To Ella, a 1998 live album
- Odetta (gastropod), a genus of sea snails
- Susannah Dean (also referred to as Odetta Holmes and Detta Walker), a fictional character from Stephen King's The Dark Tower series
