= Odetta (1963 album) =

Compilation album by Odetta
- Released: 1963
- Recorded: 1956–63
- Genre: Folk, blues, country blues
- Label: Everest
- Producer: Various - Dean Gitter ("Ballads & Blues"), et al.

Odetta chronology
Odetta Sings Folk Songs (1963)	Odetta (1963)	It's a Mighty World (1964)

Odetta compilations chronology
Odetta (1963)	The Best of Odetta (1967)

Odetta is a 1963 compilation album by American folk singer Odetta. Odetta is the first official compilation of Odetta songs. It features songs from her two albums on the Tradition label, Odetta Sings Ballads and Blues and At the Gate of Horn and a few tracks from Odetta and Larry LP, The Tin Angle.

It had a poorer reputation than the above-mentioned original albums, being seen as thrown-together by the label. This LP has subsequently not been released on CD like those three albums. As a result, this album is rarer than most Odetta releases; the album is sometimes quoted as being released on "01-01-63", but this is probably not true, and rather a result of computer-automation on one music website which led to others quoting it as fact.

== Track listing ==
Side A:

1. "Greensleeves" (Traditional)
2. "Midnight Special" (Traditional)
3. "Easy Rider" (Traditional)
4. "Alabama Bound" (Lead Belly)
5. "Spiritual Trilogy":
  1. "Oh, Freedom" (Traditional)
  2. "Come and Go with Me" (Traditional)
  3. "I'm on My Way'" (Traditional)

Side B:

1. "Timber" (Sam Gary)
2. "Deep River" (Traditional)
3. "Chilly Winds" (Traditional)
4. "Santy Anno" (Traditional)
5. "Jack o' Diamonds" (Traditional)
6. "Deep Blue Sea"(Traditional)
