= Odetta Sings Dylan =

Studio album by Odetta
- Released: March 1965
- Studio: RCA Victor Studios, New York City
- Genre: Folk, blues, acoustic, covers
- Length: 52:27 (LP); 59:02 (CD)
- Label: RCA Victor
- Producer: Jack Somer

Odetta chronology
Odetta Sings of Many Things (1964)	Odetta Sings Dylan (1965)	Odetta in Japan (1966)

Odetta Sings Dylan is an album by American folk singer Odetta, issued by RCA Victor in 1965. It consists of covers of Bob Dylan songs.

== Background ==
Odetta was a civil rights activist. Although she grew up in the city, she described black folk music and spirituals as "liberation songs" and used this music to "do my teaching and preaching, my propagandizing." Both Odetta and Bob Dylan sang at the 1963 Civil Rights March in Washington DC.

When this album was recorded, Bob Dylan was only just turning away from his protest singer phase and had not yet released music done with electric instruments. His songs "Blowin' in the Wind" (which Odetta had recorded earlier) and "The Times They Are a-Changin'" were still anthems of the civil rights movement, and "With God on Our Side" and "Masters of War" are longer, bitter anti-war songs.

Yet Odetta also made sure to include love songs, and other not obviously political tracks written by Bob Dylan, transformed by her powerful voice. In addition to a number of well-known Dylan compositions, a couple of fairly obscure songs were included, including "Baby, I'm in the Mood for You".

This album was re-released on CD in the UK by RCA Records in 2000. "Blowin' in the Wind" (which first appeared on Odetta Sings Folk Songs, 1963) and "Paths of Victory" (Odetta Sings of Many Things, 1964) were added as bonus tracks.

== Reception ==
Professional ratings
Review scores
Source	Rating
AllMusic	4.5/5 stars
Record Mirror	4/5 stars

In his review for AllMusic, critic Richie Unterberger wrote of the album, "other than an obscure 1964 album by Linda Mason, it was the very first album of Dylan covers. And in part it was because, unlike most of the artists who would take a swing at the concept, Odetta was actually a major folk musician, one who had done much to inspire Dylan himself. But most of all, it was because the arrangements were excellent."

== Track listing ==
- All songs composed by Bob Dylan.
- Marked [*] are bonus tracks, on 2000 CD edition
1. "Baby, I'm in the Mood for You" – 2:50
2. "Long Ago, Far Away" – 2:50
3. "Don't Think Twice, It's All Right" – 5:42
4. "Tomorrow Is a Long Time" – 6:20
5. "Masters of War" – 6:18
6. "Walkin' Down the Line" – 4:01
7. "The Times They Are A-Changin'" – 4:39
8. "With God on Our Side" – 5:13
9. "Long Time Gone" – 3:44
10. "Mr. Tambourine Man" – 10:44
11. "Blowin' in the Wind" – 4:11 [*]
12. "Paths of Victory" – 2:24 [*]

== Personnel ==
- Odetta – vocals, guitar
- Bruce Langhorne – guitar, tambourine
- Peter Childs – guitar
- Les Grinage (aka Raphael Grinage) – bass

Technical

- Bob Simpson – engineer

== See also ==
- List of songs written by Bob Dylan
- List of artists who have covered Bob Dylan songs
