= Odetta in Japan =

Live album by Odetta
- Released: 1965
- Genre: Folk, blues, acoustic
- Label: RCA Victor
- Producer: Jack Somer

Odetta chronology
Odetta Sings Dylan (1965)	Odetta in Japan (1965)	Odetta (1967)

Odetta in Japan is a live album by American folk singer Odetta, released in 1965. It was her final album for RCA Victor.

The song "Sakura" went on to become an iconic hip-hop sample of the 1990s, as featured in East Flatbush Project's "Tried By 12".

== Track listing ==
All tracks arranged by Odetta; except where indicated:

1. "If I Had a Hammer" (Lee Hays, Pete Seeger) – 1:58
2. "Kaeshite Okure Ima Suguni" (Taku Izumi, Toshio Fujita) – 4:43
3. "The Fox" – 2:00
4. "Chilly Winds" – 3:59
5. "Ain't No More Cane on This Brazos" – 3:40
6. "One Man's Hand" (Alex Comfort, Pete Seeger) – 3:10
7. "On Top of Old Smokey" (Traditional) – 3:40
8. "Sakura" – 2:22
9. "Hush Little Baby" – 1:21
10. "Why Oh Why" (Woody Guthrie) – 3:10
11. "Joshua Fought The Battle of Jericho" – 2:10
12. "We Shall Overcome" (Frank Hamilton, Guy Carawan, Pete Seeger, Zilphia Horton) – 5:23

== Personnel ==
- Odetta – vocals, guitar
- Bruce Langhorne – guitar
- Les Grinage (aka Raphael Grinage) – bass
