= Odetta Sings of Many Things =

Studio album by Odetta
- Released: 1964
- Genre: Folk, blues, acoustic
- Label: RCA Victor

Odetta chronology
It's a Mighty World (1964)	Odetta Sings of Many Things (1964)	Odetta Sings Dylan (1965)

Professional ratings
Review scores
Source	Rating
Record Mirror	3/5 stars

Odetta Sings of Many Things is an album by American folk singer Odetta, issued by RCA Victor in 1964.

== Track listing ==
1. "Troubled" – 2:25
2. "Miss Katy Cruel" – 1:57
3. "Anathea" – 4:32
4. "Sun's Comin' Up" – 2:55
5. "Boy" – 3:44
6. "Looky Yonder" – 3:15
7. "Froggy Went A-Courtin'" – 2:25
8. "Poor Wayfaring Stranger" – 3:55
9. "Four Marys" – 4:35
10. "Paths of Victory" (Bob Dylan) – 2:25
11. "Sea Lion Woman" – 1:20
12. "Deportee" – 2:25

== Personnel ==
- Odetta – vocals, guitar
- Bruce Langhorne – guitar, tambourine
- Les Grinage (a.k.a. Raphael Grinage)– bass
