= Odetta (1967 album) =

Studio album by Odetta
- Released: 1967 (LP)
- Genre: Folk, pop, jazz, gospel
- Length: 32:01
- Label: Verve Folkways, FTS-3014
- Producer: Jim Dickinson

Odetta chronology
Odetta in Japan (1966)	Odetta (1967)	The Best of Odetta (1967)

Odetta is the 1967 album by Odetta. It is viewed as one of her most "commercial" (that is, aimed at mainstream audiences), but it has not subsequently been re-released on CD as many of her other albums were.

It should not be confused with other self-titled albums by Odetta on different labels: the 1963 compilation LP Odetta on the Everest label and 2003's Odetta which is actually the album To Ella.

== Reception ==
Professional ratings
Review scores
Source	Rating
Allmusic	2.5/5 stars

Allmusic stated in their review that "She also acquits herself fairly well on cuts that strike a sort of funky lounge jazz mood, although those songs aren't memorable. Overall, it's a curiosity, not too embarrassing, but not matching her with the settings that suit her best."

== Track listing ==
Side A:

1. "Give Me Your Hand" (Odetta Gordon) – 2:45
2. "Strawberry Fields Forever" (John Lennon, Paul McCartney) – 3:28
3. "Love Songs of the Nile" (Nacio Herb Brown, Arthur Freed)– 3:22
4. "Oh, My Babe" (adapted and arranged by Odetta Gordon) – 3:10
5. "Little Red Caboose" (adapted and arranged by Odetta Gordon) – 2:00
6. "Child of God" (Odetta Gordon, Leslie Grenage) – 2:18

Side B:

1. "Hogan's Alley" (adapted and arranged by Odetta Gordon) – 1:52
2. "Little Girl Blue" (Richard Rodgers, Lorenz Hart) – 3:36
3. "African Prayer" (Odetta Gordon) – 3:18
4. "Oh Papa" (adapted and arranged by Odetta Gordon) – 2:49
5. "Turn Me 'Round" (adapted and arranged by Odetta Gordon) – 3:23

== Personnel ==
- Odetta – vocals, guitar
- Les Grinage (aka Raphael Grinage) – bass
- John Foster – piano
- John Seiter – drums

Technical

- Jerry Schoenbaum – production supervisor
- Val Valentin – director of engineering
- David Krieger – cover, design
