= It's a Mighty World =

Studio album by Odetta
- Released: 1964
- Studio: RCA Victor Studio A, New York City
- Genre: Folk, blues, acoustic
- Label: RCA Victor
- Producer: Jack A. Somer

Odetta chronology
Odetta (1964)	It's a Mighty World (1964)	Odetta Sings of Many Things (1964)

Professional ratings
Review scores
Source	Rating
Record Mirror	3/5 stars

It's a Mighty World is an album by American folk singer Odetta, released by RCA Victor in 1964.

== Track listing ==
All tracks arranged by Odetta Gordon

1. "It's a Mighty World" (Odetta Gordon) – 2:22
2. "I've Been Told" – 2:40
3. "Reminiscing" – 2:23
4. "Hush Hush Mamie" – 2:25
5. "Camphorated Oil" – 1:35
6. "Bull Jine Run (Clear The Track)" – 2:10
7. "Come a Lady´s Dream" – 1:49
8. "Sweet Potatoes" – 2:03
9. "Chevrolet" (Lonnie Young) – 2:45
10. "Love Proved False (Waly, Waly)" – 4:25
11. "One Man's Hand" (Alex Comfort, Pete Seeger) – 3:58
12. "Got My Mind on Freedom" (Traditional) – 4:00

== Personnel ==
- Odetta – vocals, guitar
- Bruce Langhorne – second guitar
- Les Grinage (a.k.a. Raphael Grinage) – bass

Technical

- Mickey Crofford – engineer
