= The Front Page Club =

The Front Page Club was a late-night live music venue in Carlisle, Cumbria, founded by Bob Mungall and Martin Lawson in August 1984. It had previously been a traditional jazz club called Mick’s, named after the proprietor Mick Potts, band leader of the Gateway Jazz Band and a locally well-known pianist and trumpet player. Mungall and Lawson widened the musical brief of the club to include modern jazz artists such as Tommy Smith, Snake Davis, Tommy Chase, Xero Slingsby & The Works and Gary Boyle. Later they promoted blues, rock, reggae and country music acts, both in the club and in other larger Carlisle venues. Despite its limited capacity of only 132, The Front Page became well established on the circuit of northern live music venues and attracted artists from all over Britain and live music fans from a wide area of northern England and southern Scotland.

Mungall left the club in 1986 to return to his former career as a ship’s officer. He died from a brain tumour in Fort Lauderdale, Florida, USA in 2010 aged 57. Peter Stuart continued to run the club and produce the 'Live at the Front Page' recordings until New Year's eve 1988. The club was sold to Stuart Murphy, but after a brief period of closure it reopened as Jackson’s, named after the new owner David Jackson. He revived The Front Page name and it continued as a music venue until final closure in 2004, a month short of the 20th anniversary of its opening.

== Musicians ==
Among the musicians to play at The Front Page during the first four years were former Small Faces member Steve Marriott with his band Packet of Three; Trevor Burton, one of the founding members of The Move; Basil Gabbidon of the reggae band Steel Pulse; Brendan Croker and Steve Phillips, members of The Notting Hillbillies; Pentangle founder Bert Jansch and saxophonist and club owner Ronnie Scott. The club also promoted artists such as Keith Tippett (October 31, 1984) and Jack Bruce (May 3, 1985) at the Tithebarn in Carlisle, and The Hank Wangford Band at the Sands Centre in Carlisle. The Bhundu Boys made their English debut at The Front Page in May 1986. The last band to play The Front Page before its first period of closure on New Year's Eve 1988 was You Slosh, led by the multi-instrumentalist Troy Donockley who later joined the power-rock band Nightwish. During the years 1984-1988 between 300 and 400 bands or individual artists appeared live at The Front Page.

== Recordings ==
Brendan Croker & the 5 O’Clock Shadows digitally recorded a live session at The Front Page on May 5, 1987 which was released on cassette by Front Page Records.
