= Movin' It On =

Live album by Odetta
- Released: 1987
- Recorded: November 22, 1986
- Venue: The Wisconsin Union Theatre, Madison, Wisconsin
- Genre: Folk, blues
- Label: Rose Quartz
- Producer: Elizabeth Karlin

Odetta chronology
Odetta at the Best of Harlem (1976)	Movin' It On (1987)	The Best of Odetta: Ballads and Blues (1994)

Movin' It On is a live album by American folk singer Odetta, released in 1987. It is a recording of a concert at The Wisconsin Union Theatre, Madison, Wisconsin and was her first release in 12 years. It is out of print.

Professional ratings
Review scores
Source	Rating
AllMusic	3/5 stars

== Track listing ==
1. "Give Me Your Hand"
2. "Sail Away, Ladies"
3. Suite, Ancestors 1:
  1. "Roll on Buddy"
  2. "Take This Hammer"
  3. "Lowlands"
  4. "Deep Blue Sea"
  5. "Michael Rowed the Boat Ashore"
4. Suite, Ancestors 2:
  1. "Ol' Howard's Dead & Gone"
  2. "House of the Rising Sun"
  3. "When I Was a Young Girl "
  4. "Ol' Howard "
  5. "Irene, Goodnight" (Lead Belly, Alan Lomax)
5. "Movin' It On" (Odetta Gordon)
6. "This Little Light Of Mine" (Harry Loes)

== Personnel ==
- Odetta – vocals, guitar, body percussion (left foot)

Technical

- Marv Nonn – recording, mixing, engineer
