= Steve Phillips (musician) =

English musician (born in 1948)

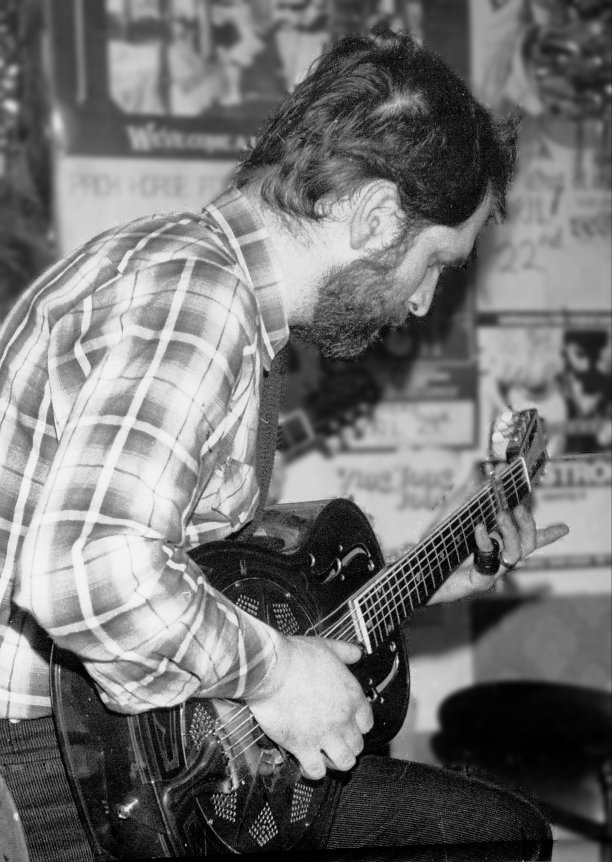
- Steve Phillips onstage in Leeds, England, 1978, with his vintage National guitar

Background information
- Born: Nicholas Stephen Phillips; 18 February 1948 (age 78); London, England
- Origin: Leeds, England
- Genres: Blues, country
- Occupations: Musician, composer, guitar maker, painter
- Instruments: Acoustic and electric guitar
- Years active: 1968 – present
- Website: www.facebook.com/stevephillipsmusic

Nicholas Stephen Phillips (born 18 February 1948) is an English blues and country musician, as well as guitar maker (under the name "N.S. Phillips") and painter. He is mainly renowned for being part of the supergroup The Notting Hillbillies along with the Dire Straits frontman Mark Knopfler and Brendan Croker.

== Biography ==
Phillips was born in London, England, on 18 February 1948, but when still a child his family moved to Leeds, where he has lived for most of his life. His father, Harry Phillips, was a sculptor (Harry Phillips inspired Mark Knopfler to write the song "In the Gallery," from the debut Dire Straits album), and his mother was a painter. At the age of 13, Phillips began learning to play guitar and started playing in different pubs in Leeds. In 1965, at the age of 17, he formed a band called Easy Mr. Steve's Bootleggers in which he mainly played piano. The group eventually recorded some demos but these were not released until 1996. They split up in 1967, although the various musicians continued to work together in different combinations from time to time.

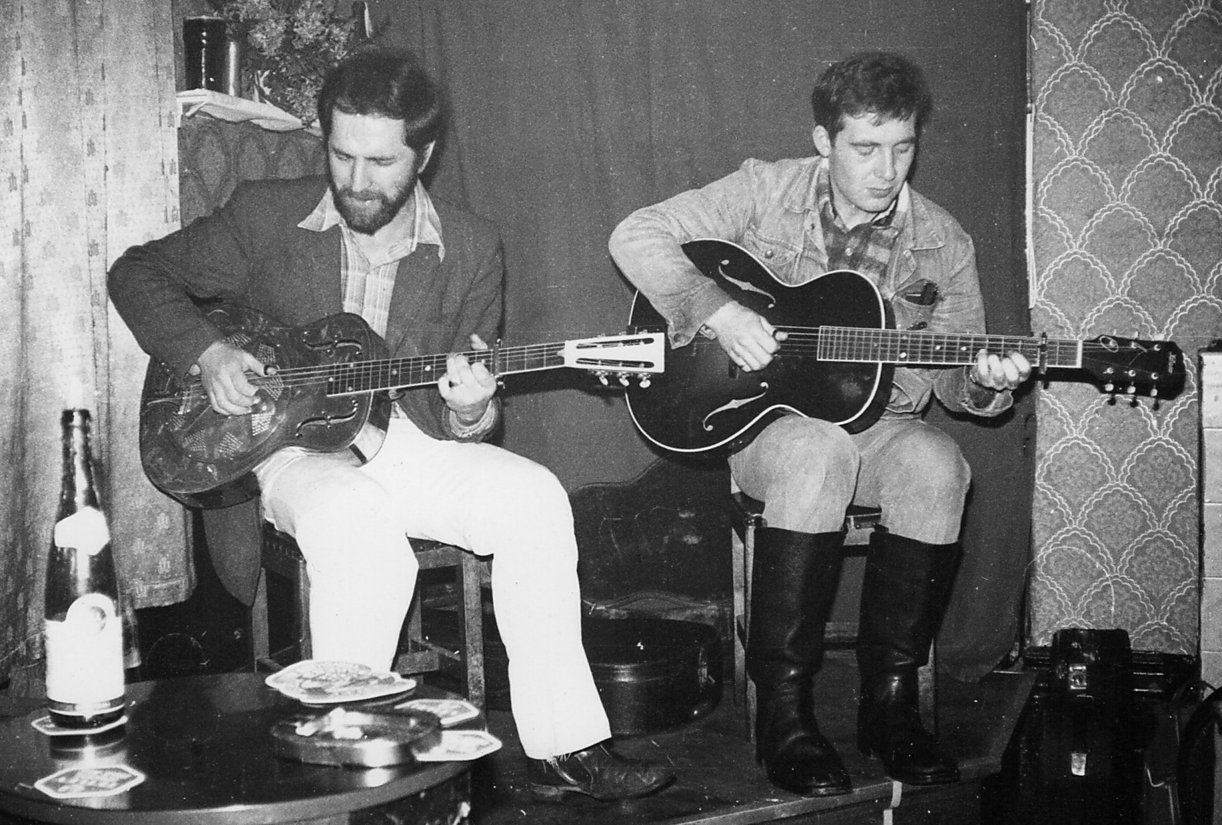
Steve Phillips (left) and Brendan Croker onstage in Leeds, 1978

In 1968, after buying his first steel resonator guitar, a vintage National, he played many solo gigs in Leeds pubs. Then, Mark Knopfler, a junior reporter working for The Yorkshire Evening Post, called Phillips to get an interview. They soon become friends and started playing together. Their stage name was The Duolian String Pickers. They went on playing in different pubs. Finally, in 1973, Knopfler left Leeds and moved to London to become part of Brewers Droop and, afterwards, founded Dire Straits, with whom he finally reached mainstream recognition.

By the mid-1970s, Phillips had met the Bradford-born songwriter, singer and guitarist Brendan Croker. They opened a club in a Leeds pub called The Packhorse, where they also played guitar. As a side project, Phillips spent his spare time painting. Finally, in the 1980s, Phillips was persuaded to release his first album, The Best of Steve Phillips. Recorded between 1977 and 1986, the album contained fourteen tracks, only one of which was self-composed: the rest were classic country blues and ragtime instrumentals by such artists as Blind Willie McTell, Big Bill Broonzy and Blind Blake. In 1990, he released a second album, Steel-Rail Blues, which contained more of his own compositions as well as arrangements of others' songs.

Knopfler, already famous as the leader of Dire Straits, offered to produce Phillips's next album for him. However, following an impromptu gig in May 1986 at the Grove Inn in Leeds (one of the city's celebrated musical venues) in which Knopfler joined Phillips and Croker, Phillips suggested that they form a band along with Croker (who had also released a couple of albums with his band The 5 O'Clock Shadows). This idea became The Notting Hillbillies. Through this group, Phillips achieved a wider recognition that allowed him to go on releasing his full solo albums and to enhance his career.

Phillips went on releasing albums throughout the 1990s. He has worked with a wide group of musicians whom he calls on for band gigs; they were at one time called The Famous Five but are now known as The Rough Diamonds. Most of these musicians (and other guests) have appeared on his albums, except for his most recent, Solo (2005) which is Phillips on his own. (These recordings are difficult to find outside the UK, despite the fact that Phillips is internationally known as a blues singer and guitarist and has undertaken several overseas tours, notably in Italy, Spain and Scandinavia). In 1996, Just Pickin' was released; an album that gathered previously unreleased demos with Easy Mr Steve's Bootleggers, Mark Knopfler, Brendan Croker and other musicians. These recordings spanned nearly thirty years, from 1965 to 1981.

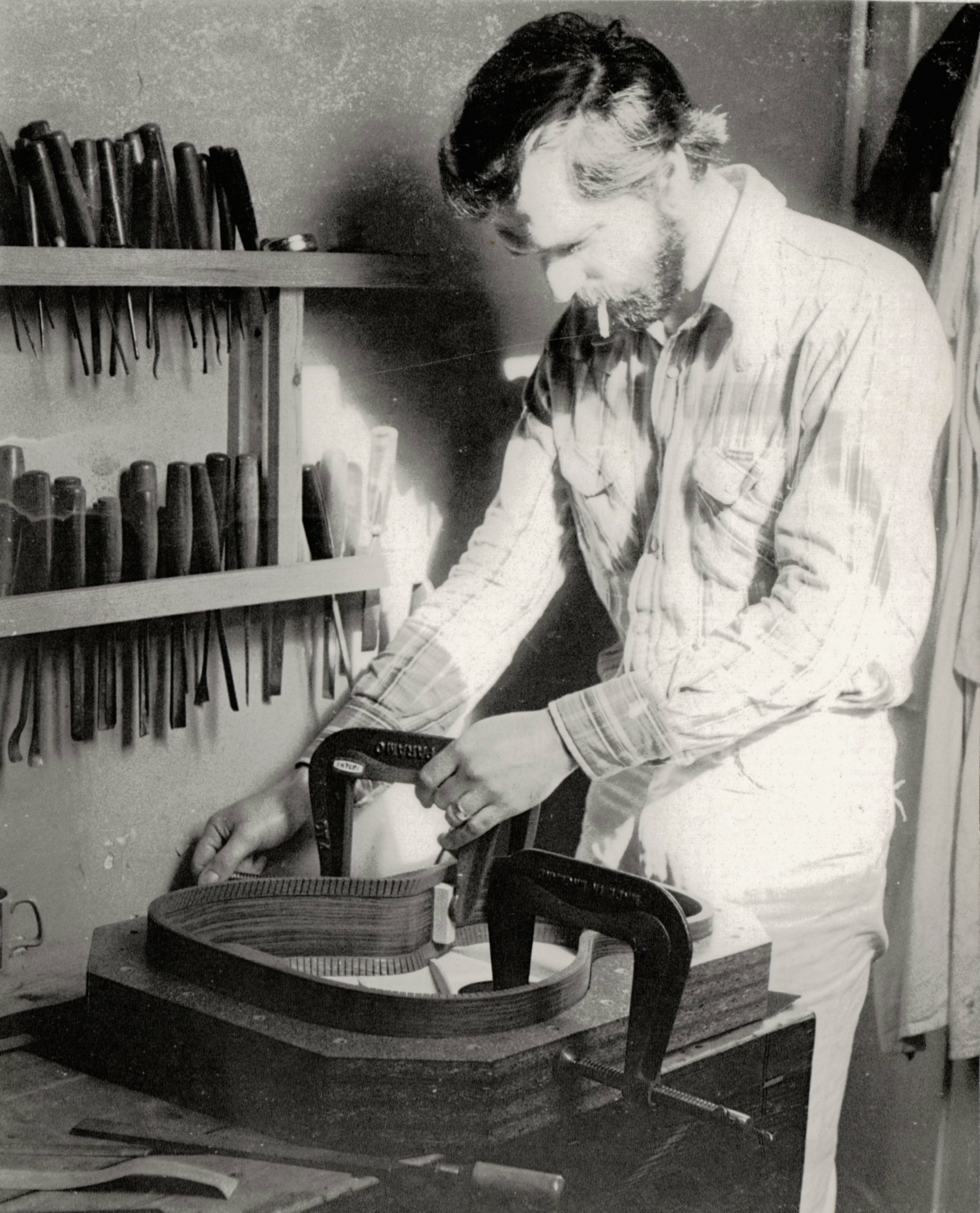
Phillips in his guitar making workshop in Leeds, 1979

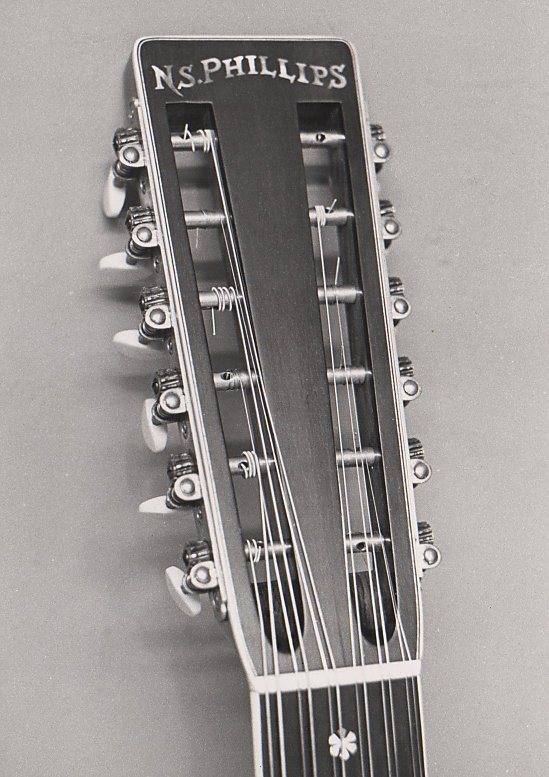
Headstock of a 12-string guitar by Steve Phillips

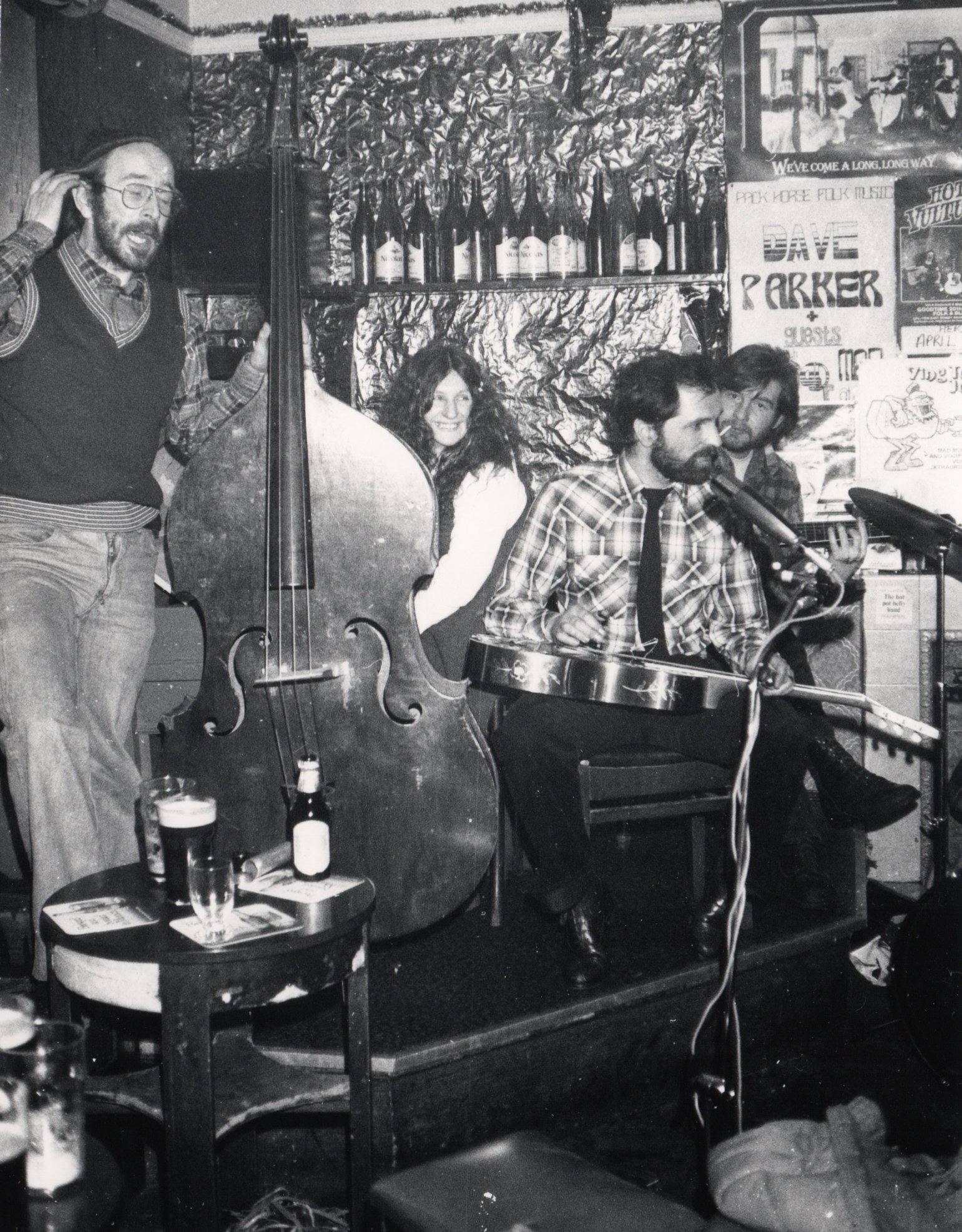
Blues jam at the Packhorse Hotel, Leeds, December 1978. L-R: Sholto Lenaghan, Viv Speight, Steve Phillips, Brendan Croker.

Phillips usually tours solo, with occasional gigs with The Rough Diamonds. He has also played with other solo blues artists such as Ray Stubbs, Doug McLeod and Hans Theessink. He still plays regularly with Croker and appears occasionally with Knopfler and his band, especially for charity fund-raising gigs. When not touring, Steve and The Rough Diamonds play most Tuesday nights at the Grosvenor Hotel in Robin Hood's Bay, North Yorkshire. These informal evenings usually gather a good audience and often feature friends of Phillips and the band 'sitting in' for all or part of the gig. The music ranges from early blues to rock'n'roll, country to Chicago R&B. A live album of material recorded at the Grosvenor in 2007 was issued on 5 November 2012 under the name "Live at the Grosvenor" (aka The Grosvenor Sessions).

Steve Phillips & The Rough Diamonds released North Country Blues on 22 July 2013.

In addition to his skills as a musician, Phillips has made a small number of high quality guitars (under the name "N.S. Phillips") and is also a noted landscape painter, specialising in scenes around his North Yorkshire home area. These paintings are notable for their treatment of North Yorkshire's distinctive but elusive light, and have a luminous quality which renders them instantly recognisable as his work. His album, Been A Long Time Gone, has a detail from one of his paintings on the sleeve.

== Discography ==
- The Best of Steve Phillips (1987)
- Steel-Rail Blues (1990)
- Missing...Presumed Having a Good Time (1990) [with The Notting Hillbillies]
- Been A Long Time Gone (1995)
- Just Pickin' (1996)
- Every One A Gem (2000)
- Solo (2005)
- Live at the Grosvenor (aka The Grosvenor Sessions) (recorded in 2007, released in 2012)
- North Country Blues (2013)

== Guitars ==
A guitar collector as well as a maker, Phillips uses a wide number of them in his live performances. The National Style O which Knopfler uses in songs such as "Romeo & Juliet" and which became a Dire Straits emblem following its appearance on the cover of the Brothers in Arms album, was sold by Phillips in 1980. This is a list of some of the guitars Phillips has used in his live shows; his current main live guitars are marked +

Acoustic guitars:

- Gibson L4 (1924)+
- Martin 00018 (1931)
- Martin 0016C (1964)
- N.S. Phillips 12-string (1977) (known as 'The Wardrobe')
- N.S. Phillips 6-string (1986)+
- Ralph Bown 12 String (1999)+

Electric guitars:

- National lap steel (1936)
- Gibson L-50 (1937)+
- Gibson ES100 (1938)
- Beltona electric resonator (1992) – the prototype of this model. +
- Phillips-Johnson resonator (2002)

Phillip's official website has photographs of many of these instruments.
