= Marcus Cliffe =

English musician

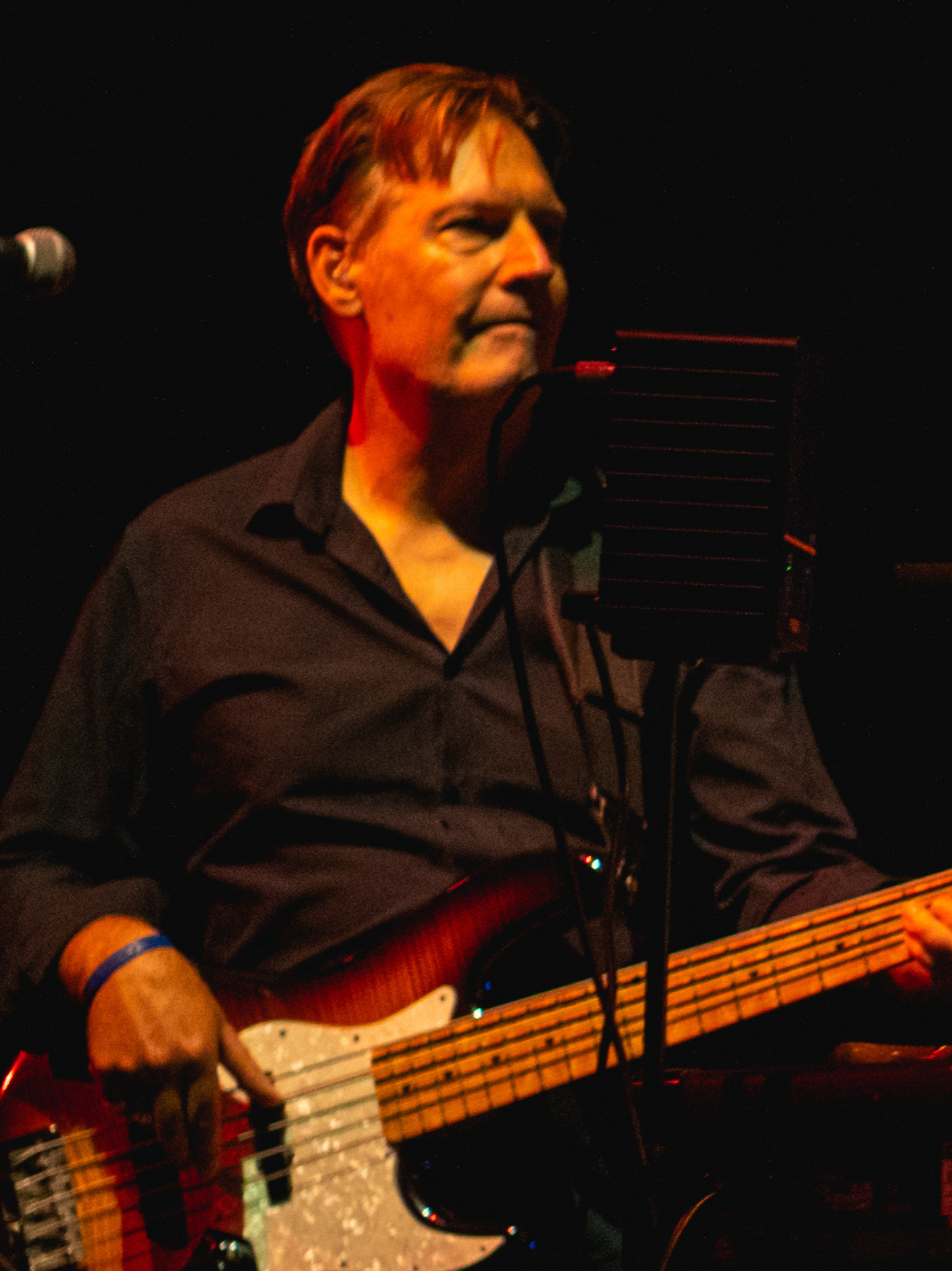
- Cliffe in 2021

Background information
- Born: 1962 (age 63–64); Leeds, England, UK
- Genres: Rock; pop; country; blues; jazz
- Occupation: Musician
- Instruments: bass, vocals
- Years active: 1990–present
- Member of: The Manfreds
- Formerly of: The Notting Hillbillies

Marcus Cliffe (born 1962 in Leeds, Yorkshire, England) is an English musician.

== Career ==
Cliffe learned how to play the piano at age nine. In secondary school, he learned how to play the double bass and the electric bass guitar. He attended Leeds College of Music. It was after graduating from college that he joined "Brendan Croker & the 5 O'Clock Shadows", fronted by Brendan Croker (1953–2023).

In 1990, Marcus and Croker joined The Notting Hillbillies, a country rock project created by Mark Knopfler and Guy Fletcher of Dire Straits. They only recorded one album "Missing...Presumed Having a Good Time".

As of 1999, Cliffe has been the bass player in The Manfreds, a reunion of members of the 1960s pop group Manfred Mann (minus Manfred Mann himself). He has also worked with, amongst others, Brendan Croker, Mark Knopfler, Eric Clapton, and Rod Stewart. Cliffe is also a member of the jazz trio PBD with fellow Manfred musician Mike Hugg.
