= Tomorrow Is a Long Time =

Song written by Bob Dylan

Song by Bob Dylan

from the album Bob Dylan's Greatest Hits Vol. II
- Released: 1971
- Recorded: April 12, 1963
- Studio: Town Hall, New York City
- Genre: Folk
- Length: 3:01
- Label: Columbia Records
- Songwriter: Bob Dylan

"Tomorrow Is a Long Time" is a song written and recorded by Bob Dylan. Dylan's version first appeared on the album Bob Dylan's Greatest Hits Vol. II compilation, released in 1971. It was subsequently included in the triple LP compilation Masterpieces.

== Dylan's versions ==
Dylan's officially released version of the song is a live recording from his April 12, 1963, concert at New York's Town Hall. Dylan had recorded the song in December 1962 as a demo for M. Witmark & Sons, his publishing company. This particular recording, long available as a bootleg, was released by Columbia in 2010 on The Bootleg Series Vol. 9: The Witmark Demos: 1962-1964. A studio version of the song, an outtake from the June 1970 sessions for New Morning, has also been bootlegged.

The song was featured in the first-season finale of The Walking Dead.

In the 2017 film The Vanishing of Sidney Hall the song appears twice: once sung by Logan Lerman and again by Bob Dylan in the closing scene.

== Elvis Presley version ==
Elvis Presley recorded the song on May 26, 1966, during a session for his album How Great Thou Art. The song originally appeared as a bonus track on the album Spinout. Dylan once said that Presley's cover of the song was "the one recording I treasure the most".

According to Ernst Jørgensen 's book Elvis Presley: A Life In Music - The Complete Recording Sessions, Presley first heard the song via Charlie McCoy, who had previously participated in the Highway 61 Revisited and Blonde on Blonde sessions. McCoy played the 1965 Odetta album Odetta Sings Dylan before an Elvis session and Presley "had become taken with 'Tomorrow Is a Long Time'".

Presley's cover was featured in Francis Ford Coppola's 1983 film adaptation of S.E. Hinton's novel The Outsiders.

== Other cover versions ==
- Ian and Sylvia recorded it for their Four Strong Winds album, released July 1963
- Joan Baez performed it during an August 1963 Forest Hills, New York concert; the recording was a bonus track on the 2002 CD reissue of her 1963 Vanguard album Joan Baez in Concert, Part 2
- Judy Collins released on her 1965 album, Judy Collins' Fifth Album
- Odetta Holmes released on her 1965 album Odetta Sings Dylan
- Pozo-Seco Singers released on their 1966 album Time
- Esther & Abi Ofarim released on their 1966 album, The New Esther & Abi Ofarim Album
- Dorris Henderson released on her 1967 album, Watch the Stars
- The Kingston Trio released the song on their 1969 live double album, Once Upon a Time.
- We Five released on their 1970 album, Catch the Wind
- Glenn Yarbrough released on his 1970 album, The Best of Glenn Yarbrough
- Rod Stewart released on his 1971 album Every Picture Tells A Story
- Betsy Legg released on her 1972 album Betsy
- Sandy Denny released on her 1972 self titled album
- Magna Carta recorded it on their album Putting it back together in 1976
- Ulf Dageby of Nationalteatern translated the song to Swedish and released it on their 1978 album Barn av vår tid as Men bara om min älskade väntar. The translated version has since then been covered by a variety of Swedish artists and bands, most notably Joakim Thåström and Mikael Wiehe.
- Chris Hillman released on his 1982 album, Morning Sky
- Nickel Creek released on their 2005 album, Why Should the Fire Die?
- The Seldom Scene included the song on their 2007 album Scenechronized.
- Nick Drake released on his 2007 album of home recordings, Family Tree
- Zé Ramalho released the song on his 2008 album Zé Ramalho Canta Bob Dylan – Tá Tudo Mudando
- Dan Navarro released on his 2009 live album, Live at McCabe's (Dan Navarro with Stonehoney)
- Zee Avi for the 2012 Dylan tribute album Chimes of Freedom: The Songs of Bob Dylan Honoring 50 Years of Amnesty International
- Justin Rutledge released on his 2013 album Valleyheart
- Chely Wright featuring the Milk Carton Kids on her 2016 album I Am the Rain.
- Margo Timmins recorded a version on her album The Ty Tyrfu Sessions released in 2021 but recorded years earlier by Jeff Bird.
- Chrissie Hynde recorded it on her album of Dylan covers Standing in the Doorway in 2021
- Timothée Chalamet performed it as the host and musical guest on Saturday Night Live on January 26, 2025
