= Ed Ward (writer) =

American writer (1948–2021)

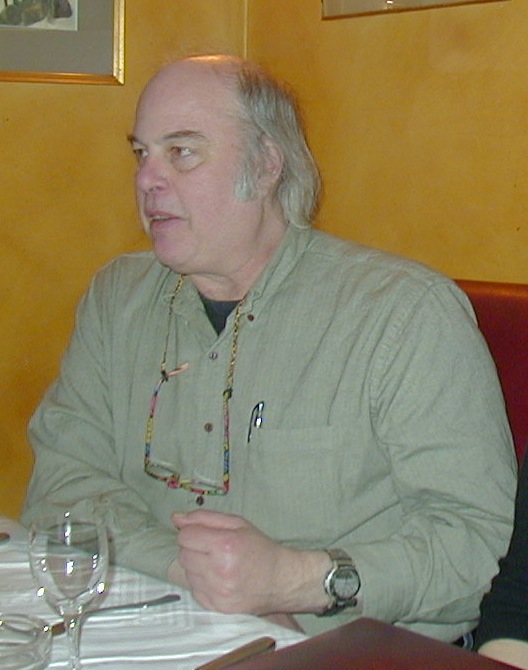
Ed Ward (January 2005)

Edmund Ward (November 2, 1948 – May 3, 2021) was an American writer and radio commentator, the "rock-and-roll historian" for NPR's program Fresh Air from 1987 to 2017 and one of the original founders of Austin's South by Southwest music festival.

Ward grew up in Eastchester, New York. He attended Antioch College and began his music-writing career in 1965.

He was on the staff of Crawdaddy! (1967), Rolling Stone (1970), and Creem (1971–1977) magazines and of the Austin American-Statesman and The Austin Chronicle (where he was honored as part of their annual "Restaurant Poll", lending his name to their "Ed Ward Memorial Sandwich" award). Ward wrote several books on the history of rock-and-roll and has contributed content, with Rashod Ollison, for the PBS website for the documentary series Get Up, Stand Up: The Story of Pop and Protest. In addition to his music history lessons on NPR's Fresh Air he contributed to The New York Times, The Wall Street Journal, and various music magazines. Ward was the original co-host of the "Let It Roll" podcast and appeared on 24 episodes of the series.

Ward lived in Berlin, Germany between 1993 and 2008, when he moved to Montpellier, France. In 2013 he repatriated and was living in Austin, Texas, at the time of his death.

== Works ==
- Rock of Ages: The Rolling Stone History of Rock & Roll (1983), with Geoffrey Stokes and Ken Tucker
- Michael Bloomfield: The Rise and Fall of an American Guitar Hero (1983)
- Ward, Ed (2016). The History of Rock & Roll, Volume 1: 1920-1963. Flatiron Books. ISBN 9781250071163.
- Ward, Ed (2019). The History of Rock & Roll, Volume 2: 1964–1977: The Beatles, the Stones, and the Rise of Classic Rock. Flatiron Books. ISBN 978-1250165190.
