= Just Pickin' =

Studio album by Steve Phillips
- Released: 1996
- Recorded: 1967–1981
- Genre: Country, blues
- Label: Siren

Steve Phillips chronology
Been A Long Time Gone (1995)	Just Pickin' (1996)	Every One A Gem (2000)

Just Pickin' is an album by Steve Phillips. It includes different previously unreleased demos spanning from 1967 to 1981, featuring Brendan Croker, Mark Knopfler and Sholto Lenaghan. It was first released in 1996. An extended version was released in 2002.

== Track listing ==
1. "Just Pickin'" (3:47)
2. "Guitar Rag" (2:37)
3. "Moon Going Down" (5:37)
4. "Let's Go to Town" (3:02)
5. "Don't Drink It in Here" (2:44)
6. "Hometown Rag" (3:10)
7. "Hawkins Rag" (3:02)
8. "Hillbilly Boogie" (2:47)
9. "Swingin' with Lonnie" (2:53)
10. "Blues Stay Away from Me" (2:31)
11. "Dallas Rag" (3:18)
12. "Blue Guitars" (2:55)
13. "Deep Minor Rhythm" (3:01)
14. "My Washwomans Gone" (3:18)
15. "Chimes" (3:52)
16. "Bullfrog Moan" (3:16)
17. "Rolling Down to Memphis Town" (2:42)
18. "You May Leave, But This Will Bring You Back" (2:26)
19. "Cool Drink of Water" (3:35)
20. "I Couldn't Stay There" (3:20)
21. "Boogie Woogie Dance" (4:30)

== Musicians ==
- Daz Boyle - washboard [5]
- Pete Boyle - guitar [5]
- Kevin Conlon - guitar [15], bass [18]
- Brendan Croker - guitar [3–4, 8, 9, 10, 19, 20–21], banjo [18]
- Mick Dewhurst - jug [5]
- Viv Fisher - piano [21]
- Mark Knopfler - guitar [1, 6, 7, 11]
- Sholto Lenaghan - bass [8–10, 21], guitar [12–14, 16–17], ukulele [15], mandolin [18]
- Steve Phillips - guitar [1–4, 6, 8–10, 12–21], mandolin [7, 11], piano [5]
- Les Staves - drums [21]
