= The Manfreds =

British pop group

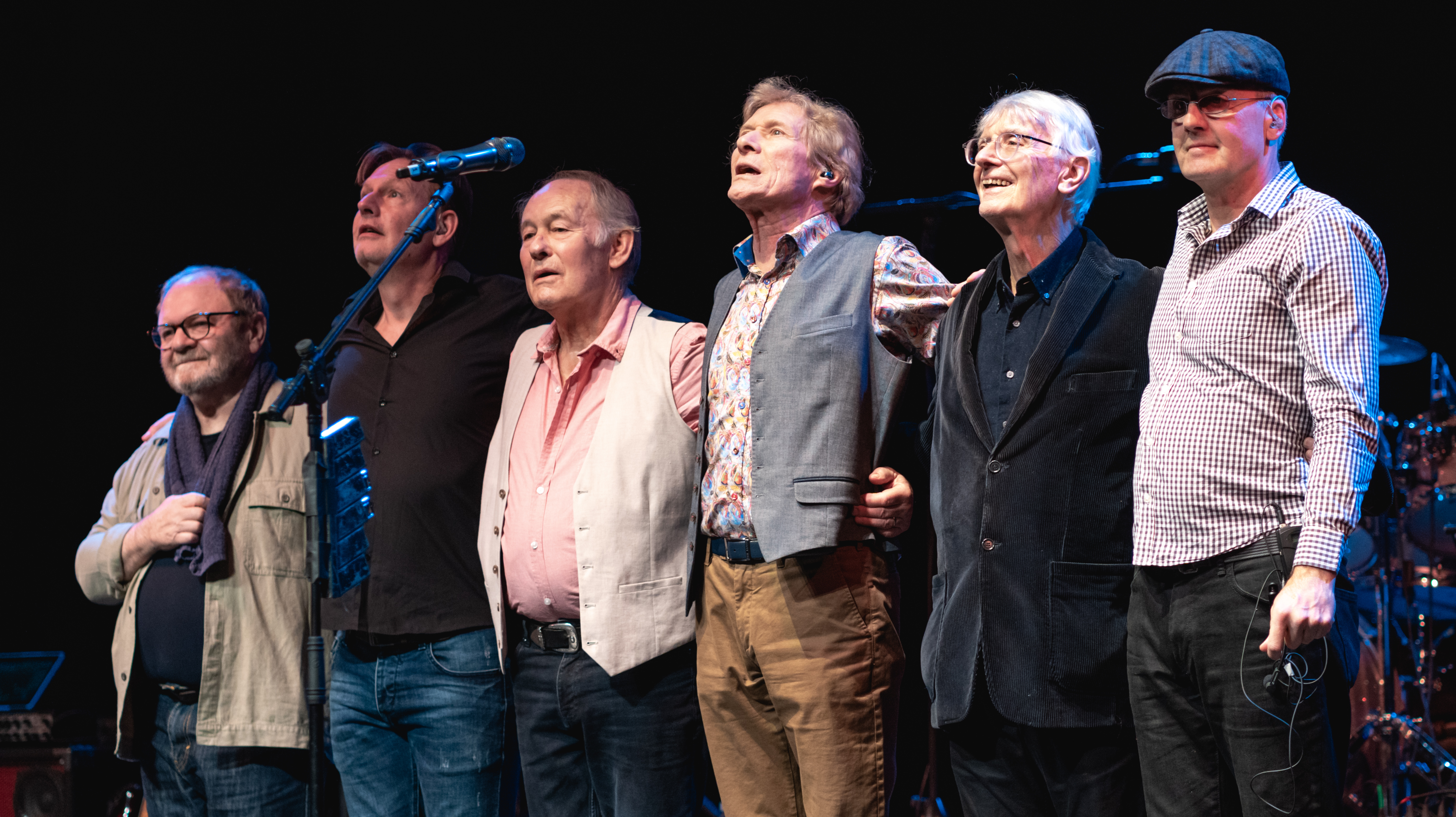
- The Manfreds in 2021

Background information
- Origin: London, England
- Genres: Beat, R&B
- Years active: 1992–present
- Labels: BMG/Camden
- Members: Paul Jones; Mike Hugg; Tom McGuinness; Rob Townsend; Marcus Cliffe; Simon Currie; Mike d'Abo
- Past members: Benny Gallagher; Mike Vickers
- Website: http://www.themanfreds.com

The Manfreds is a British pop group, formed in 1991 as a reunion of former members of the 1960s pop group Manfred Mann, though without their eponymous founder Manfred Mann.

== History ==
The original members of Manfred Mann, minus keyboard player Mann, reformed in 1991 to celebrate guitarist Tom McGuinness's 50th birthday, and to promote a Manfred Mann compilation released around the same time. The absence of Mann forced them to adopt a different name. Original singer Paul Jones, and his late-1960s replacement Mike d'Abo were involved, along with other members of Manfred Mann from their 1960s heyday including keyboard player Mike Hugg, Tom McGuinness and Mike Vickers with drummer Rob Townsend and originally Benny Gallagher on bass guitar. They decided to continue the reunion, and in 1999 released the album 5-4-3-2-1 on the BMG sublabel Camden, described by Allmusic as "very close to their original sound, only a bit slicker". Live album L.I.V.E. followed in 2000. They went on to release further albums in 2000 and 2003. The group later included Marcus Cliffe (bass) and Simon Currie (flute and sax).

They continued to perform live, fitting it in between their other individual commitments, with Jones, McGuinness, and Townsend also members of The Blues Band, Jones also continuing his solo career and acting, radio and television work, Hugg and Cliffe performing as part of a jazz trio, and D'Abo presenting radio shows and performing with The New Amen Corner.

In 2013 they toured nationally to support a new Manfred Mann compilation, and did so again in 2014 and 2016, and in 2017 to promote their new album, Makin' Tracks, featuring both Jones and D'Abo on vocals, as well as performances in Ireland.

Mike Hugg retired from touring in 2022 and was replaced by Mike Gorman on keyboards.

Rob Townsend was advised not to undertake the 2023 Autumn 60th Anniversary tour on medical grounds and was replaced by Pete Riley on drums.

== Personnel ==
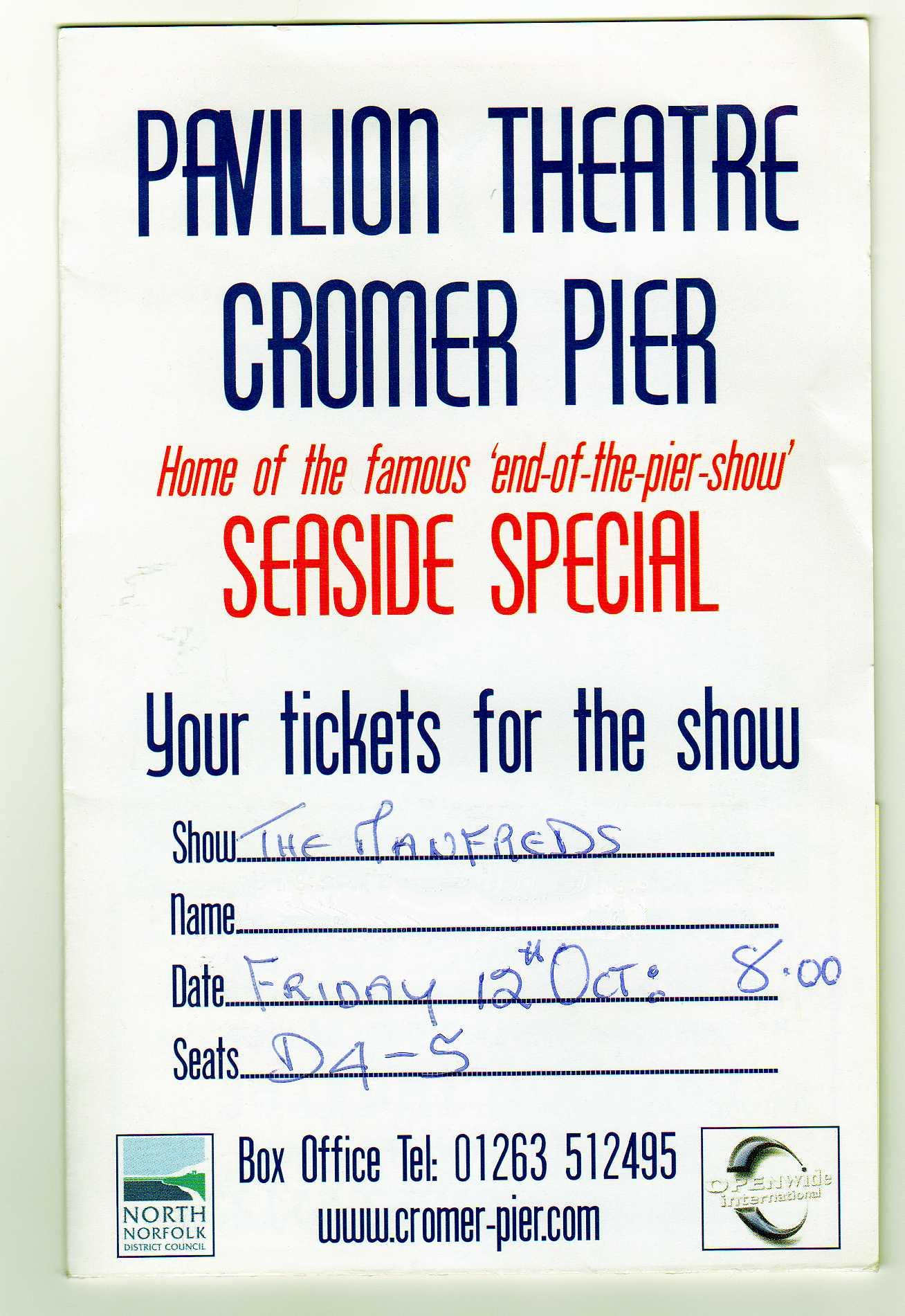
Ticket for the Pavilion Theatre on Cromer Pier, Show: The Manfreds.

Current members

Dates related to pre-2020 are taken from gig references on the British Newspaper Archive. Bold denotes members who were previously members of Manfred Mann

- **Paul Jones** – vocals, harmonica (Nov 1992–present)
- **Tom McGuinness** – guitar, backing vocals (Nov 1992–present)
- **Mike d'Abo** – vocals, keyboards (Nov 1992–present)
- Marcus Cliffe – bass guitar (Oct 2000–present)
- Simon Currie – saxophone, flute (May 2002–present)
- Mike Gorman - keyboards, vocals (Mar 2022–present)
- Pete Riley - drums (Sep 2023–present)

Former members

- Rob Townsend – drums, percussion (Nov 1992–Sep 2023)
- **Mike Hugg** – keyboards, percussion (Nov 1992–Nov 2021)
- **Mike Vickers** – saxophone, flute (Nov 1992–Nov 2000)
- Benny Gallagher – bass, backing vocals (Nov 1992–Dec 1999)

== Discography ==
| Year | Album | UK albums | US albums | Additional information |
|---|---|---|---|---|
| 1998 | 5-4-3-2-1 | - | - | Catalogue No. BMG CD 74321 566632. |
| 1999 | Live | - | - | Catalogue No. MANFREDS CD001. |
| 2000 | Maximum Manfreds | - | - | Catalogue No. MANFREDS CD002. |
| 2003 | Uncovered | - | - | Catalogue No. MANFREDS CD003. |
| 2014 | Let ‘em Roll | - | - | Catalogue No. MANFREDs CD004. |
| 2016 | Makin' Tracks | - | - | |
