= Odetta Sings Ballads and Blues =

Studio album by Odetta
- Released: November 1956
- Recorded: San Francisco, California, September 1956
- Genres: Folk, blues, vocal, calypso
- Length: 45:14 (reissue)
- Labels: Tradition; TLP 1010 (LP)
- Producer: Dean Gitter

Odetta chronology
The Tin Angel - Odetta & Larry (1954)	Odetta Sings Ballads and Blues (1956)	At the Gate of Horn (1957)

Original cover (1956)
- The vinyl cover of Ballads and Blues

Professional ratings
Review scores
Source	Rating
AllMusic	4.5/5 stars

Odetta Sings Ballads and Blues is the debut solo album by the American folk singer Odetta. It was released in November 1956 through Tradition Records.

Like much of Odetta's early work, Ballads and Blues combines traditional songs (e.g. spirituals) with blues covers. Some songs on this album were also recorded for Odetta & Larry's 1954 album The Tin Angel.

The initial vinyl release has tracks 1–8 as side A, then tracks 9–16 as side B (the "Spiritual Trilogy" being counted as one track, a medley). The "enhanced" CD version of this album, released in 2005, contains four bonus tracks and has a slightly different cover with a different photo of the singer. Some tracks are included on the Collectables re-release The Best of Odetta.

Bob Dylan singled this album out as one of his favorites by Odetta; indeed, it was albums like this that inspired him to play folk music instead of rock 'n' roll.

In 2021, the album was selected by the US Library of Congress for preservation in the National Recording Registry.

== Track listing ==
1. "Santy Anno" (Traditional) – 1:55
2. "If I Had a Ribbon Bow" (Huey Prince, Lou Singer) – 2:42
3. "Muleskinner Blues" (Jimmie Rodgers) – 2:51
4. "Another Man Done Gone" (Traditional) – 2:11
5. "Shame and Scandal" (Sir Lancelot) – 2:23
6. "Jack o' Diamonds" (Traditional) – 3:15
7. "'Buked and Scorned" (Traditional) – 2:40
8. "Easy Rider" (Traditional) – 5:06
9. "Joshua" (Traditional) – 1:53
10. "Hound Dog" (Traditional) – 3:50
11. "Glory, Glory" (Traditional) – 2:12
12. "Alabama Bound" (Huddie Ledbetter) – 1:42
13. "Been in the Pen" (Traditional) – 2:32
14. "Deep Blue Sea" (Traditional) – 3:00
15. "God's Gonna Cut You Down" (Traditional) – 1:51
16. Spiritual Trilogy: "Oh, Freedom", "Come and Go With Me", "I'm on My Way" (Traditional) – 6:06

=== 2005 CD bonus tracks ===
17. "He's Got the Whole World in His Hands" (Traditional) – 1:53
18. "Take This Hammer" (Ledbetter) – 3:27
19. "Deep River" (Traditional) – 3:00
20. "Chilly Winds" (Traditional) – 2:41

== Personnel ==
- Odetta Holmes – vocals, acoustic guitar, hand claps
