= Ed Bicknell =

British music manager and drummer (Born 1948)

- Born: 1948 (age 77–78); Yorkshire
- Occupations: Music manager and drummer Chairman of Hull University entertainment’s committee (1967-1969)
- Education: Tadcaster Grammar School

Ed Bicknell is a British music manager and drummer, best known for managing rock band Dire Straits, as well as Mark Knopfler, Gerry Rafferty, Bryan Ferry, Scott Walker and The Blue Nile.

== Career ==
Ed Bicknell (born 1948, Yorkshire) was Chairman of Hull University entertainment's committee from October 1967 to June 1969, when he first got a taste for the music industry. He also ran the folk and jazz and blues societies across the same period.

During that time he promoted shows by Jimi Hendrix, The Who, the Moody Blues, Muddy Waters, John Lee Hooker, Family, Ralph Mctell, Bert Jansch, The Kinks, Jethro Tull, John Mayall, Pink Floyd and numerous others.

== London ==
Moving to London, he played in several bands as drummer, and then became an agent at John Sherry Enterprises, and later NEMS, representing among others Wishbone Ash, Jose Feliciano, Deep Purple, Black Sabbath, Man, The Ramones, Talking Heads, Richie Havens and War.

Whilst working at NEMS in December 1977, Ed Bicknell received a call from Phonogram A&R man John Stainze who had just signed a new rock band, Dire Straits, formed in 1977 by guitarist Mark Knopfler, to the Vertigo label. In January 1978 Bicknell became their manager. Dire Straits would release six studio albums between 1978 and 1991. Bicknell was also the drummer of The Notting Hillbillies, a country group formed by Knopfler in 1989 whilst Dire Straits was on an extended hiatus. They recorded one album, Missing...Presumed Having a Good Time, which was released in March 1990, and toured the UK and performed two residencies at Ronnie Scott's Jazz Club in London before disbanding later that year. After Dire Straits disbanded permanently in 1995, Bicknell continued to manage Mark Knopfler as a solo artist for several years until 2000 when he stood down as Knopfler's manager on amicable terms.

In 1997, The Blue Nile appointed Ed Bicknell as a full-time manager for the first time in their career. He extricated the group from their deal with Warner Bros. He also attempted to persuade the band to change their recording habits, but had little success. Bicknell parted ways with the band in 2004, later stating that "in terms of the modern recording world the history of The Blue Nile was the most screwed-up I had ever encountered".

After two years as "Head of International Music" during which time he set up the music department, Bicknell left the London office of William Morris Endeavor in April 2010.

In recent years, he has often appeared on radio and television to discuss music industry issues and has carried out over 80 “interviews“ of leading music industry figures and artists at conferences and educational establishments.
