= Oh, Freedom =

African-American spiritual

"Oh, Freedom" is a post-Civil War African-American freedom song adapted from an African-American spiritual.

== History ==
The song had its roots in the spiritual "Before I'd Be a Slave," which had the central refrain:

O, what preachin'! O, what preachin'!
O, what preachin' over me, over me!
Before I'd be a slave, I'd be buried in my grave,
And go home to my Lord and be saved.

This was then repeated, with the first two lines changing with each repetition. The adapted song begins instead with "Oh freedom / Oh freedom / Oh freedom over me."

The song became affiliated with civil rights activism when it was used at protests of 1906 Atlanta race massacre. The song was first recorded in 1931 by the E. R. Nance Family as "Sweet Freedom". Writer and radio producer Richard Durham used it as an opening in his 1948–1950 radio anthology Destination Freedom.

The adapted song is often associated with the later Civil Rights Movement, with Odetta, who recorded it as part of the "Spiritual Trilogy", on her Odetta Sings Ballads and Blues album, and with Joan Baez, who performed the song at the 1963 March on Washington. Baez has since performed the song live numerous times, both during her concerts and at other events.

Some versions have included a verse beginning with "No more tommin'," where the verb tom is a derogatory term denoting some black men's extreme submissiveness towards a white person or white people. The word seems to have been derived from Harriet Beecher Stowe's fictitious character Uncle Tom in her 1852 novel Uncle Tom's Cabin. These verses were not part of the original composition, but instead added to the tradition of improvisation in African-American music. Some contemporary folk singers have changed the refrain to a more spirited perspective - "And before I'd be a slave, I'll bury you in your grave and send you home to the lord for free"

Similarly, during the 1964 presidential campaign, civil rights activists opposing the candidacy of Barry Goldwater changed the words to "And before I'd be a slave / I'll see Barry in his grave / And go fight for my rights and be free."

== See also ==
- Civil rights movement in popular culture
