= Missing...Presumed Having a Good Time =

Studio album by The Notting Hillbillies
- Released: 6 March 1990
- Recorded: 1989–1990
- Genres: Country rock, blues, Americana
- Length: 40:44
- Labels: Vertigo; Warner Bros. (US)
- Producers: Mark Knopfler; Guy Fletcher

Mark Knopfler chronology
Last Exit to Brooklyn (1989)	Missing... Presumed Having a Good Time (1990)	Neck and Neck (1990)

Missing...Presumed Having a Good Time is the only album by the Notting Hillbillies, released on 6 March 1990 by Vertigo Records internationally, and by Warner Bros. Records in North America.

== Critical reception ==
Professional ratings
Review scores
Source	Rating
AllMusic	4/5 stars

In his review for AllMusic, Tom Demalon called the album "a low-key, joyous run-through of mostly traditional, blues-based songs with a handful of originals." Demalon continued:

Despite the high-profile presence of Knopfler, the Notting Hillbillies succeed in sounding like a band with Knopfler often taking a backseat to his bandmates, although he does sing lead on the lovely "Your Own Sweet Way". The styles range from the gorgeous harmonies of "Railroad Worksong" with some mournful guitar from Knopfler, to the '50s-style rock ballad "Bewildered", to the breezy, tropical-flavored "One Way Gal".

Demalon concluded that Missing...Presumed Having a Good Time is a "delightful record that doesn't overstay its welcome."

== Track listing ==
No.	Title	Writer(s)	Length
1.	"Railroad Worksong"	Traditional; arranged by The Notting Hillbillies	5:29
2.	"Bewildered"	Leonard Whitcup, Teddy Powell	2:37
3.	"Your Own Sweet Way"	Mark Knopfler	4:32
4.	"Run Me Down"	Traditional; arranged by The Notting Hillbillies	2:25
5.	"One Way Gal"	Traditional; arranged by The Notting Hillbillies	3:10
6.	"Blues Stay Away from Me"	Alton Delmore, Rabon Delmore, Wayne Raney, Henry Glover	3:50
7.	"Will You Miss Me?"	Steve Phillips	3:52
8.	"Please, Baby"	Traditional; arranged by The Notting Hillbillies	3:50
9.	"Weapon of Prayer"	Ira Louvin, Charlie Louvin	3:10
10.	"That's Where I Belong"	Brendan Croker	2:51
11.	"Feel Like Going Home"	Charlie Rich	4:52

The song "Lonesome Wind Blues" is a non-album track that appears on two different European/UK CD & 12" singles: "Will You Miss Me" and "Feel Like Going Home".

== Personnel ==
Music

- Mark Knopfler – guitar, vocals
- Guy Fletcher – keyboards, vocals
- Brendan Croker – guitar, vocals
- Steve Phillips – guitar, vocals
- Paul Franklin – pedal steel guitar

Additional musicians

- Marcus Cliffe - bass
- Ed Bicknell - drums

Production

- Mark Knopfler – producer
- Guy Fletcher – producer
- Bill Schnee – mix engineer
- Brian Aris – photography
- * Ron Eve - Guitar wrangler/technician

== Charts ==
Chart (1990)	Peak position
Australian Albums (ARIA)	6
Austrian Albums (Ö3 Austria)	3
Canada (RPM Top 100)	29
Dutch Albums (Album Top 100)	13
German Albums (Offizielle Top 100)	6
New Zealand Albums (RMNZ)	4
Norwegian Albums (VG-lista)	2
Swedish Albums (Sverigetopplistan)	8
Swiss Albums (Schweizer Hitparade)	3
UK Albums (Official Charts)	2
US Billboard 200	52

== Certifications ==
Region	Certification	Certified units/sales
Australia (ARIA)	Gold	35,000^{^}
^{^} Shipments figures based on certification alone.
