= Hugh's Room =

Restaurant/music venue in Toronto

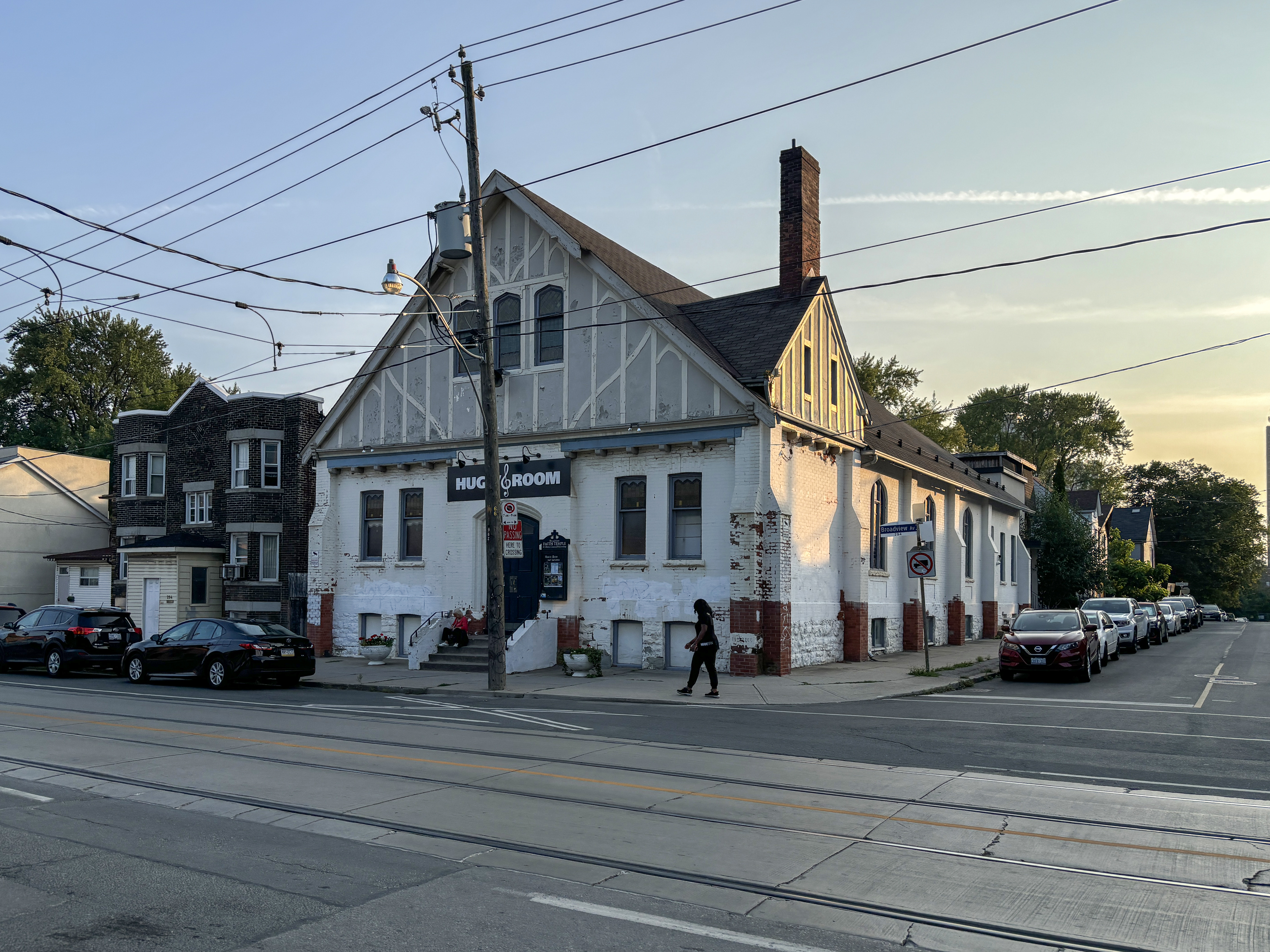
- Hugh's Room in 296 Broadview Avenue
- Interactive map of Hugh's Room
- Address: 296 Broadview Avenue; Toronto; Canada
- Location: Toronto, Ontario, Canada
- Coordinates: 43.654832°N 79.452202°W
- Seating type: theatre style
- Capacity: 200
- Type: Concert Hall
- Events: Folk, Jazz, World Music

Construction
- Built: 1894
- Opened: September 2023 (original venue April 2001)

Website
- hughsroom.com

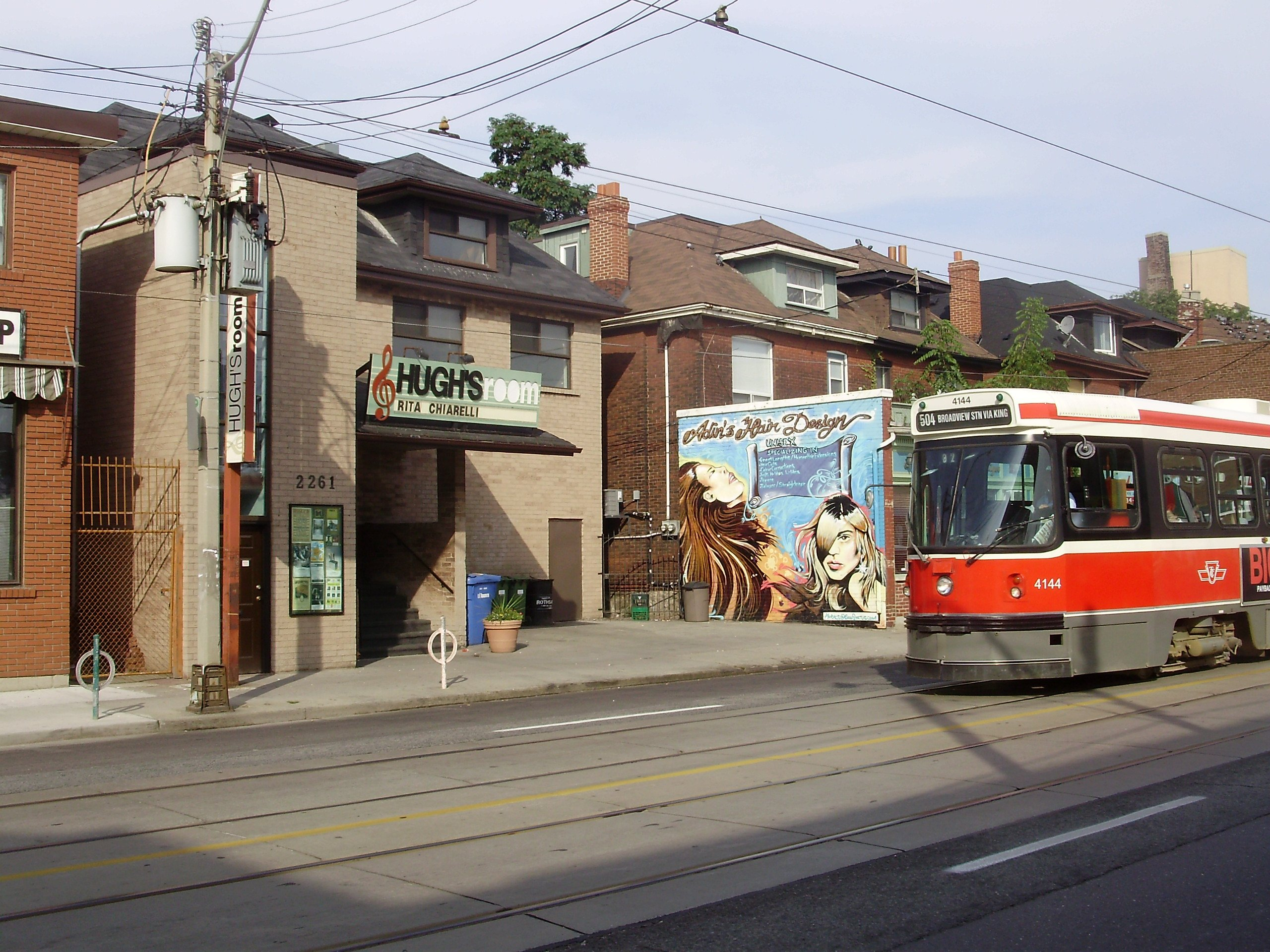
Original Hugh's Room (Dundas West) in September 2008

Hugh's Room is a live music venue in Toronto, Ontario, Canada. Formerly on Dundas Street West until 2020, as of July 2023 it has relocated to Broadview Avenue in the city's East Chinatown neighbourhood.

The club was opened in 2001 by Richard Carson and named in memory of his brother Hugh, a former folk musician who had dreamed of opening his own performance venue before his death of cancer in 1999.

Primarily a folk music club, Hugh's Room also sometimes booked jazz, blues, classical and comedy artists as well. Noted artists who have performed at the club include Pete Seeger, Serena Ryder, Sylvia Tyson, Odetta, Jane Siberry, Ron Sexsmith, Maria Muldaur and Richie Havens. Odetta's performance at the venue, on October 25, 2008, was her last live performance before her death on December 2 that year.

On January 8, 2017, Hugh's Room closed its doors for financial reasons. Several days later, a community committee announced plans to restructure the venue's accumulated debt and reopen. The club reopened in April 2017, following a successful fundraising initiative and the formation of a non-profit committee to manage the venue. The new corporation is called Hugh's Room Live.

In 2020, the Hugh's Room management announced that it was looking for a new building as it could not secure an affordable lease at the site it had been using.

After a lengthy effort and the support of over 1,000 individual donors, Hugh's Room secured its new home at 296 Broadview Avenue in the Riverdale/East Chinatown neighbourhood of the city's East End. In addition to operating as an independent and not-for-profit charitable music venue, Hugh's Room has plans to build their new larger facility into a community based music "hub" for the development of new talent in addition to its many legacy artists.
