= Odetta Sings Folk Songs =

1963 album

Studio album by Odetta
- Released: September 1963
- Studio: RCA Victor Studio A, New York City
- Genre: Folk, blues
- Label: RCA Victor
- Producer: Hugo & Luigi

Odetta chronology
One Grain of Sand (1963)	Odetta Sings Folk Songs (1963)	Odetta (1964)

Odetta Sings Folk Songs is a studio album by American folk singer Odetta, released on the RCA Victor label in September 1963. The album peaked at number 75 on the Billboard 200 chart. The album was nominated as the Best Folk Recording at the 6th Annual Grammy Awards.

== Track listing ==
1. "900 Miles" – 3:10
2. "Blowin' in the Wind" (Bob Dylan) – 4:09
3. "Maybe She Go" – 1:54
4. "I Never Will Marry" – 1:55
5. "Yes I See" – 2:53
6. "Why'n Oh Why" – 2:05
7. "Shenandoah" – 3:46
8. "The Golden Vanity" – 4:02
9. "Roberta" – 3:07
10. "Anthem of the Rainbow" (Forrest Tollis, Robert Cosbey, Jr.) – 4:07
11. "All My Trials" – 3:32
12. "This Little Light of Mine" (Harry Loes) – 3:03

== Personnel ==
- Odetta – vocals, guitar
- Bruce Langhorne – guitar
- Victor Sproles – bass

Technical

- Mickey Crofford – recording engineer

== Production notes ==
- Engineered by Mickey Crofford

== Charts ==
Chart performance for Odetta Sings Folk Songs
Chart (1963)	Peak position
US Billboard 200	75
