= The Best of Odetta =

Greatest hits album by Odetta
- Released: 1967
- Genre: Folk, blues
- Label: Tradition

Odetta chronology
Odetta (1967)	The Best of Odetta (1967)	Odetta Sings the Blues (1968)

The Best of Odetta is a compilation album by American folk singer Odetta, released in 1967.

== Track listing ==
1. "Muleskinner Blues" – 2:50
2. "If I Had a Ribbon Bow" – 2:50
3. "Shame and Scandal" – 2:25
4. "'Buked and Scorned" – 2:40
5. "Joshua" – 1:50
6. "He's Got the Whole World in His Hands" – 1:50
7. "Glory, Glory" – 2:10
8. "Lowlands" – 2:35
9. "The Fox" – 1:50
10. "Lass of the Low Countrie" – 4:30
11. "Devilish Mary" – 1:45
12. "Take This Hammer" – 3:32

== Personnel ==
- Odetta – vocals, guitar
- Bill Lee – bass
