= At the Gate of Horn =

Studio album by Odetta
- Released: October 1957
- Studios: Esoteric Studios, New York City
- Genres: Folk, blues
- Labels: Tradition, America
- Producer: Paul Klein (re-issue)

Odetta chronology
Odetta Sings Ballads and Blues (1956)	At the Gate of Horn (1957)	My Eyes Have Seen (1959)

Professional ratings
Review scores
Source	Rating
Allmusic	(no rating)

At the Gate of Horn is the second solo album by American folk singer Odetta, first released in October 1957. It was named for the Gate of Horn club in Chicago.

Odetta is joined by bassist Bill Lee. Although the title suggests it is a live recording, it is a studio recording, recorded at Esoteric Studios in New York City.

At the Gate of Horn was re-released on CD by Rykodisc in 1997 and by Empire Musicwerks in 2006. Some tracks are included on the Collectables re-release The Best of Odetta: Ballads and Blues.

== Track listing ==
All songs Traditional unless otherwise noted.

1. "He's Got the Whole World in His Hands" – 1:53
2. "Sail Away Ladies, Sail Away" – 2:22
3. "The Gallows Pole" – 2:52
4. "Lowlands" – 2:36
5. "The Fox" – 1:49
6. "Maybe She Go" (Delaplain) – 1:47
7. "The Lass from the Low Countree" (John Jacob Niles) – 4:33
8. "Timber" (Gary) – 3:11
9. "Deep River" – 3:00
10. "Chilly Winds" – 2:43
11. "Greensleeves" – 2:50
12. "Devilish Mary" – 1:52
13. "All the Pretty Little Horses" – 3:01
14. "The Midnight Special" (Huddie Ledbetter) – 2:36
15. "Take This Hammer" (Ledbetter) – 3:25

== Personnel ==
- Odetta Holmes – vocals, guitar
- Bill Lee – bass
