= The Notting Hillbillies =

British country-rock project

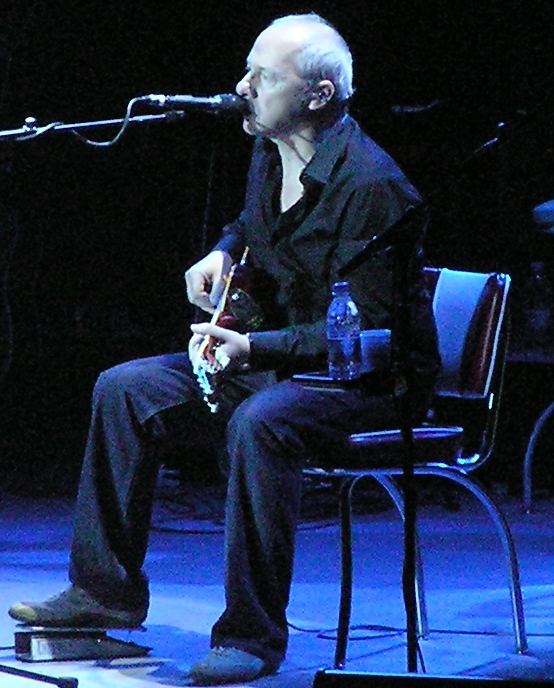
- Mark Knopfler performing in 2006

Background information
- Origin: London, England
- Genres: Country rock, blues, Americana
- Years active: 1986–1993, 1997, 2002
- Labels: Vertigo (UK); Warner Bros. (US)
- Past members: Mark Knopfler; Steve Phillips; Brendan Croker; Guy Fletcher; Paul Franklin; Marcus Cliffe; Ed Bicknell; Chris White

The Notting Hillbillies were a country rock project formed by British singer-songwriter Mark Knopfler in May 1986. The group consisted of Knopfler (guitar and vocals), Steve Phillips (guitar and vocals), Brendan Croker (guitar and vocals), Guy Fletcher (keyboards and vocals), Paul Franklin (pedal steel), Marcus Cliffe (bass), and Ed Bicknell (drums). They gave their first performance at a small club in Leeds, and followed up with a tour.

The Notting Hillbillies recorded just one album, Missing...Presumed Having a Good Time, released on Vertigo in the UK (Warner Bros. in the US, reaching #52 on the Billboard albums chart) in 1990, before members returned to concentrate on their primary musical outlets. Three tracks from the album – "Your Own Sweet Way", "Feel Like Going Home" and "Will You Miss Me" – were released as singles; some versions of these included "Lonesome Wind Blues", a track not on the album. The Notting Hillbillies reunited several times for charity gigs. In May 1997 the Hillbillies went on an 11 show tour in the UK.

The Town & Country Club in Leeds on 3 July 1993 only featured the Knopfler-Croker-Philips trio. The set list included the only known live performances of two Dire Straits songs : "Ticket To Heaven" and "How Long". The Notting Hillbillies had previously performed "When It Comes to You" in 1990, before it was actually recorded and issued by Dire Straits on their final album On Every Street, in 1991. At the height of their fame, the Notting Hillbillies were the musical guest on the 19 May 1990 episode of Saturday Night Live, hosted by Candice Bergen.

The concert at The City Hall in Newcastle on 6 July 1993 featured Alan Clark on keyboards, his only appearance with the band. Ed Bicknell and Marcus Cliffe were also present. This was the last time that Clark played with Knopfler within a full band.

In 1993, two shows were performed, both without Guy Fletcher.

Band member Brendan Croker died due to complications from leukaemia on 10 September 2023, at the age of 70.

== Band line-up members ==
- Mark Knopfler – vocals, guitar (1986–1993, 1997, 2002)
- Steve Phillips – vocals, guitar (1986–1993, 1997, 2002)
- Brendan Croker – guitar, vocals (1986–1993, 1997, 2002; died 2023)
- Guy Fletcher – keyboards, vocals (1986–1993, 1997, 2002)
- Marcus Cliffe – bass (1986–1993, 1997, 2002)
- Ed Bicknell – drums (1986–1993, 1997)
- Paul Franklin – pedal steel guitar (1989–1990)
- Chris White - saxophone (1990)
- Alan Clark – keyboards (one-off in 1993)
- Danny Cummings – drums (2002)

== Discography ==
=== Studio albums ===
List of albums, with selected details and chart positions
Title	Album details	Peak chart positions			Certification
Title	Album details	UK	AUS	Canada	Certification
Missing...Presumed Having a Good Time	Released: 1990; Format: LP, CD, cassette; Label: Vertigo	2	6	29	ARIA: Gold

=== Singles ===
List of singles with selected chart positions
Title	Year	Peak chart positions				Album
Title	Year	UK	AUS	Canada	Canada AC	Album
"Your Own Sweet Way"	1990	76	28	50	13	Missing... Presumed Having a Good Time
"Feel Like Going Home"	1990	—	—	—	—	Missing... Presumed Having a Good Time
"Will You Miss Me"	1990	—	—	—	—	Missing... Presumed Having a Good Time
