= Get Up, Stand Up: The Story of Pop and Politics =

2003 documentary TV-series

Get Up, Stand Up: The Story of Pop and Politics is a 6x60 minutes documentary TV-series about the relationship between singers and politics in the US, the UK, Germany and France from the 1960s until 2003. It was made in 2003 by Rudi Dolezal, Hannes Rossacher and Simon Witter as a joint production between German ZDF and the French-German culture channel Arte. It has since been shown by a number of other broadcasters in Europe, but also by Australia's ABC.

The series features interviews and archive footages with well known singers and songwriters including Joan Baez, Tom Paxton, Bono, David Bowie, Johnny Cash, Daniel Cohn-Bendit, Bob Dylan, Ice-T, Bob Geldof, Willie Nelson, Roger Waters, Bruce Springsteen, Pete Seeger, Neil Young, Jimi Hendrix, Marlene Dietrich, Franz Josef Degenhardt. Materials sind in 3 languages: German, Englisch and French.

A much shorter, two-hour version, called Get Up, Stand Up: The Story of Pop and Protest, aired on PBS in September 2005, hosted and narrated by co-founder of Public Enemy Chuck D. The PBS version focuses mainly on the American history of protest songs.

The title is borrowed from the reggae protest song Get Up, Stand Up by Bob Marley and Peter Tosh.

== Episodes ==
- Part 1: We Shall Overcome - An introductory overview
- Part 2: Next Stop is Vietnam - The music of the Vietnam War peace movement in the 1960s
- Part 3: Fight the Power - Protest music in the 1970s and the 1980s
- Part 4: Say it Loud - An overview of politics in black music, from Paul Robeson to Ms Dynamite
- Part 5: We Are The World - the big aid concerts of the 1990s
- Part 6: What's Going On - In the new millennium, musicians like Bono and Bob Geldof become political lobbyists
