= To Ella =

To Ella a.k.a. Odetta (Silverwolf album) & American Folk Music Pioneer

Live album by Odetta
- Released: October 6, 1998; April 8, 2003; June 3, 2003
- Recorded: Kerrville Folk Festival, late 1990s
- Genre: Folk, Blues
- Length: 36:58
- Label: Silverwolf 1012 (To Ella); Silverwolf 1038 (Odetta)
- Producer: Murray Krugman

Odetta chronology
The Best of Odetta: Ballads and Blues (1994)	To Ella a.k.a. Odetta (Silverwolf album) & American Folk Music Pioneer (1998)	Blues Everywhere I Go (1999)

Alternative album covers
- Odetta (Silverwolf album) (2003)

Alternative cover
- American Folk Pioneer (2003)

To Ella is an album by American folk singer Odetta, released 1998 on Silverwolf Records. Recorded live at the Kerrville Folk Festival, it features traditional songs including "Amazing Grace" and a 27-minute "Ancestors Suite" containing several songs.

The album is dedicated to the memory of jazz singer Ella Fitzgerald, who died in 1996 (although it does not contain any Ella Fitzgerald songs).

The album was re-released twice in 2003, and, confusingly, the CDs had two different names: Odetta (also on Silverwolf Records) and American Folk Pioneer (American Legends).

Professional ratings
Review scores
Source	Rating
Allmusic	4/5 stars

== Track listing ==
All songs Traditional unless otherwise noted.

1. "Black Woman" – 3:10
2. "The Fox" – 2:44
3. Suite: Ancestors: – 27:55
  1. "900 Miles"
  2. "Red Clay Country"
  3. "Another Man Done Gone" (Vera Hall, Alan Lomax, John Lomax, Ruby Pickens Tartt)
  4. "No More Cane on the Brazos"
  5. "Pretty Horses"
  6. "Poor Wayfarin' Stranger"
  7. "900 Miles (Reprise)"
  8. "Shenandoah"
  9. "Can't Keep from Cryin'"
  10. "Trouble"
4. "Ol' Lady Sally" – 1:03
5. "Amazing Grace" (John Newton) – 2:06

== Personnel ==
- Odetta – vocals, Guitar
