= Take This Hammer =

Folk song

"Take This Hammer" (Roud 4299, AFS 745B1) is a prison, logging, and railroad work song, which has the same Roud number as another song, "Nine Pound Hammer", with which it shares verses. "Swannanoa Tunnel" and "Asheville Junction" are similar. Together, this group of songs are referred to as "hammer songs" or "roll songs" (after a group of wheelbarrow-hauling songs with much the same structure, though not mentioning hammers). Numerous bluegrass bands and singers like Scott McGill and Mississippi John Hurt also recorded commercial versions of this song, nearly all of them containing verses about the legendary railroad worker, John Henry; and even when they do not, writes folklorist Kip Lornell, "one feels his strong and valorous presence in the song".

== Background ==
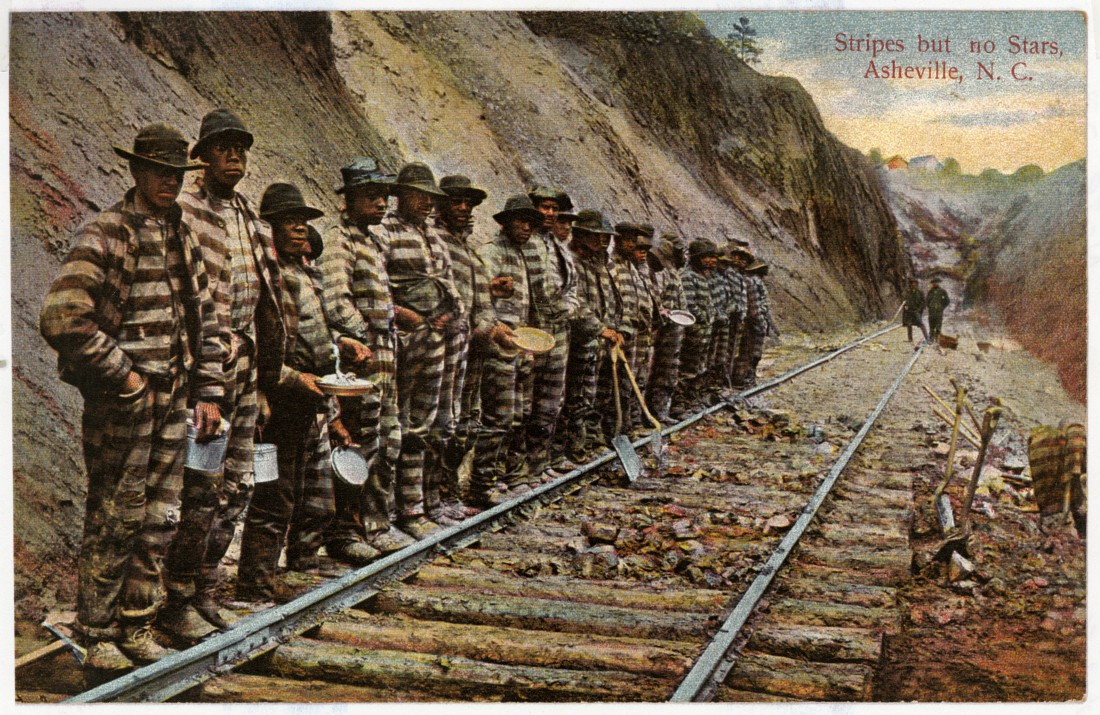
Convicts leased to build a railroad in Asheville, North Carolina, 1892

For almost a hundred years after the abolition of slavery, convicts, mostly African-American, were leased to work as forced labor in the mines, railroad camps, brickyards, turpentine farms, and then on road gangs of the American South. Forced labor on chain gangs, levees, and huge, plantation-like prison farms continued well into the twentieth century. It was not unusual for work songs like "Take this Hammer" and its "floating verses" to drift between occupations along with the itinerant laborers who sang them. The elements of both the ballad of "John Henry" and the "Take This Hammer" complex appear to date from the late nineteenth century, probably the 1870s.

== Early versions ==
A manuscript variant of "Take This Hammer" from 1915 was published by the folklorist and English professor Newman Ivey White:

This old hammer killed John Henry,
But it can't kill me.
Take this hammer, take it to the Captain,
Tell him I'm gone, babe, tell him I'm gone.

In the 1920s, folklorists, notably Dorothy Scarborough (1925) and Guy Johnson and Howard W. Odum (1926), also collected transcribed versions. Scarborough's short text, published in her book, On The Trail of Negro Folk-Songs (1925), is the first version published under the title "Nine-Pound Hammer", before the earliest commercial recording of that name. This was the white "hillbilly" (as country music was then called) 78 single by Al Hopkins and His Buckle Busters. Hopkins's "Nine Pound Hammer" added the chorus "Roll on buddy / Don't you roll so slow. / How can I roll / When the wheels won't go?" This was the first of many hillbilly recordings of the song, including The Monroe Brothers' "Nine Pound Hammer Is Too Heavy", in 1936. Carl Sandburg's popular anthology, The American Songbag (1927) contains the song "My Old Hammah" ("Shine like silver"). In 1928, before the Depression put an end to his recording career, African-American blues singer Mississippi John Hurt issued a commercial single, "Spike Driver Blues" on Okeh records. This song, with intricate finger-picked guitar accompaniment, combines some elements of the "John Henry" ballad. It was later included in Harry Smith's celebrated 1952 Anthology of American Folk Music LP set, leading to the rediscovery of the performer. Norm Cohen terms "Spike Driver Blues" "a lyrical variant of "Nine-Pound Hammer" and "more an entertainment piece than an actual work song, but their close kinship is unmistakable".

== Field recordings ==
In 1933 John A. Lomax and his 18-year-old son Alan, recording for the Library of Congress with the aid of an aluminum flat-disc-cutting recording machine, recorded Allen Prothro, a prisoner in Chattanooga, Tennessee, singing "Jumpin' Judy", with a theme and verses in common with "Take This Hammer", including reference to the "captain" (i.e., white prison guard), with his .44 in his right hand, and the fantasy of escape. They printed a longer version of the text in their anthology American Ballads and Folk Songs (1934), stipulating that it be performed "rather slow, with pathos."

John A. Lomax and his colleague Harold Spivacke made another Library of Congress audio field recording on June 14, 1936, of "Take This Hammer", performed by Jimmie Strothers, a blind prisoner at the State Farm (Virginia State Penitentiary), at Lynn, Virginia, performing with finger-picked banjo accompaniment.

In 1942, Alan Lomax recorded another version of the same song as sung by Sid Hemphill. This version was titled "John Henry" and accompanied by violin, played by Hemphill, and a drum, played by a friend of Hemphill, Will Head.

In December 1947, Alan Lomax recorded it again on (then newly invented) reel-to-reel tape at Lambert Camp, Parchman Farm (Mississippi State Penitentiary), performed by three prisoners with axes: "Bull" Hollie Dew, "Foots" Milton Smith, and "Dobie Red" Tim Taylor.

In 1959, Alan Lomax and English singer Shirley Collins revisited Parchman Farm in Mississippi, bringing along with them reel-to-reel stereo equipment. Among other songs, they re-recorded "Take This Hammer", performed by L. C. Hoskins and an unidentified group of prisoners cutting wood with axes As late as 1965, folklorist Bruce Jackson, while doing field work in the Texas prison system, collected it from prisoners who sang it (also while cutting lumber), as "This Old Hammer Killed John Henry".

== Commercial recordings after 1940 ==
"Take This Hammer" was issued on a commercial 78-rpm single by Lead Belly in 1940 and again in 1942. In his performance on this record, Lead Belly added a "haah" at the end of each line, explaining in his spoken introduction, "Every time the men say 'haah', the hammer falls. The hammer rings, and we swing, and we sing." In saying "we", Lead Belly was undoubtedly referring to his many years as an inmate of the notorious prison farm in Angola, Louisiana. Lead Belly's powerful version subsequently became a staple of the urban folk revival. Folksong performer and music historian Odetta recorded a similar version, incorporating Lead Belly's "haah", in 1957.

Meanwhile, the song continued to be popular among country singers. Merle Travis's 1946 recomposition, "Nine Pound Hammer is Too Heavy", an adaptation of the song to coal mining, had a great impact on folk and country singers.

== Notable recordings ==
- The Beatles on Get Back 'Camera B' Rolls vol 11 (recorded 1969) (also on Thirty Days)
- The Beau Brummels as "Nine Pound Hammer" on their LP Triangle
- Big Bill Broonzy on the DVD The Story of the Blues (2003)
- Brothers Four (on the Columbia LP Sing of Our Times; reissued on CBS LP Starportrait)
- Johnny Cash on Blood, Sweat and Tears (1963) under the title "Nine Pound Hammer"
- Sanford Clark, 1956 recording as "Nine Pound Hammer" (Dot 15534)
- Ken Colyer (1955, Decca Single F10631, b/w "Down By The Riverside")
- Charley Crockett on the album, The Valley (2019), under the title "9 LB Hammer" (also on the Ourvinyl Sessions EP)
- Delmore Brothers as "Take It To The Captain" (King 718-B, 1948)
- Drafi Deutscher & His Magics, 1965 German version "Ich Will Frei Sein", reissued on the Bear Family CD Drafi Deutscher: Die Decca Jahre Teil 3
- Lonnie Donegan on Lonnie Rides Again (1959)
- The Felice Brothers on Tonight at the Arizona (2007)
- Foggy Mountain Boys (Flatt and Scruggs) on Folk Songs of our Land (1962)
- The Greenbriar Boys on Ragged But Right! (1964)
- John Fahey on The Voice of The Turtle (1968) under the title "Nine-Pound Hammer"
- Jesse Fuller
- Mississippi John Hurt
- Clifford Jordan
- Lead Belly (on a single recorded in 1942)
- John Lennon, Paul McCartney, Linda McCartney, Stevie Wonder on A Toot and a Snore in '74 1974 - bootleg recording: These are bootlegs (see Day by Day)
- Harry Manx on Road Ragas (2004) and Harry Manx & Friends Live at the Glenn Gould Studio (2008)
- Monroe Brothers as "Nine Pound Hammer is Too Heavy" (1936), also on Feast Here Tonight (1975)
- MV&EE "Hammer" on LP Gettin Gone (2007)
- The New Christy Minstrels on Presenting and In Person (2003)
- Nitty Gritty Dirt Band feat. Merle Travis as "Nine Pound Hammer" from their 3-LP set Will the Circle Be Unbroken
- Notting Hillbillies on Missing...Presumed Having a Good Time (1990) under the title "Railroad Worksong"
- Odetta on Odetta at the Gate of Horn (1957)
- Osborne Brothers on Voices in Bluegrass (c 1970)
- Our Gang (The Rattles and friends), reissued on the Bear Family CD Die Hamburg Szene
- John Prine (as "Nine Pound Hammer") on Sweet Revenge
- Carl Stokes, former Cleveland, Ohio mayor, on his spoken word and jazz album, The Mayor and His People (Flying Dutchman)
- The Shadows as "This Hammer": B-side of single "Theme for Young Lovers" (1964)
- Sonny Terry & Brownie McGhee on their LP Blues & Shouts (America Records 6075)
- Spencer Davis Group as "The Hammer Song" on their second LP The Second Album (Feb '66)
- Mark Selby as "Nine Pound Hammer" on his LP Nine Pound Hammer
- Ton Steine Scherben as "Nimm den Hammer" on Wenn die Nacht am tiefsten… (1975)
- Troublemakers as "Race Records" on their second LP Express Way (2004)
- Merle Travis
- Townes Van Zandt
- Jimmy Witherspoon on Live in London (recorded 1966)
- Taj Mahal and Toumani Diabate on their album Kulanjan
- Long John Baldry on Remembering Leadbelly (2001)
- Cat Stevens as "Tell 'em I'm Gone" (from the CD/LP Tell 'em I'm Gone) (Legacy, 2014)
- Ralph Stanley as "Nine Pound Hammer" on Short Life of Trouble: Songs of Grayson and Whitter (1996)
- Kimber's Men as "Take this Hammer/Please your Captain" on The Strength of the Swell, the lead vocals on this song are shared between Joe Stead on the first half, and Gareth Scott on the second.
- Willie Watson

== Other uses ==
- The lyrics to the first verse are visible in the liner notes of Brand New's The Devil and God Are Raging Inside Me album.
- An award-winning documentary film by Bob Gordon about the building of dry stack stone walls entitled, Take This Hammer (released in September 2008), has a soundtrack featuring the traditional "Nine Pound Hammer" song, which is in the public domain.
