= Raphael Grinage =

American musician and composer (1931–1993)

- Born: Les Grinage; 4 January 1931; Cleveland, Ohio, United States
- Died: 15 December 1993 (aged 62); Oakland, California, United States
- Other name: Rafiudin
- Occupations: musician, composer
- Years active: 1950–1993
- Spouse: Rashidah Grinage

Raphael Grinage was an American jazz and folk musician and composer.

== Early life ==
Raphael Grinage (a.k.a. Les Grinage) was born in Cleveland, Ohio on January 4, 1931, the third of four sons. His father, Jose, was an African-American Methodist Episcopal (AME) minister, and his mother, Lathrope Tull, taught piano. His family moved to Kentucky when he was a teenager, and from there, after graduating high school, Raphael joined the Army and was sent to Korea. Upon his discharge, he moved to New York City to pursue a career in music. He had already participated in bands during high school, and decided to become a professional bassist. His formal music training was obtained at the Manhattan School of Music.

== Music career ==
As a bassist, Grinage accompanied many of the jazz greats of the era such as vocalist Carmen McRae and legendary pianist Bill Evans, among others. He increased his versatility by playing cello and learning to play the Japanese Koto and the Dilruba (a bowed version of the Indian sitar).

In the 50s, he was a member of the musicians who accompanied the Alvin Ailey Company, and joined them in several international visits, on behalf of the US State Department. In the 1960s, he joined folksinger Odetta, and accompanied her for over five years, travelling around the world. It was while he was in Japan with Odetta that he met the woman he would marry, and that decision changed his life’s trajectory.

Returning to the United States in 1969, Raphael joined with Hamilton Camp and two other musicians to form the group, The True Brethren. The four composed the music for Paul Sills' Story Theatre, which previewed at Mark Taper Forum in Los Angeles. Later it was taken to Broadway where it played for a year before it went on tour and became the basis of a TV series. The show was nominated for best Broadway show of the year in 1971. Grinage also played and composed music for the Broadway Show, Paul Sills adaptation of Ovid's Metamorphoses.

Grinage played at many Bay Area venues, including the musical based on the famous song "Stompin' at the Savoy", which ran in San Francisco for several months. He also played with many Bay Area musicians, including Earl Hines.

In 2012 four live recordings of the True Brethren from 1969 were released for the first time by one of the members of the original group. In these rare recordings, Grinage plays two of the instruments he spent a lifetime playing: the cello and dilruba.

== Personal life ==
Raphael fathered four sons. His career was impacted by his having become a double amputee as a result of diabetes. On December 15, 1993, at Raphael's home in Oakland, California, the Oakland police animal control attempted to quarantine his son Luke's pitbull, which had bitten 3 people and was behind on rabies vaccinations.

After a brief conversation and Luke's initial resistance to surrendering his dog, he finally agreed to get the dog. But scuffling with OPD ensued and eventually, Luke obtained a shotgun and killed Officer William Grijalva. Two other officers on scene returned fire which killed Luke. Raphael was caught in the crossfire in his wheel chair as well as Luke's dog.
