= Brendan Croker =

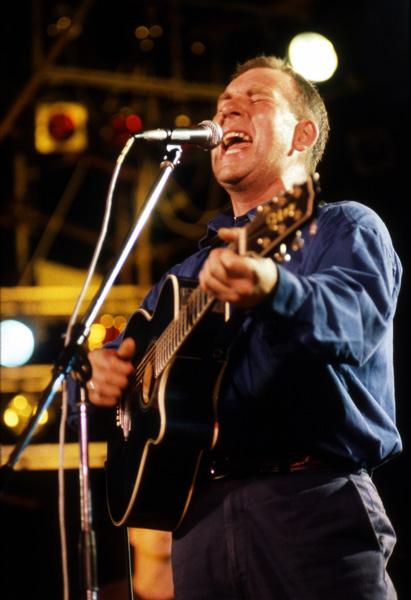
- Croker performing in 1989

Background information
- Born: 15 August 1953; Bradford, Yorkshire, England
- Died: 10 September 2023 (aged 70)
- Occupation(s): Musician; Songwriter
- Formerly of: The Mekons, The Notting Hillbillies, Sally Timms
- Website: http://www.brendancroker.com/

Brendan Christopher Croker (15 August 1953 – 10 September 2023) was an English musician, who recorded albums under his own name and with an occasional backing band, The Five O'Clock Shadows.

== Early life ==
Croker was born in Bradford, Yorkshire, on 15 August 1953. His father Michael was a warehouseman and former army sergeant; his mother Eileen was a mill worker. His mother told him that when he was two he could sing the whole of the Doris Day song "The Deadwood Stage". After graduating from Bradford College of Art, Croker had various jobs including dustbin man in Sheffield, railway guard in Leeds, and at the Yorkshire Electricity Board. He was working as a painter at Leeds Playhouse when he met set designer Ali Allen, who became his lifelong partner.

== Musical career ==
Croker began his musical career playing small venues in Leeds with Mark Knopfler, who was studying for a degree at Leeds University, and guitarist Steve Phillips, who joined them in the 1990s in The Notting Hillbillies. Broadcaster Andy Kershaw saw Croker playing country blues with Knopfler and Phillips in a pub near Leeds University; he described him as "a world-class songwriter and a tremendous singer, a kind of British Ry Cooder", and commented that he sounded like "someone from Muscle Shoals, Alabama, rather than Headingly, Leeds". The Five O'Clock Shadows were beginning to achieve serious recognition when Croker dissolved the group and moved to Nashville, where he worked with Chet Atkins. His former manager said Croker "felt the whole idea of being a guitar hero was slightly absurd". He later returned to England and released solo albums, including one entitled "Redneck State of the Art". Croker recorded with Eric Clapton, Tanita Tikaram, Mark Knopfler, Kevin Coyne, and Chet Atkins. During the late 1980s he was an auxiliary member of The Mekons and a full-time member of Sally Timms and the Drifting Cowgirls.

In the early 2000s Croker was based in Leeds and playing small venues with one-man shows. In 2001 he recorded an album called "Life is Almost Wonderful" with painter and singer Kevin Coyne, the two having met in a hotel breakfast lounge in Bruges. In the later years of his life Croker performed in venues in Leeds and Belgium and one of his final solo shows was called "Dying to Sing", in which he performed songs by dead artists such as Kurt Cobain and Bob Marley. He said he was fascinated by such characters "because they made other people's lives better, often at the expense of their own".

== Death ==
Brendan Croker died from complications caused by leukaemia on 10 September 2023, at the age of 70.

== Albums ==
With the 5 O'Clock Shadows

- Central Station Hotel (1985)
- A Close Shave (1986)
- Boat Trips in the Bay (1987)
- Live at the Front Page: The Official Bootleg (1987)
- Brendan Croker and The 5 O'Clock Shadows (1989)

With Guy Fletcher

- On The Big Hill (1988)

With The Notting Hillbillies

- Missing...Presumed Having a Good Time (1990)

With the Serious Offenders

- Time Off (1992)
- Made in Europe (1993)

With Kevin Coyne

- Life Is Almost Wonderful (2002)

As a solo artist

- Country Blues Guitar (1990)
- The Great Indoors (1991)
- Redneck State of The Art (1995)
- The Kershaw Sessions (1995)
- Three Chord Lovesongs (1996)
- Not Just A Hillbilly... More Like a Best of Brendan Croker (2000)
