= Odetta =

American singer (1930–2008)

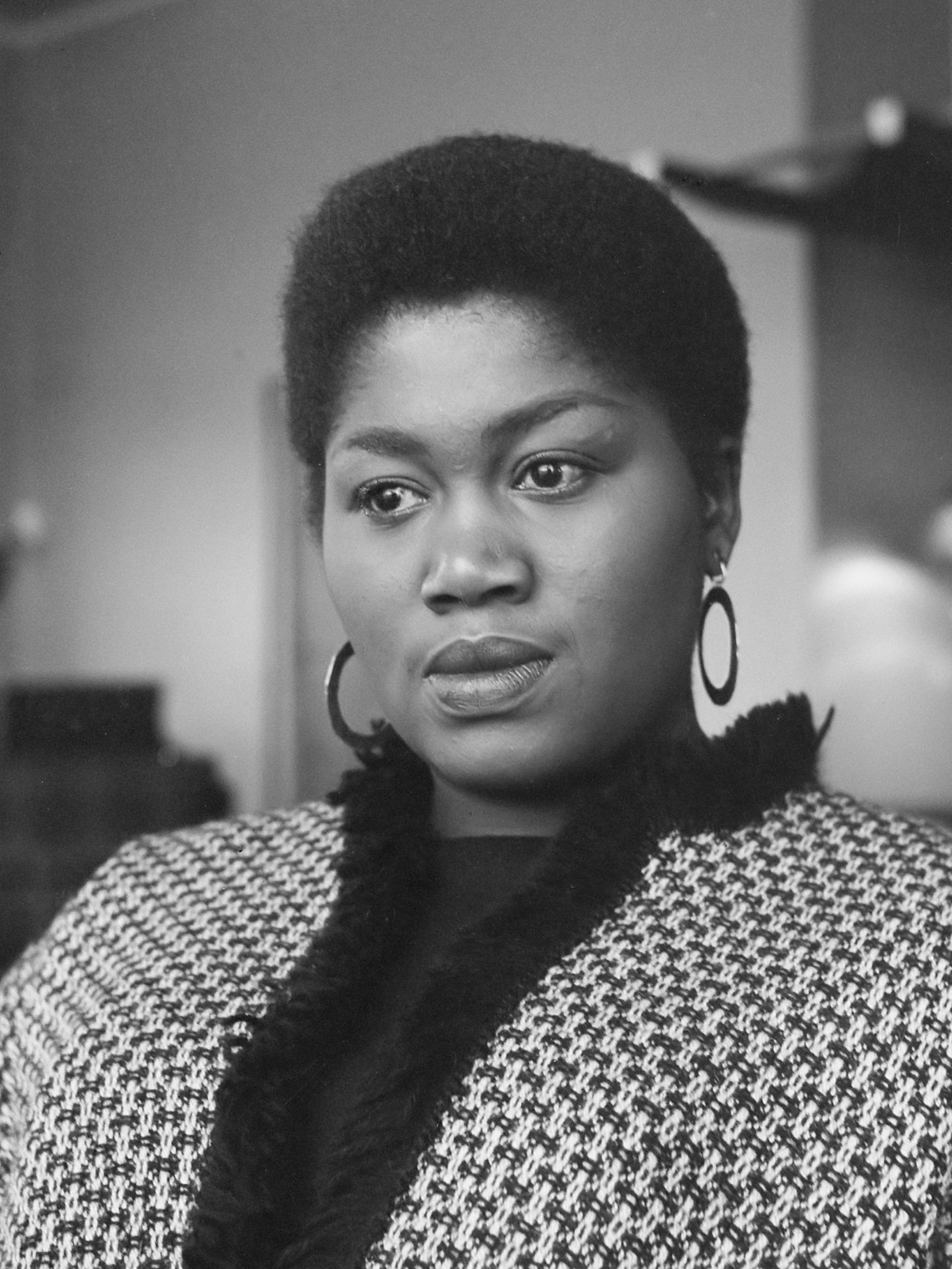
- Odetta in 1961

Background information
- Also known as: Odetta Gordon, Odetta Felious
- Born: Odetta Holmes; December 31, 1930; Birmingham, Alabama, U.S.
- Died: December 2, 2008 (aged 77) New York City, U.S.
- Genres: Folk; blues; spirituals
- Occupations: Singer; songwriter; actress; activist
- Years active: 1944–2008
- Labels: Fantasy; Tradition; Vanguard; RCA Victor; MC; Silverwolf; Original Blues Classics
- Spouse(s): Don Gordon (m. 1959; div. 1959); Iverson Minter (m. 1977; div. 1983)

Odetta Holmes (December 31, 1930 – December 2, 2008), known mononymously as Odetta, was an American singer, songwriter, and actress. Referred to as "The Voice of the Civil Rights Movement", her musical repertoire consisted largely of American folk music, blues, jazz, and spirituals.

An important figure in the American folk music revival of the 1950s and 1960s, she influenced many of the key figures of the folk-revival of that time, including Bob Dylan, Joan Baez, Mavis Staples, and Janis Joplin. In 2011 Time magazine included her recording of "Take This Hammer" on its list of the 100 Greatest Popular Songs, stating that "Rosa Parks was her No. 1 fan, and Martin Luther King Jr. called her the queen of American folk music."

== Biography ==
=== Early life and career ===
Odetta was born Odetta Holmes in Birmingham, Alabama. Her father, Reuben Holmes, died when she was young, and in 1937 she and her mother, Flora Sanders, moved to Los Angeles. When Flora remarried a man called Zadock Felious, Odetta took her stepfather's last name. In 1940 Odetta's teacher noticed her vocal talents, "A teacher told my mother that I had a voice, that maybe I should study," she recalled. "But I myself didn't have anything to measure it by." She began operatic training at the age of thirteen. After attending Belmont High School, she studied music at Los Angeles City College supporting herself as a domestic worker. Flora had hoped to see her daughter follow in the footsteps of Marian Anderson, but Odetta doubted a large black girl like herself would ever perform at the Metropolitan Opera. In 1944 she made her professional debut in musical theater as an ensemble member for four years with the Hollywood Turnabout Puppet Theatre, working alongside Elsa Lanchester. In 1949, she joined the national touring company of the musical Finian's Rainbow.

While on tour with Finian's Rainbow, Odetta "fell in with an enthusiastic group of young balladeers in San Francisco", and after 1950 she concentrated on folk singing.

She made her name playing at the Blue Angel nightclub in New York City, and the hungry i in San Francisco. At Tin Angel also in San Francisco in 1953 and 1954, Odetta recorded the album Odetta and Larry with Larry Mohr for Fantasy Records.

A solo career followed, with Odetta Sings Ballads and Blues (1956) and At the Gate of Horn (1957). Odetta Sings Folk Songs was one of the best-selling folk albums of 1963.

In 1959 she appeared on Tonight with Belafonte, a nationally televised special. She sang "Water Boy" and a duet with Belafonte, "There's a Hole in My Bucket".

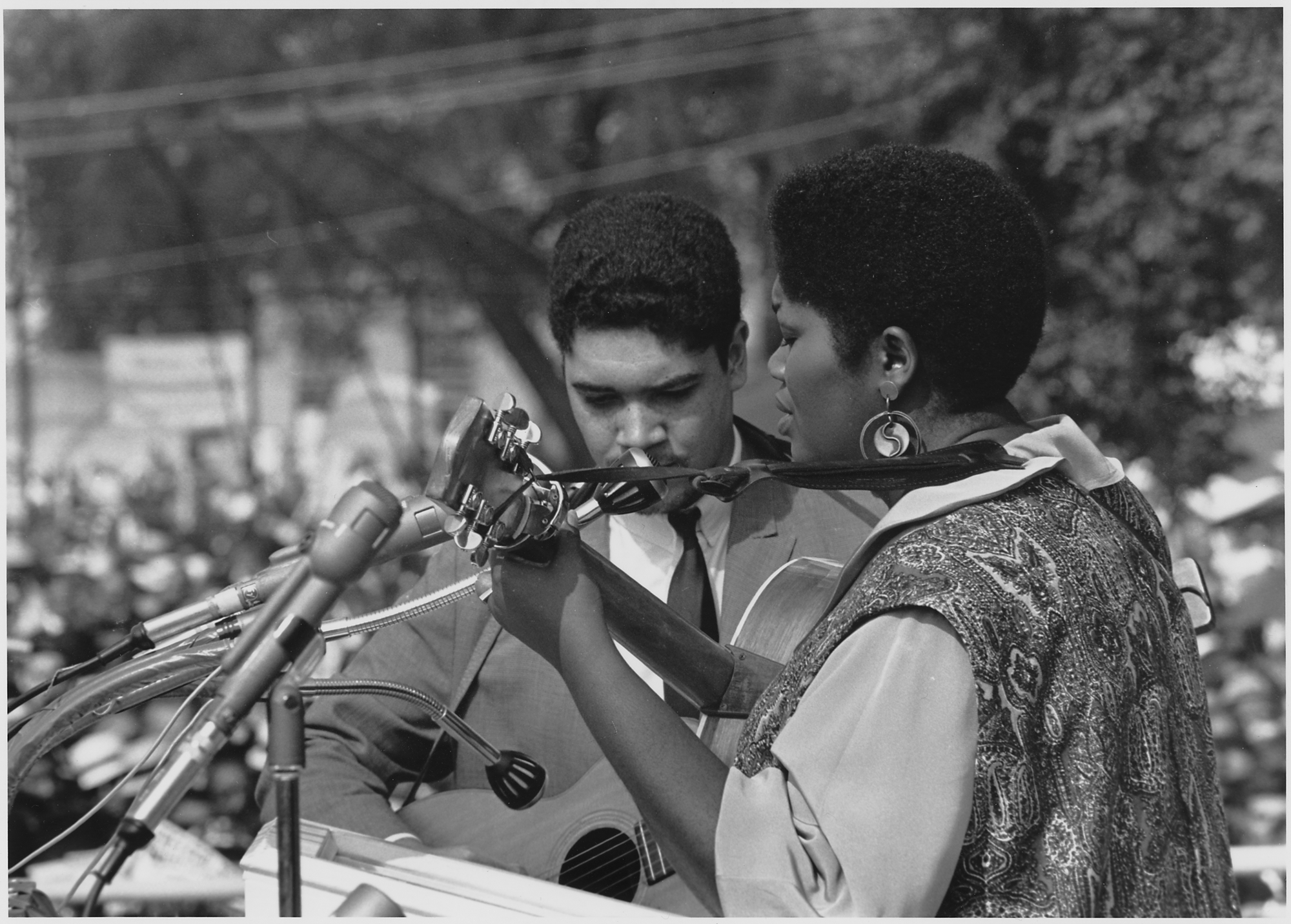
Civil Rights March on Washington, D.C. (Entertainment, Vocalist Odetta.) - NARA - 542020

In 1961, Martin Luther King Jr. called her "The Queen of American Folk Music". Also in 1961, the duo Harry Belafonte and Odetta made number 32 in the UK Singles Chart with the song "There's a Hole in the Bucket".

She is remembered for her performance at March on Washington, the 1963 civil rights demonstration, at which she sang "O Freedom". She described her role in the civil rights movement as "one of the privates in a very big army".

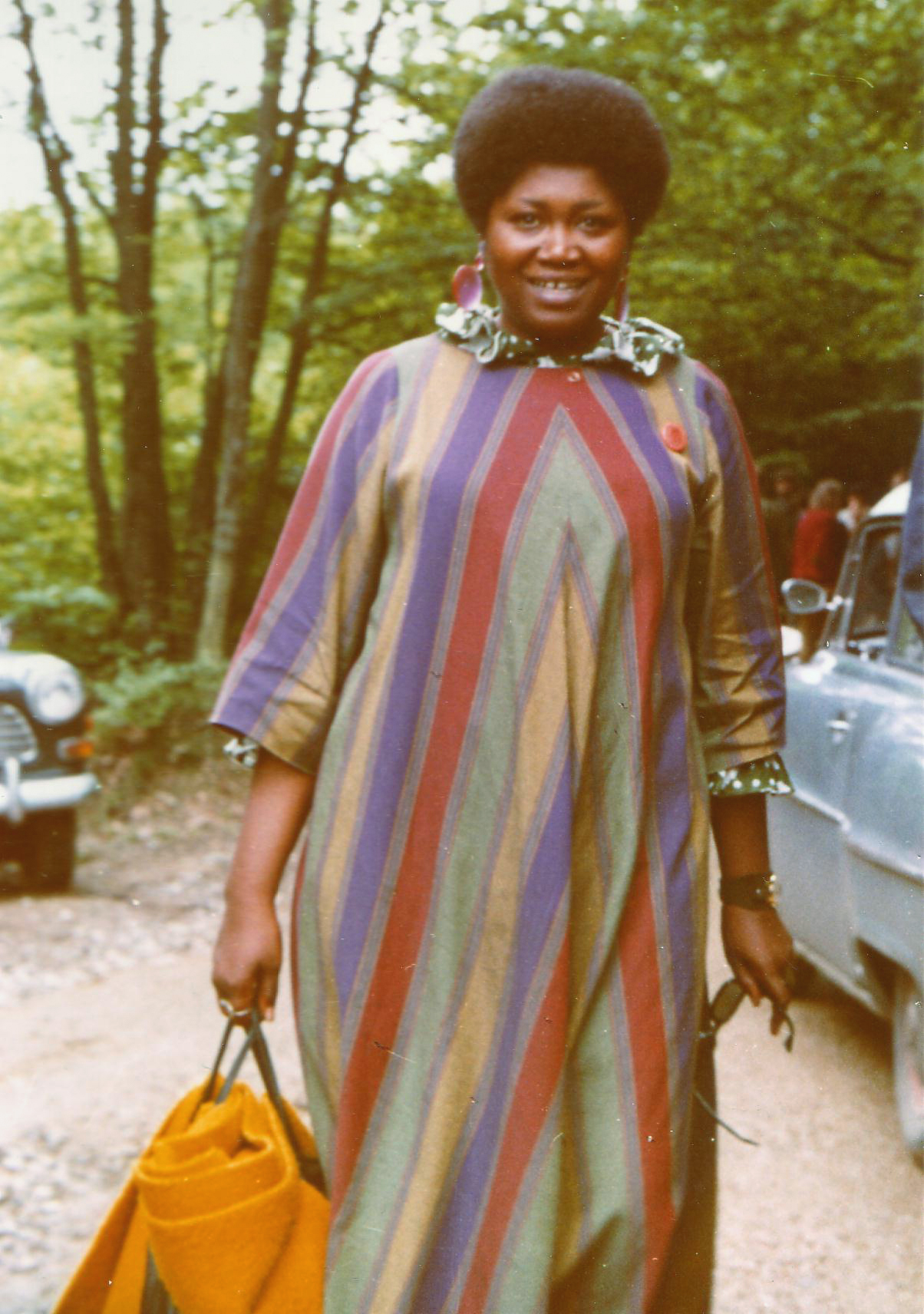
Odetta at the Burg Waldeck-Festival, West Germany, 1968

Broadening her musical scope, Odetta used band arrangements on several albums rather than playing alone. She released music of a more "jazz" style on albums like Odetta and the Blues (1962) and Odetta (1967). She gave a remarkable performance in 1968 at the Woody Guthrie memorial concert.

Odetta acted in several films during this period, including Cinerama Holiday (1955); a cinematic production of William Faulkner's Sanctuary (1961); and The Autobiography of Miss Jane Pittman (1974). In 1961 she appeared in an episode of the TV series Have Gun, Will Travel, playing the wife of a man sentenced to hang ("The Hanging of Aaron Gibbs").

She was married twice, first to Dan Gordon and then, after their divorce, to blues singer-guitarist Iverson Minter, known as Louisiana Red. Her second marriage also ended in divorce. She was also engaged (but not married) to Garry Shead.

=== Later career ===
In May 1975 she appeared on public television's Say Brother program, performing "Give Me Your Hand" in the studio. She spoke about her spirituality, the music tradition from which she drew, and her involvement in civil rights struggles.

In 1976, Odetta performed in the U.S. Bicentennial opera Be Glad Then, America by John La Montaine, as the Muse for America; with Donald Gramm, Richard Lewis and the Penn State University Choir and the Pittsburgh Symphony. The production was directed by Sarah Caldwell who was the director of the Opera Company of Boston at the time.

In 1982, Odetta was an artist-in-residence at the Evergreen State College in Olympia, Washington.

Odetta released two albums in the 20-year period from 1977 to 1997: Movin' It On, in 1987 and a new version of Christmas Spirituals, produced by Rachel Faro, in 1988.

Beginning in 1998, she returned to recording and touring. The new album To Ella (recorded live and dedicated to her friend Ella Fitzgerald upon hearing of her death before walking on stage), was released in 1998 on Silverwolf Records, followed by three releases on M.C. Records in partnership with pianist/arranger/producer Seth Farber and record producer Mark Carpentieri. These included Blues Everywhere I Go, a 2000 Grammy-nominated blues/jazz band tribute album to the great lady blues singers of the 1920s and 1930s; Looking for a Home, a 2002 W.C. Handy Award-nominated band tribute to Lead Belly; and the 2007 Grammy-nominated Gonna Let It Shine, a live album of gospel and spiritual songs supported by Seth Farber and The Holmes Brothers. These recordings and active touring led to guest appearance on fourteen new albums by other artists between 1999 and 2006 and the re-release of 45 old Odetta albums and compilation appearances.

On September 29, 1999, President Bill Clinton presented Odetta with the National Endowment for the Arts' National Medal of Arts. In 2004, Odetta was honored at the Kennedy Center with the "Visionary Award" along with a tribute performance by Tracy Chapman. In 2005, the Library of Congress honored her with its "Living Legend Award".

In mid-September 2001, Odetta performed with the Boys' Choir of Harlem on the Late Show with David Letterman, appearing on the first show after Letterman resumed broadcasting, having been off the air for several nights following the events of September 11; they performed "This Little Light of Mine".

The 2005 documentary film No Direction Home, directed by Martin Scorsese, highlights her musical influence on Bob Dylan, the subject of the documentary. The film contains an archive clip of Odetta performing "Waterboy" on TV in 1959, as well as her "Mule Skinner Blues" and "No More Auction Block for Me".

In 2006, Odetta opened shows for jazz vocalist Madeleine Peyroux, and in 2006 she toured the U.S., Canada, and Europe accompanied by her pianist, which included being presented by the U.S. Embassy in Latvia as the keynote speaker at a human rights conference, and also in a concert in Riga's historic 1,000-year-old Maza Guild Hall. In December 2006, the Winnipeg Folk Festival honored Odetta with their "Lifetime Achievement Award". In February 2007, the International Folk Alliance awarded Odetta as "Traditional Folk Artist of the Year".

On March 24, 2007, a tribute concert to Odetta was presented at the Rachel Schlesinger Theatre by the World Folk Music Association with live performance and video tributes by Pete Seeger, Madeleine Peyroux, Harry Belafonte, Janis Ian, Sweet Honey in the Rock, Josh White Jr., Peter, Paul and Mary, Oscar Brand, Tom Rush, Jesse Winchester, Eric Andersen, Wavy Gravy, David Amram, Roger McGuinn, Robert Sims, Carolyn Hester, Donal Leace, Marie Knight, Side by Side, and Laura McGhee.

In 2007, Odetta's album Gonna Let It Shine was nominated for a Grammy, and she completed a major Fall Concert Tour in the "Songs of Spirit" show, which included artists from all over the world. She toured around North America in late 2006 and early 2007 to support this album.

=== Final tour ===
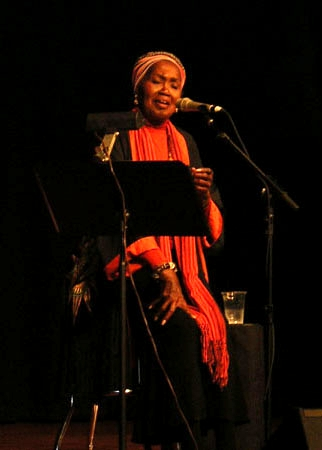
Odetta performing in 2006

On January 21, 2008, Odetta was the keynote speaker at San Diego's Martin Luther King Jr. commemoration, followed by concert performances in San Diego, Santa Barbara, Santa Monica, and Mill Valley, in addition to being the sole guest for the evening on PBS-TV's The Tavis Smiley Show.

Odetta was honored on May 8, 2008, at a historic tribute night, hosted by Wavy Gravy, held at Banjo Jim's in the East Village. Included in the billing that night were David Amram, Vincent Cross, Guy Davis, Timothy Hill, Jack Landron, Christine Lavin, Madeleine Peyroux and Chaney Sims.

In summer 2008, at the age of 77, she launched a North American tour during which she sang from a wheelchair. Her set in later years included "This Little Light of Mine (I'm Gonna Let It Shine)", Lead Belly's "The Bourgeois Blues", "(Something Inside) So Strong", "Sometimes I Feel Like a Motherless Child" and "House of the Rising Sun".

She made an appearance on June 30, 2008, at The Bitter End on Bleecker Street, in New York City for a concert in tribute to Liam Clancy. Her last big concert, before thousands of people, was in San Francisco's Golden Gate Park on October 4, 2008, for the Hardly Strictly Bluegrass Festival. Her last performance was at Hugh's Room in Toronto on October 25.

=== Death ===
In November 2008, Odetta's health began to decline and she began receiving treatment at Lenox Hill Hospital in New York. She had hoped to perform at Barack Obama's inauguration on January 20, 2009, but she died of heart disease in New York City on December 2, 2008, at the age of 77.

At a memorial service for her in February 2009 at Riverside Church in New York City, participants included Maya Angelou, Pete Seeger, Harry Belafonte, Geoffrey Holder, Steve Earle, Sweet Honey in the Rock, Peter Yarrow, Maria Muldaur, Tom Chapin, Josh White Jr. (son of Josh White), Emory Joseph, Rattlesnake Annie, the Brooklyn Technical High School Chamber Chorus, and videotaped tributes from Tavis Smiley and Joan Baez.

== Legacy ==
Odetta influenced Harry Belafonte, who "cited her as a key influence" on his musical career; Bob Dylan, who said, "The first thing that turned me on to folk singing was Odetta. I heard a record of hers in a record store, back when you could listen to records right there in the store. That was in '58 or something like that. Right then and there, I went out and traded my electric guitar and amplifier for an acoustical guitar, a flat-top Gibson.... [That album was] just something vital and personal. I learned all the songs on that record"; Joan Baez, who said, "Odetta was a goddess. Her passion moved me. I learned everything she sang"; Janis Joplin "spent much of her adolescence listening to Odetta, who was also the first person Janis imitated when she started singing"; the poet Maya Angelou, who once said, "If only one could be sure that every 50 years a voice and a soul like Odetta's would come along, the centuries would pass so quickly and painlessly we would hardly recognize time"; John Waters, whose original screenplay for Hairspray mentions her as an influence on beatniks; and Carly Simon, who cited Odetta as a major influence and told of "going weak in the knees" when she had the opportunity to meet her in Greenwich Village.

In 2023, Rolling Stone ranked Odetta at number 171 on its list of the 200 Greatest Singers of All Time. She became a 2024 inductee to the Blues Hall of Fame.

== Filmography ==
Film/programme title	Info	Year
Cinerama Holiday	Film	1955
Lamp Unto My Feet	TV	1956
Tonight with Belafonte	TV musical variety (Emmy Award)	1959
The Ford Show Starring Tennessee Ernie Ford		March 10, 1960
Toast of the Town	TV	1960
Sanctuary	Dramatic film	1961
Have Gun—Will Travel episode 159/226: "The Hanging of Aaron Gibbs"	TV drama	1961
Les Crane Show	TV talk, variety	1965
Tennessee Ernie Ford Show	TV talk, variety	1965
Festival	Film documentary	1967
Live from the Bitter End	TV concert	1967
Clown Town starring Odetta & Bobby Vinton	NBC-TV music special	1968
The Dick Cavett Show	TV talk, variety	1969
The Johnny Cash Show	TV musical variety	1969
Sesame Street	Episode 117	1970
The Virginia Graham Show	TV	1971
The Autobiography of Miss Jane Pittman	TV film	1974
Soundstage: Just Folks with Odetta, Tom Paxton, Josh White Jr. and Bob Gibson	TV concert special	1980
Ramblin': With Odetta	TV concert special	1981
Chords of Fame	Film documentary	1984
Macy's Thanksgiving Day Parade		1989
Boston Pops with Odetta, Shirley Verrett and Boys Choir of Harlem	TV concert	1991
Tommy Makem & Friends	TV concert	1992
The Fire Next Time	TV film	1993
Turnabout: The Story of the Yale Puppeteers	Film documentary	1993
Odetta: Woman In (E)motion	German TV concert special	1995
Peter, Paul and Mary: Lifelines	TV	1996
National Medal of Arts and Humanities Presentations	TV (C-SPAN)	1999
The Ballad of Ramblin' Jack	Drama	2000
21st Annual W.C. Handy Blues Awards	Awards ceremony	2000
Songs for a Better World	TV concert special	2000
Later... with Jools Holland with Odetta and Bill Wyman & His Rhythm Kings	BBC-TV	2001
Politically Incorrect with Bill Maher	TV talk show	2001
Late Show with David Letterman	TV talk show, variety	2001
Pure Oxygen	TV talk show	2002
Newport Folk Festival	TV concert special	2002
Janis Joplin: Pieces of My Heart	BBC-TV biography special	2002
Get Up, Stand Up: The Story of Pop and Protest	Film documentary	2003
Tennessee Ernie Ford Show	TV musical variety, rebroadcast	2003
Ralph Bunche: An American Odyssey	PBS-TV biography	2003
Brother Outsider: The Life of Bayard Rustin	PBS-TV biography	2003
Visionary Awards Presentation	PBS-TV award presentation	2004
Lightning in a Bottle – Salute to the Blues	Film documentary	2004
No Direction Home	Film documentary	2005
Talking Bob Dylan Blues	BBC-TV concert special	2005
Odetta: Blues Diva	PBS-TV concert special	2005
Odetta: Viss Notiek	Latvian TV Weekly Journal	2006
A Tribute to the Teachers of America	PBS-TV special: Concert at Town Hall, New York City; Odetta sings a medley of the children's songs "Rock Island Line", "Here We Go Looptie-Lou", "Bring Me Little Water Sylvie"	2007
The Tavis Smiley Show	PBS-TV discussion, performance of "Keep on Movin' It On"	January 25, 2008
Mountain Stage HD: John Hammond, Odetta, and Jorma Kaukonen	PBS-TV concert special	2008
Odetta Remembers	BBC Four interview and concert footage	February 6, 2009
The Yellow Bittern	Film biography of Liam Clancy, of the Clancy Brothers	2009

== See also ==
- James Chaney
