= Richard Davis discography =

This is the discography for American jazz musician Richard Davis.

== As leader/co-leader ==
- 1967: Heavy Sounds with Elvin Jones (Impulse!, 1968)
- 1969: Muses for Richard Davis (MPS, 1970)
- 1971: The Philosophy of the Spiritual (Cobblestone, 1971) - also released as With Understanding (Muse, 1971)
- 1972: Epistrophy & Now's The Time (Muse, 1972)
- 1972: Epistrophy & Now's the Time (Muse, 1972)
- 1973: Dealin' (Muse, 1974)
- 1973?: Song for Wounded Knee (Flying Dutchman, 1973)
- 1975: As One (Muse, 1976)
- 1977: Harvest (Muse, 1979)
- 1977: Way Out West (Muse, 1980)
- 1977: Fancy Free (Galaxy, 1977)
- 1977: Divine Gemini with Walt Dickerson (SteepleChase, 1978)
- 1977: Tenderness with Walt Dickerson (SteepleChase, 1985)
- 1979: Cauldron (Corvo, 1979)
- 1987: Persia My Dear (DIW, 1987)
- 1989: One for Frederick (Hep, 1990)
- 1989: Body and Soul with Archie Shepp (Enja, 1991)
- 1990: I Remember Clifford (DIW, 1990)
- 1990: Dealin' (Live At Sweet Basil) (Sweet Basil, 1991)
- 1994?: Reminisces (Sympatico, 1994)
- 1997: Total Package (Marge, 1998)
- 1999: The Bassist: Homage to Diversity (King, 2001)
- 2001: So in Love (King, 2002)
- 2007: Madison with Tine Asmundsen, Vidar Johansen, Robert Shy (Hazel Jazz, 2008)
- 2007: Blue Monk (King, 2008)

== As a member ==
New York Unit

- Now's The Time (Bellaphon, 1992)
- Over The Rainbow (King, 1993) – rec. 1992
- Tribute To George Adams (King, 1993) – rec. 1992

The Great Jazz Trio (With Hank Jones, piano, and Elvin Jones, drums)

- Someday My Prince Will Come (Eighty-Eight's, 2002)
- Autumn Leaves (Eighty-Eight's, 2003)
- Collaboration (Eighty-Eight's, 2004)

=== As sideman ===
With Manny Albam

- Brass on Fire (Sold State, 1966)
- The Soul of the City (Solid State, 1966)

With Charles Brown

- Boss of the Blues (Mainstream, 1963)
- Ballads My Way (Mainstream, 1965)

With Ray Bryant

- Lonesome Traveler (Cadet, 1966)
- Slow Freight (Cadet, 1967)

With Jaki Byard

- Freedom Together! (Prestige, 1966)
- Jaki Byard with Strings! (Prestige, 1968)
- The Jaki Byard Experience (Prestige, 1968)

With Creative Construction Company

- Creative Construction Company (Muse, 1975)
- Creative Construction Company Vol. II (Muse, 1976)

With Eric Dolphy

- Iron Man (Douglas, 1963)
- Out to Lunch! (Blue Note, 1964)

With Lou Donaldson

- Rough House Blues (Argo, 1964)
- Sophisticated Lou (Blue Note, 1973)

With Booker Ervin

- The Freedom Book (Prestige, 1963)
- The Song Book (Prestige, 1964)
- The Blues Book (Prestige, 1964)
- The Space Book (Prestige, 1965)
- Groovin' High (Prestige, 1966)
- Heavy!!! (Prestige, 1967)

With The Free Design

- Heaven/Earth (Project, 1969)
- Stars/Time/Bubbles/Love (Project, 1970)

With Stan Getz

- Stan Getz Plays Music from the Soundtrack of Mickey One (MGM, 1965)
- Stan Getz & Bill Evans with Bill Evans (Verve, 1973)

With Chico Hamilton

- The Further Adventures of El Chico (Impulse!, 1966)
- The Dealer (Impulse!, 1966)

With Joe Henderson

- In 'n Out (Blue Note, 1964)
- Relaxin' at Camarillo (Contemporary, 1979)

With Andrew Hill

- Black Fire (Blue Note, 1963)
- Smokestack (Blue Note, 1963)
- Judgment! (Blue Note, 1964)
- Point of Departure (Blue Note, 1964)
- Andrew!!! (Blue Note, 1964)
- Pax (Blue Note, 1965)
- Lift Every Voice (Blue Note, 1969)
- Nefertiti (East Wind, 1976)

With Johnny Hodges

- Blue Rabbit (Verve, 1964) with Wild Bill Davis
- Wings & Things (Verve, 1965) with Wild Bill Davis
- Stride Right (Verve, 1966) with Earl "Fatha" Hines

With Janis Ian

- Stars (Columbia, 1974)
- Aftertones (Columbia, 1975)
- Between the Lines (Columbia, 1975)
- Janis Ian (Columbia, 1978)
- Billie's Bones (Rude Girl, 2004)

With Milt Jackson

- For Someone I Love (Riverside, 1963)
- Jazz 'n' Samba (Impulse!, 1964)

With Budd Johnson

- Ya! Ya! (Argo, 1964)
- Off the Wall (Argo, 1964) with Joe Newman

With J. J. Johnson

- J.J.'s Broadway (Verve, 1963)
- Goodies (RCA Victor, 1965)
- Broadway Express (RCA Victor, 1965)
- Israel (CTI, 1968) with Kai Winding

With Elvin Jones

- Dear John C. (Impulse!, 1965)
- Heavy Sounds (Impulse!, 1967)
- Very R.A.R.E. (Trio, 1979)
- Heart to Heart (Denon, 1980)
- Love & Peace (Trio, 1982)
- Elvin Jones Jazz Machine Live at Pit Inn (Polydor Japan, 1984)

With Hank Jones

- Arigato (Progressive, 1976)
- Ain't Misbehavin' (Galaxy, 1978)

With The Thad Jones/Mel Lewis Orchestra

- Presenting Thad Jones/Mel Lewis and the Jazz Orchestra (Sold State, 1966)
- Live at the Village Vanguard (Solid State, 1967)
- Monday Night (Solid State, 1968)
- Basle, 1969 (TCB, 1969) (Released 1996)
- Central Park North (Solid State, 1969)
- Consummation (Blue Note, 1970)

With Clifford Jordan

- These are My Roots: Clifford Jordan Plays Leadbelly (Atlantic, 1965)
- In the World (Strata-East, 1972) – rec. 1969
- Inward Fire (Muse, 1978)
- Four Play (DIW, 1990) with James Williams and Ronnie Burrage

With Roland Kirk

- Reeds & Deeds (Mercury, 1963)
- Rip, Rig and Panic (Limelight, 1965)

With Eric Kloss

- Grits & Gravy (Prestige, 1966)
- In the Land of the Giants (Prestige, 1969)

With Hubert Laws

- The Laws of Jazz (Atlantic, 1964)
- Flute By-Laws (Atlantic, 1966)
- Wild Flower (Atlantic, 1972)

With John Lewis

- Essence (Atlantic, 1962)
- P.O.V. (Columbia, 1975)

With Herbie Mann

- Impressions of the Middle East (Atlantic, 1966)
- The Herbie Mann String Album (Atlantic, 1967)

With Pat Martino

- Baiyina (The Clear Evidence) (Prestige, 1968)
- The Visit! (Cobblestone, 1972) also released as Footprints
- Exit (Muse, 1976)

With Brother Jack McDuff

- Prelude (Prestige, 1963)
- Moon Rappin' (Blue Note, 1969)
- Check This Out (Cadet, 1972)

With Gary McFarland

- The Gary McFarland Orchestra with Bill Evans (1963)
- Soft Samba (Verve, 1963)
- The In Sound (Verve, 1965)

With Jimmy McGriff

- The Big Band (Solid State, 1966)
- A Bag Full of Blues (Solid State, 1967)
- Groove Grease (Groove Merchant, 1971)

With Melanie

- Stoneground Words (Neighborhood, 1972)
- As I See It Now (Neighborhood, 1975)

With Helen Merrill

- The Feeling Is Mutual (Millestone, 1967)
- John Lewis/Helen Merrill (Mercury, 1977)

With Wes Montgomery

- California Dreaming (Verve, 1966)
- Road Song (A&M, 1968)

With David Murray

- The Hill (Black Saint, 1987)
- Seasons (Pow Wow, 1999)

With Oliver Nelson

- More Blues and the Abstract Truth (Impulse!, 1964)
- Oliver Nelson Plays Michelle (Impulse!, 1966)

With David "Fathead" Newman

- Bigger & Better (Atlantic, 1968)
- The Many Facets of David Newman (Atlantic, 1969)

With New York Unit

- Oleo (CBS, 1989)
- Blue Bossa (Paddle Wheel, 1990)
- St. Thomas: Tribute to Great Tenors (Paddle Wheel, 1991)
- Tribute to George Adams (Paddle Wheel, 1991)
- Now's the Time (Paddle Wheel, 1992)
- Over the Rainbow (Paddle Wheel, 1992)
- Akari (Apollon, 1994)

With Laura Nyro

- Christmas and the Beads of Sweat (Columbia, 1970)
- Smile (Columbia, 1976)

With The Rascals

- Once Upon a Dream (Atlantic, 1968)
- Freedom Suite (Atlantic, 1969)

With Shirley Scott

- Latin Shadows (Impulse!, 1965)
- Roll 'Em: Shirley Scott Plays the Big Bands (Impulse!, 1966)
- Mystical Lady (Cadet, 1971)

With Jimmy Smith

- Monster (Verve, 1965)
- Hoochie Coochie Man (Verve, 1966)
- Jimmy & Wes: The Dynamic Duo with Wes Montgomery (Verve, 1966)
- Further Adventures of Jimmy and Wes with Wes Montgomery (Verve, 1966)

With Chris Smither

- I'm a Stranger Too! (Tomato, 1970)
- Honeysuckle Dog (Okra-Tone, 2005)

With Bruce Springsteen

- Greetings from Asbury Park, N.J. (Columbia, 1973)
- Born to Run (Columbia, 1975)

With Sonny Stitt

- Mr. Bojangles (Cadet, 1973)
- Satan (Cadet, 1974)
- Stomp Off Let's Go (Flying Dutchman, 1976)

With Leon Thomas

- Spirits Known and Unknown (Flying Dutchman, 1969)
- Full Circle (Flying Dutchman, 1973)

With Cal Tjader

- Soul Sauce (Verve, 1965)
- Soul Bird: Whiffenpoof (Verve, 1965)
- Soul Burst (Verve, 1966)

With Loudon Wainwright III

- Album III (Columbia, 1972)
- T Shirt (Arista, 1976)

With Ben Webster

- Soulmates (Riverside, 1963) also with Joe Zawinul
- See You at the Fair (Impulse!, 1964)

With Phil Woods

- Round Trip (Verve, 1969)
- Musique du Bois (Muse, 1974)

With others

- Peter Allen, Tenterfield Saddler (Metromedia, 1972)
- Louis Armstrong, Louis Armstrong and His Friends (Flying Dutchman, 1970)
- Dorothy Ashby, The Fantastic Jazz Harp of Dorothy Ashby (Atlantic, 1965)
- Tine Asmundsen, Madison (Hazel Jazz, 2008)
- Elek Bacsik, I Love You (Bob Thiele Music, 1974)
- Chet Baker, Baker's Holiday (Limelight, 1965)
- Gary Bartz, Libra (Milestone, 1968)
- Tony Bennett, I've Gotta Be Me (Columbia, 1969)
- George Benson, Shape of Things to Come (A&M, 1968)
- Willie Bobo, Spanish Grease (Verve, 1965)
- Teresa Brewer, Singin' A Doo-Dah Song (Flying Dutchman, 1972)
- Ruth Brown, Ruth Brown '65 (Mainstream, 1965)
- Buffalo Springfield, Last Time Around (Atco, 1968)
- Kenny Burrell, A Night at the Vanguard (Argo, 1959)
- Free Creek, Music from Free Creek (Buddah, 1973)
- Candido Camero, Beautiful (Blue Note, 1970)
- Betty Carter, 'Round Midnight (Atco, 1963)
- Joe Chambers, The Almoravid (Muse, 1974)
- Judy Collins, Bread and Roses (Elektra, 1976)
- Eddie Daniels, First Prize! (Prestige, 1967)
- Bo Diddley, Where It All Began (Chess, 1972)
- Kenny Dorham, Trompeta Toccata (Blue Note, 1965)
- Jonathan Edwards, Have a Good Time for Me (Alto, 1973)
- Art Farmer, New York Jazz Sextet: Group Therapy (Scepter, 1966)
- José Feliciano, The Voice and Guitar of José Feliciano (Sony, 1965)
- Maynard Ferguson, The Blues Roar (Mainstream, 1965)
- Ricky Ford, Loxodonta Africana (New World, 1977)
- Jimmy Forrest, Soul Street (New Jazz, 1962)
- Frank Foster, Soul Outing! (Prestige, 1966)
- Don Friedman, Metamorphosis (Prestige, 1966)
- Red Garland, Equinox (Galaxy, 1978)
- Dizzy Gillespie, Cornucopia (Solid State, 1969)
- Eddie Harris, Silver Cycles (Atlantic, 1968)
- Johnny Hartman, The Voice That Is! (Impulse!, 1964)
- Roy Haynes, Togyu (RCA, 1975)
- Don Henley, Cass County (Capitol, 2015)
- Mieko Hirota, Step Across (CBS, 1978)
- Freddie Hubbard, The Hub of Hubbard (Blue Note, 1970)
- Bobby Hutcherson, Dialogue (Blue Note, 1965)
- Garland Jeffreys, Garland Jeffreys (Atlantic, 1973)
- Rickie Lee Jones, It's Like This (Artemis, 2000)
- Eric Kaz, If You're Lonely (Atlantic, 1972)
- Morgana King, Miss Morgana King (Reprise, 1965)
- Charles Lloyd, Discovery! (Columbia, 1964)
- Gloria Loring, And Now We Come to Distances (Evolution, 1969)
- Johnny Lytle, A Man and a Woman (Solid State, 1967)
- Junior Mance, I Believe to My Soul (Atlantic, 1968)
- Melissa Manchester, Bright Eyes (Bells, 1974)
- Gary McFarland and Gabor Szabo, Simpatico with Gabor Szabo (Impulse!, 1966)
- Kate & Anna McGarrigle, Dancer with Bruised Knees (Warner Bros., 1977)
- Charles Mingus, Let My Children Hear Music (Columbia, 1972)
- James Moody, Great Day (Argo, 1963)
- Essra Mohawk, Essra (Private Stock, 1976)
- Van Morrison, Astral Weeks (Warner Bros., 1968)
- Danny O'Keefe, Breezy Stories (Atlantic, 1973)
- Tony Orlando and Dawn, To Be With You (Elektra, 1976)
- Esther Phillips, Esther Phillips Sings (Atlantic, 1966)
- Bonnie Raitt, Streetlights (Warner Bros., 1974)
- Sam Rivers, Hues (Impulse!, 1973)
- Richard Roundtree, The Man from Shaft (MGM, 1972)
- Pharoah Sanders, Karma (Impulse!, 1969)
- Michel Sardaby, Michel Sardaby in New York (Sound Hills, 2002)
- Carole Bayer Sager, ...Too (Elektra, 1978)
- Marlena Shaw, Marlena (Blue Note, 1972)
- Sonny Simmons, Burning Spirits (Contemporary, 1971)
- Carly Simon, Hotcakes (Elektra, 1974)
- John Simon, John Simon's Album (Warner Bros., 1970)
- Paul Simon, There Goes Rhymin' Simon (Columbia, 1973)
- Frank Sinatra, Watertown (Reprise, 1970)
- Phoebe Snow, Second Childhood (Columbia, 1976)
- Ed Summerlin, Ring Out Joy (Avant-Garde, 1968)
- Clark Terry, Mumbles (Mainstream, 1966)
- Lucky Thompson, Lucky Strikes (Prestige, 1964)
- The Manhattan Transfer, Vocalese (Atlantic, 1985)
- Mickey Tucker and Roland Hanna, The New Heritage Keyboard Quartet (Blue Note, 1973)
- Phil Upchurch, Feeling Blue (Milestone, 1967)
- Sarah Vaughan, Swingin' Easy (EmArcy, 1957)
- Mal Waldron, Sweet Love, Bitter (Impulse!, 1967)
- Cedar Walton, Spectrum (Prestige, 1968)
- Walter Wanderley, Moondreams (A&M, 1969)
- Joe Williams, Presenting Joe Williams and Thad Jones/Mel Lewis, the Jazz Orchestra (Solid State, 1966)
- Reuben Wilson, Set Us Free (Blue Note, 1971)
- Kai Winding, More Brass (Verve, 1966)
- Jimmy Witherspoon, Blues for Easy Livers (Prestige, 1965)
- Emily Yancy, Yancy (Mainstream, 1965)
- Joe Zawinul, The Rise and Fall of the Third Stream (Vortex, 1968)
- Zulema, Zulema (Sussex, 1972)
