= Joseph Lloyd House =

Historic house in New York, United States

- Joseph Lloyd Manor House
- U.S. National Register of Historic Places
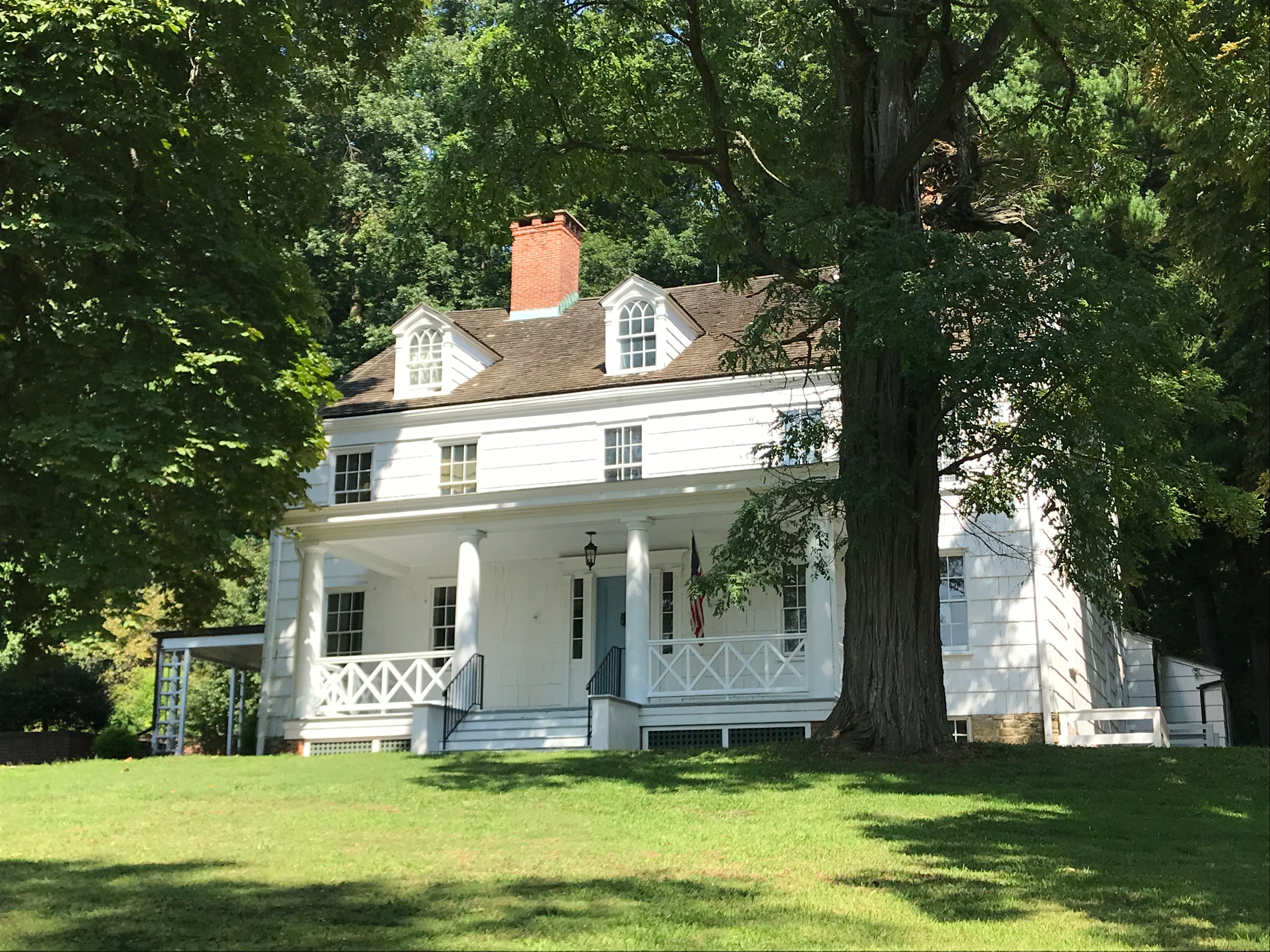
- Joseph Lloyd Manor (2018)

- Location within New York Location within the United States
- Location: 1 Lloyd Lane, Lloyd Harbor, New York
- Coordinates: 40°54′51.3″N 73°28′39.1″W
- Built: 1767
- Architectural style: Georgian
- NRHP reference No.: 76001278
- Added to NRHP: November 7, 1976

The Joseph Lloyd Manor house is a historical site and Literary Landmark located in Lloyd Harbor, Suffolk County New York. The house was built between 1766 and 1767 on the Manor of Queens Village, a 3,000-acre provisioning plantation established in the late 17th century on the ancestral lands of the Matinecock Nation. The entire estate encompassed all of what is known today as Lloyd Neck. The house was built for Joseph Lloyd (1716–1780) and remained in the Lloyd family for a century before being sold in 1876. It is most significant today for being where Jupiter Hammon (1711–before 1806), the first published Black American poet, was enslaved by the Lloyd family and authored his best-known works. Today, Joseph Lloyd Manor is owned by Preservation Long Island and is used to educate the public about Long Island's colonial and early national history, the region's history of enslavement, and the legacy of Jupiter Hammon.

== History of ownership ==
The construction of Joseph Lloyd Manor house was commissioned by Joseph Lloyd, the third son of Henry Lloyd I (1685–1763) and Rebecca Nelson Lloyd (1688–1728). Henry Lloyd was a Boston and Newport merchant and the second lord of the Manor of Queens Village. In 1711, he had the first manor house built on Lloyd Neck where Joseph Lloyd and Jupiter Hammon were born. When Henry died in 1763, the entire manorial estate was subdivided among his four surviving sons and the 1711 house passed to Henry Lloyd II (1709–1795), who encouraged Joseph to build a house suitable to his wealth and status. In the aftermath of the Battle of Long Island in 1776, British soldiers occupied the entirety of Lloyd Neck, including Joseph Lloyd Manor. While in exile in Connecticut, Joseph took his own life. Unmarried and without children, he bequeathed his entire estate to his nephew, John Lloyd II (1745–1792), who found the house and land severely damaged after the war. Following John's death in 1792, his widow, Amelia, served as administrator of the estate until the final disposition was completed in 1809 when their son, John Nelson Lloyd (1783–1841), inherited the property. John Nelson Lloyd's son, Henry Lloyd IV (1822–1892), would be the last member of the Lloyd family to own Joseph Lloyd Manor. He struggled financially, and in 1876, sold the house to James C. Townsend of Oyster Bay to pay off debts. In 1882, Anne Coleman Alden (1818–1896) purchased the house following the construction of Fort Hill House, her summer residence on Lloyd Neck. Alden's estate, including Joseph Lloyd Manor, was then sold in 1900 to William John Matheson. He occupied Fort Hill House while his daughter Anna and her husband Willis D. Wood moved into Joseph Lloyd Manor in 1905. The Woods made it their summer home until they moved to Fort Hill House after Mr. Matheson's death in 1930. Mrs. Wood subsequently rented the Joseph Lloyd Manor house to a number of tenants, among them Charles Lindbergh, who lived there with his family from February 1940 until August 1941. Finally, Mrs. Anna Matheson Wood gifted Joseph Lloyd Manor to the Society for the Preservation of Long Island Antiquities in 1968. Today, the Society is known as Preservation Long Island and continues to steward the house.

== Building and architecture ==
=== Exterior ===
The Joseph Lloyd Manor is situated on a hill on the south side of Lloyd Neck facing what was then Horse Neck Harbor, today Lloyd Harbor. In 1765, Joseph Lloyd commissioned Abner Osborne, a Connecticut carpenter, to build the windows, shingles, interior architectural finishes, and the courtyard around the house. Lloyd Neck was dense with trees, giving the builders an unlimited amount of wood to use for the construction of the house. The structure's symmetry and balanced design reflect the simple elegance of high-style, Pre-Revolutionary architecture. The façade features five bays: a central front door with two, symmetrically spaced windows on either side. The front door is flanked by fluted pilasters with a segmental pediment above. The second floor also features a bay of five windows that correspond with the four windows and door below. When originally constructed, the house design included an uncovered wooden stoop and two symmetrical central chimneys.

=== Interior ===
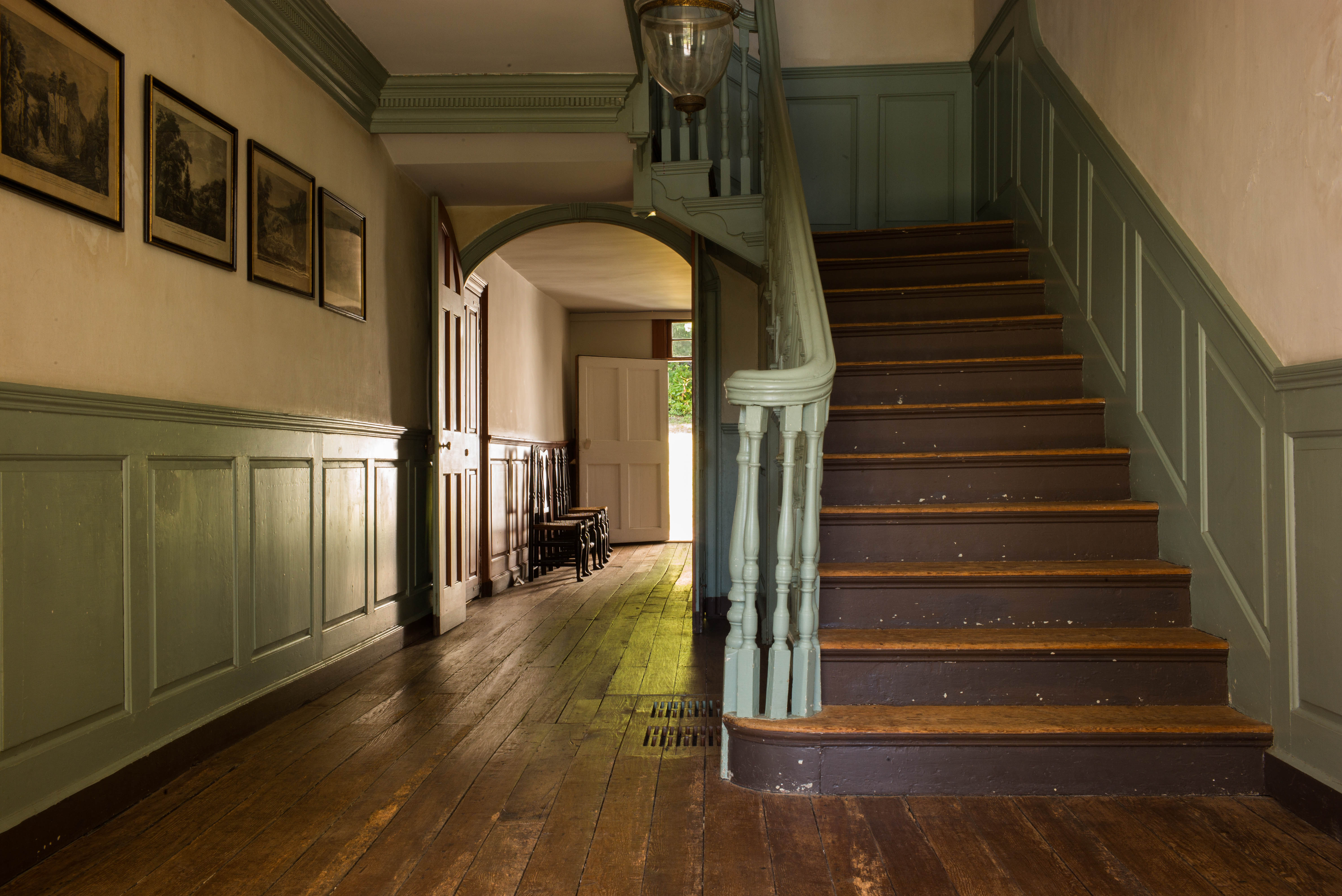
The front hall of the Joseph Lloyd Manor House.

The interior continues the sophisticated style of the exterior. Builder Abner Osborne's craftsmanship is illustrated by the formal woodwork and decorated fireplaces. The entrance features a central hallway with fielded paneling and a grand staircase with a mahogany banister and finely-turned balusters. The front central hallway opens up to four large rooms, two on either side. The rooms served multiple functions from business to formal entertaining. A kitchen with a large fireplace is located in the back of the first floor, accessible by a rear service entrance and staircase that was used by the many people the Lloyds enslaved. Lesser quality materials and finishes demarcate the front public spaces and the rear work areas of the house. The front hallway on the second floor mimics the layout of the floor below, with living quarters for the family in the front and a likely enslaved quarter in the back that directly connects to the rear staircase.

=== Alterations and restorations ===
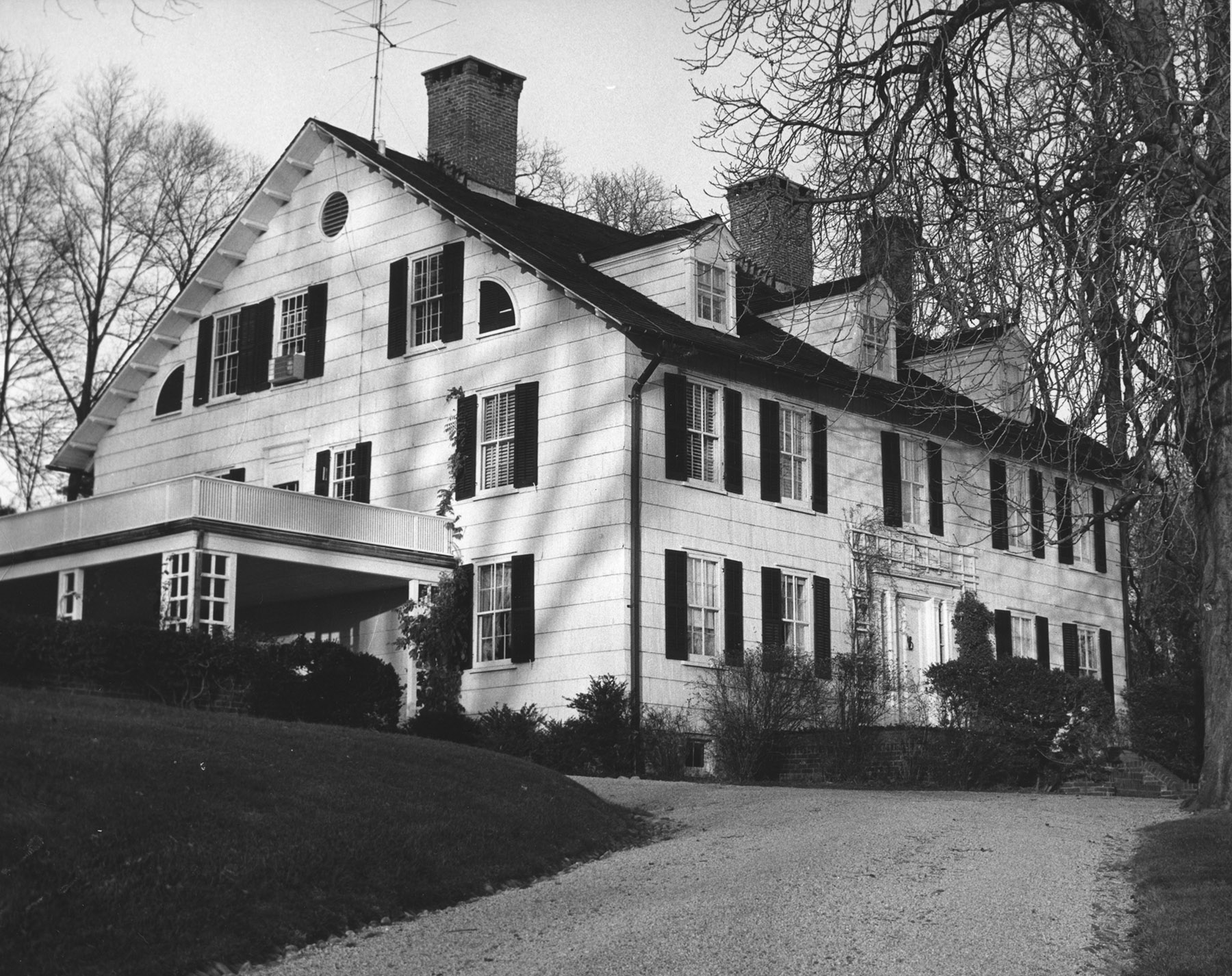
Appearance of Joseph Lloyd Manor during the Matheson-Wood era.

Major and minor renovations have been made to Joseph Lloyd Manor since its original construction between 1766 and 1767, but its 18th-century core remains intact. When John Lloyd II returned to Lloyd Neck following the evacuation of New York by the British, he updated interior architectural features that were likely damaged during the British occupation of the house. It is possible that his son, John Nelson Lloyd, changed the front door to the Greek Revival-style one that survives today and added a large porch. An 1884 print of Joseph Lloyd Manor depicting Victorian-era gables indicates that a major renovation occurred during the middle of the 19th century. No further major alterations took place until 1908 when Anna Matheson Wood lived in the house. She added modern plumbing, heating, and electrical systems, and altered the floorplan by converting a closet and two small bedrooms into bathrooms and adding a large service wing off the kitchen. On the exterior front, Mrs. Wood replaced the Victorian-era gables with three Colonial Revival gabled dormers and removed the porch. She also added a portico off the side leading to a garden enclosed with low brick walls. When the Society for the Preservation of Long Island Antiquities (today Preservation Long Island) acquired the house, the organization embarked on a major preservation and restoration campaign to transform Anna Matheson Wood's Colonial Revival-style country house into a historic house museum. The Society reconstructed the Greek-Revival porch, removed Mrs. Wood's modern kitchen, and commissioned a series of architectural and paint analyses to bring the appearance of the interior back to the late 18th century.

== Slavery ==
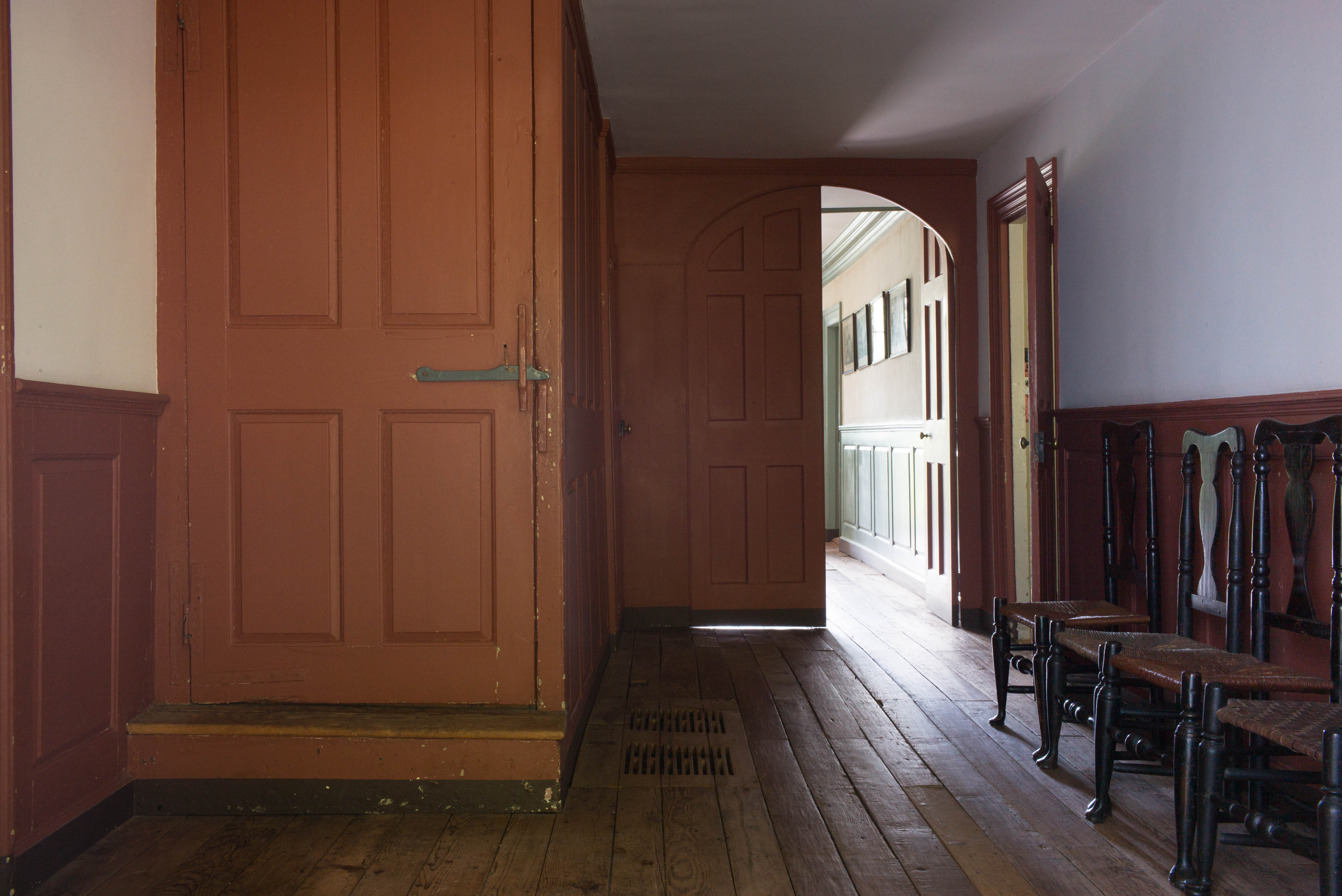
The back hall of the Joseph Lloyd Manor House used by enslaved servants.

Slavery in New York dates back to 17th-century New Netherland and was essential to the social and economic development and growth of the region. Since the 1670s, the Lloyd family participated in the slave trade, relying on enslaved laborers to make their land on Lloyd Neck profitable. Both the 1711 Henry Lloyd Manor house and the Joseph Lloyd Manor house were designed to accommodate the presence of enslaved people. At Joseph Lloyd Manor, enslaved families likely slept in the basement, attic, and a small, centrally located room on the second floor. Although the Lloyds and the people they enslaved lived under the same roof, a back staircase and rear passageways segregated the worlds of the enslavers and the enslaved. According to the 1790 United States Census, 15 people were enslaved across the Manor of Queens Village, making the Lloyds among the largest enslavers in what was then considered part of the Town of Oyster Bay in Queens County. In the 1793 inventory of John Lloyd II's estate, eight enslaved people are listed among his property at Joseph Lloyd Manor: John Potter, Judith Potter, Hannah, Boston, Benjamin, Samuel, Edward, Sarah, and Jupiter Hammon. The people the Lloyd family enslaved would form the basis of a resilient Black community that developed around Lloyd Neck.

=== Jupiter Hammon ===
As the first published Black American poet, Jupiter Hammon is the most notable of the people enslaved at the Manor of Queens Village, surviving three generations of enslavement by the Lloyd family. Jupiter was born into slavery on October 17, 1711, in the Henry Lloyd Manor house. Following Henry Lloyd I's death in 1763, Hammon was enslaved by Joseph Lloyd who subsequently bequeathed his entire estate, including Jupiter Hammon, to his nephew John Lloyd II in 1780. Hammon is believed to have been the son of Rose and Obium, a couple enslaved on Lloyd Neck. Obium was born into slavery at Sylvester Manor on Shelter Island and was the son of an African-born couple, Tammero and Oyou. From his father, Hammon inherited a Book of Psalms. With the encouragement of the Lloyd family, Hammon learned to read and write and at the age of 49, authored his first published poem, "An Evening Thought, Salvation by Christ with Penitential Cries", in 1760. During his lifetime, Hammon authored numerous essays and poems that reflect his intelligence, deep Christian faith, and views concerning the social and moral conflicts of slavery and freedom in the early United States. While enslaved at Joseph Lloyd Manor, Hammon penned his two most significant works in 1786: "An Address to the Negroes in the State of New-York" and the unpublished "An Essay on Slavery". Although Hammon expressed reluctance about his personal freedom, he was likely freed after the death of John Lloyd II in 1792. Following manumission, the 1800 census places Hammon in a home in Huntington Village with his grandnephew, Benjamin Hammond, and Benjamin's wife, Phoebe. Jupiter probably supported the family with income from an orchard planted for him before the Revolutionary War. Following Jupiter's death sometime before 1806, Benjamin, who did not inherit the orchard or any of its proceeds, fell into poverty and was forced to sell the house.

== The Revolutionary War ==
Following victory at the Battle of Long Island, the British army established its headquarters in Manhattan and expanded eastward with the construction of fortifications on Long Island. Fort Franklin was built on the western side of Lloyd Neck, anchoring the British presence in Suffolk County and providing protection from American soldiers garrisoned across the Sound in Connecticut. In addition to providing camp and provisions for troops, Fort Franklin served as a connection point between British forces stationed in Manhattan and eastern Long Island. Nearly 800 Loyalist garrisons occupied Lloyd Neck between 1776 and 1783, causing Patriots Joseph Lloyd and John Lloyd II to flee to Connecticut with Jupiter Hammon. The manor house was likely used to quarter British officers and soldiers, and woodcutters chopped down almost three-quarters of the timber on the property. While in exile in Hartford, Joseph Lloyd committed suicide in 1780 and his nephew, John Lloyd II, inherited his entire estate. Following the war, Jupiter Hammon and John Lloyd II returned to a manor house severely damaged by wartime occupation.

== The Joseph Lloyd Manor House today ==
Joseph Lloyd Manor opened to the public in May 1982. Today, Preservation Long Island offers tours and programs to educate students and the public about the historical significance of the site, Jupiter Hammon's story, and Long Island's history of enslavement. The house is currently interpreted to the post-Revolutionary period and is furnished according to the 1793 estate inventory of Joseph Lloyd's nephew, John Lloyd II. On October 17, 2020, United for Libraries designated Joseph Lloyd Manor a Literary Landmark in honor of Jupiter Hammon. Preservation Long Island is continuing to work with community stakeholders to research and interpret the stories of the enslaved at Joseph Lloyd Manor while confronting the region's legacy of slavery through the ongoing Jupiter Hammon Project.
