= Bill Lee (musician) =

American musician and composer (1928–2023)

- Publicity photo of Bill Lee

Background information
- Also known as: William J. E. Lee
- Born: William James Edwards Lee; July 23, 1928; Snow Hill, Alabama, U.S.
- Died: May 24, 2023 (aged 94) New York City, U.S.
- Genre: Jazz
- Occupations: Composer, conductor, actor
- Instruments: Double bass, bass guitar
- Labels: Strata-East Records, Columbia Records
- Formerly of: Aretha Franklin, Odetta, Bob Dylan, Judy Collins, Terence Blanchard

William James Edwards Lee III (July 23, 1928 – May 24, 2023) was an American jazz bassist and composer, known for his collaborations with Bob Dylan and Aretha Franklin, his compositions for jazz percussionist Max Roach, and his session work as a "first-call" musician and band leader to many of the twentieth-century's most significant musical artists, including Duke Ellington, Billie Holiday, Harry Belafonte, Peter, Paul and Mary, Simon and Garfunkel, Judy Collins, Arlo Guthrie, Billy Strayhorn, Woody Guthrie, and Pete Seeger, among many others.

Lee recorded three critically acclaimed albums at the Black independent label Strata-East Records: (1) The Descendants of Mike and Phoebe: A Spirit Speaks; (2) The Brass Company: Colors, in collaboration with his two sisters; and (3) The New York Bass Violin Choir, a collaboration of seven basses, which JazzdaGama described as "a true Holy Grail for all musicians," and which Lee classified as one of his "narrative folk, jazz operas" along with "One Mile East," both of which were inspired by memories of the former slave quarters near his childhood home. Stagings at New York City's Central Park, Lincoln Center and Newport Jazz Festival followed all of these recordings.

Trumpeter Theo Croker called Lee "one of the great American composers of our time. His harmonic beauty was unique and his choice of melody always struck a chord inside of the listener. He was a masterful orchestrator of imagery." In 2008, The New York Times noted that "His music has the complex harmonies of bebop and hard bop, but it also has a sincere, down-home, churchy feel. His passages move to interesting and unexpected places, but they resolve before long in a way that is simple and sincere, earthy and somehow very satisfying."

Featured in more than 250 record albums, and on such songs as "Puff, the Magic Dragon" and "Mr. Tambourine Man," Lee also appeared in several movies made by his son, acclaimed film-maker Spike Lee, in addition to creating original soundtracks for She's Gotta Have It (1986), School Daze (1988), Do the Right Thing (1989), and Mo' Better Blues (1990).

== Career ==
Lee's childhood was described by Strata-East co-founder Charles Tolliver as "the personification of the Black musicians' experience after Reconstruction." One of seven musical siblings, Lee was born in Snow Hill, Alabama in 1928, the son of Arnold Wadsworth Lee, a cornet player and band director at Florida A&M University, and Alberta Grace (née Edwards), a concert pianist. "My learning in music started with my mother and father," Lee said.

A 1951 graduate of the historically Black Morehouse College in Atlanta, Lee "discovered the bebop recordings of Charlie Parker," which led to him "master[ing] the double bass, ... and performing with small jazz groups in Atlanta and Chicago before migrating to New York City in 1959".

A sideman for some of the most famous names in music, Lee was also often the only other musician performing, including on the original release of Dylan's 1965 classic "It's All Over Now, Baby Blue" and on Gordon Lightfoot's "Oh, Linda" from the prize-winning 1964 eponymous album. Other musical collaborators included:

- Chris Anderson
- Burt Bacharach
- Eric Bibb
- The Clancy Brothers
- Judy Collins
- Stanley Cowell
- Carolyn Hester
- John Lee Hooker
- Clifford Jordan
- Cat Stevens
- Chad Mitchell Trio
- Ian & Sylvia
- Odetta
- Mamas & Papas
- Malvina Reynolds
- Harold Mabern
- Carmen McRae
- Tom Rush
- Tom Paxton
- Charles Tolliver
- Harold Vick
- Josh White
- The Womenfolk
- Olatunji Yearwood

== Soundtracks ==
- Music director and performer on the song "Nola," She's Gotta Have It, Island, 1986.
- Music conductor of Natural Spiritual Orchestra, School Daze, Columbia, 1988.
- Music conductor of Natural Spiritual Orchestra, Do the Right Thing, Universal, 1989.
- Music director, Mo' Better Blues, Universal, 1990.
- Composer of score for the short film Joe's Bed-Stuy Barbershop: We Cut Heads.

== Filmography ==
- Sonny Darling, She's Gotta Have It, Island, 1986.
- Bassist in the Phyllis Hyman Quartet, School Daze, Columbia, 1988.
- Father of the Bride, Mo' Better Blues, Universal, 1990.

== Selective discography ==
- John Handy: No Coast Jazz (Roulette, 1960)
- Ray Bryant: Con Alma (Columbia, 1960), Dancing the Big Twist (Columbia, 1961)
- Chris Anderson: Inverted Image (Jazzland, 1961), My Romance (Vee-Jay, 1983)
- Johnny Griffin: Change of Pace (Riverside, 1961)
- John Lee Hooker: The Folk Lore of John Lee Hooker (Vee-Jay, 1961)
- Aretha Franklin: Aretha: With The Ray Bryant Combo (Columbia, 1961), The Tender, the Moving, the Swinging Aretha Franklin (Columbia, 1962)
- Frank Strozier: March of the Siamese Children (Jazzland, 1962)
- Ian and Sylvia: Ian & Sylvia (Vanguard, 1962)
- Judy Collins: Golden Apples of the Sun (Elektra, 1962), Fifth Album (Elektra, 1965), Whales & Nightingales (Elektra, 1970)
- Simon & Garfunkel: Wednesday Morning, 3 A.M. (Columbia, 1964)
- José Feliciano: The Voice and Guitar of José Feliciano (Sony, 1965)
- Tom Rush: Tom Rush (Elektra, 1965), Take a Little Walk with Me (Elektra, 1966)
- Peter, Paul & Mary: The Peter, Paul and Mary Album (Warner Bros., 1966)
- Gordon Lightfoot: Lightfoot! (United Artists, 1966)
- Richard Davis: The Philosophy of the Spiritual (Cobblestone, 1971), Fancy Free (Galaxy, 1977), Harvest (Muse, 1979)
- Clifford Jordan: Glass Bead Games (Strata-East, 1974); The Adventurer (Muse, 1978)
- Stanley Cowell: Regeneration (Strata-East, 1976)
- Chuck Loeb and Andy LaVerne: Magic Fingers (DMP, 1989)
- The Descendants of Mike and Phoebe: A Spirit Speaks (Strata-East)
- The Brass Company: Colors (Strata East)
- The Warm Voice of Billy "C": Where have you been Billy Boy (Strata East)
- Harold Mabern: A Few Miles from Memphis (Prestige), Rakin' and Scrapin' (Prestige)
- The New York Bass Violin Choir - The New York Bass Violin Choir (Strata-East)
- Mike Bloomfield: From His Head to His Heart to His Hands (Sony Legacy, 2014) Bill plays on "I'm a County Boy", "Judge, Judge", and "Hammond's Rag" from a 1964 audition for John Hammond at Columbia Records.

== Personal life ==
In 1954, Lee married Jacqueline ("Jackie") Shelton, an art teacher, the same year she graduated from Atlanta's historically Black Spelman College. Together, they had five children: film director Spike Lee (b. 1957), Christopher (b. 1958, d. 2013), still photographer David Lee (b. 1961), screenwriter and actress Joie Lee (b. 1962), and filmmaker Cinqué Lee (b. 1966). In 1959, the family moved to Fort Greene, Brooklyn.

In 1976, Jackie died of cancer, and Susan Kaplan, whom Lee later married, moved in. They are the parents of alto saxophone player Arnold ("T@NE") Lee (b. 1985). Spike Lee had a negative public reaction to his father's new relationship, and has been quoted as saying, "My mother wasn't even cold in her grave." Hard feelings between the two intensified after Spike Lee released Jungle Fever, a film about the beginning and end of an extramarital interracial relationship, which was interpreted as a judgment on Lee and Kaplan's relationship, given the latter's race.

On October 25, 1991, Lee was arrested for carrying a small bag of heroin during a police drug sweep of a park near his home. Although the case was dismissed, Lee would later say of his arrest, "I'm glad I was arrested. It woke me up.... Dope was not part of my life until I was 40 years old". Soon after, however, Lee and Spike Lee had a falling out. In 1994, the elder Lee said they had not spoken in two years.

On May 24, 2023, Lee died at his home in Fort Greene. He was 94.
