= The Folks Who Live on the Hill =

1937 song performed by Peggy Lee

"The Folks Who Live on the Hill" is a 1937 popular song composed by Jerome Kern, with lyrics by Oscar Hammerstein II.

It was introduced by Irene Dunne in the 1937 film High, Wide, and Handsome and was recorded that year by Bing Crosby for Decca (#1462, mx DLA940A, Los Angeles 9/20/37). Guy Lombardo enjoyed chart success with the song in 1937. It has become particularly associated with Peggy Lee, who sang it on her 1957 album The Man I Love. Lee's version was arranged by Nelson Riddle and conducted by Frank Sinatra.

== Other notable recordings ==
- Johnny Mathis - Johnny's Mood (1960)
- Bill Henderson - Bill Henderson with the Oscar Peterson Trio (1963)
- Gloria Lynne - Gloria, Marty & Strings (1963)
- Sammy Davis Jr. - Sammy Davis Jr. Sings and Laurindo Almeida Plays (1966)
- Johnny Hartman - Today (1972)
- Chris Anderson - Love Locked Out (1990)
- Tony Bennett - Astoria: Portrait of the Artist (1990)
- Nina Simone - A Single Woman (1993)
- Diana Krall - Only Trust Your Heart (1995)
- Bette Midler - Bette Midler Sings the Peggy Lee Songbook (2005)
- Eric Clapton - Old Sock (2013)
- Jimmy Scott and Joe Pesci - I Go Back Home (2016)
- Gabriel Kahane - Haircuts & Airports (EP) (2014)
- Peter Hammill - In Translation (2021)
