= Jill McManus =

American jazz pianist, composer, teacher and author

Jill McManus (born July 28, 1940 in Englewood, New Jersey) is an American jazz pianist, composer, teacher, and author.

Her mother was a novelist.

== Discography ==
=== As leader ===
Symbols of Hopi (1984), w/ T. Harrell, D. Liebman, M. Johnson, B. Hart

=== As sideman ===
With Richard Davis

- As One (Muse, 1975)
