= Heavy Sounds =

Studio album by Elvin Jones & Richard Davis
- Released: May 1968
- Recorded: June 19–20, 1967
- Genre: Jazz
- Length: 41:21
- Label: Impulse!
- Producer: Bob Thiele

Elvin Jones chronology
| Midnight Walk (1966) | Heavy Sounds (1968) | Live at the Village Vanguard (1968) |

Richard Davis chronology
| Heavy Sounds (1967) | Muses for Richard Davis (1969) |

Heavy Sounds is an album by American jazz drummer Elvin Jones and bassist Richard Davis, recorded in 1967 and released on the Impulse! label.

== Background ==
Heavy Sounds was originally intended to be a trio date, with Jones, Davis, and guitarist Larry Coryell. However, Coryell did not appear, and producer Bob Thiele suggested that Jones and Davis play something together in his absence. The result was a 11½ minute duet version of "Summertime". Davis recalled: "No discussion, no editing, no plan, I just started playing the melody, and there he was... and I just thought there was some very brotherly thing about that particular piece."

Thiele then suggested that the two musicians return to the studio the following day, and Jones invited saxophonist Frank Foster and pianist Billy Greene to join them. Together, they recorded a standard ("Here's That Rainy Day"), a tune by Greene ("M.E."), and two by Foster ("Raunchy Rita" and "Shiny Stockings"), as well as a version of "Take the 'A' Train" that was subsequently lost. An additional track, titled "Elvin's Guitar Blues" was also recorded, with Jones on acoustic guitar. He explained: "I'm not a real guitarist, but it's something that I love... It was one of these old blues tunes — something an old man, his name was Red, taught me when I was a kid... I've always liked to play that because it was one of the first pieces I learned how to play. And I like to listen to these old guitar players: Muddy Waters, John Lee Hooker..."

== Reception ==
Professional ratings
Review scores
| Source | Rating |
|---|---|
| AllMusic | 3/5 stars |
| The Penguin Guide to Jazz Recordings | 2/4 stars |
| The Rolling Stone Jazz Record Guide | 4/5 stars |

The AllMusic review by Scott Yanow stated: "The music is essentially advanced hard bop but is not all that essential." The authors of The Penguin Guide to Jazz Recordings called the album "a series of feature spots, stitched together with some suspect ensemble-play."

== Track listing ==
1. "Raunchy Rita" (Frank Foster) - 11:35
2. "Shiny Stockings" (Foster) - 5:13
3. "M.E." (Billy Greene) - 2:40
4. "Summertime" (George Gershwin, Ira Gershwin, DuBose Heyward) - 11:37
5. "Elvin's Guitar Blues" (Elvin Jones) - 3:29
6. "Here's That Rainy Day" (Johnny Burke, Jimmy Van Heusen) - 7:02

- Recorded at RCA Recording Studio, New York City, on June 19 (4) & 20, 1967.

== Personnel ==
- Elvin Jones - drums, guitar (5)
- Richard Davis - bass
- Frank Foster - tenor saxophone
- Billy Greene - piano
