= Inward Fire =

Studio album by Clifford Jordan
- Released: 1978
- Recorded: April 5, 1977
- Studio: CI Recording Studios, NYC
- Genre: Jazz
- Length: 44:06
- Label: Muse; MR 5128
- Producer: Franklin Fuentes and Charles Thomas

Clifford Jordan chronology
Remembering Me-Me (1976)	Inward Fire (1978)	The Adventurer (1978)

Inward Fire is an album by saxophonist Clifford Jordan which was recorded in New York City in 1977 and released on the Muse label.

== Reception ==
Professional ratings
Review scores
Source	Rating
Allmusic	4/5 stars
The Rolling Stone Jazz Record Guide	4/5 stars
DownBeat	4/5 stars

The Allmusic site rated the album with 4 stars.

DownBeat gave the release 4 stars. The review praised the album saying, "the skillful solo work and crisp rhythms by Louis Hayes, Richard Davis, and Azzedine Weston make this album well worth having".

== Track listing ==
All compositions by Clifford Jordan except as indicated

1. "Inward Fire" - 6:40
2. "Abracadabra" - 6:41
3. "The Look" (Dizzy Reece) - 8:12
4. "Toy" - 6:08
5. "Buddy Bolden's Call" - 7:00
6. "Eat at Joe's" (Reece) - 9:25

== Personnel ==
- Clifford Jordan - tenor saxophone, flute
- Dizzy Reece - trumpet
- Howard Johnson - tuba
- Pat Patrick - tenor saxophone, flute
- Muhal Richard Abrams - piano
- Jimmy Ponder - guitar
- Richard Davis - bass
- Louis Hayes, Grover Everette - drums
- Azzedine Weston - congas
- Donna Jewel Jordan (track 2), Joe Lee Wilson (track 5) - vocals
