= Fort Hill Estate =

Historic house in New York, United States

- U.S. National Register of Historic Places
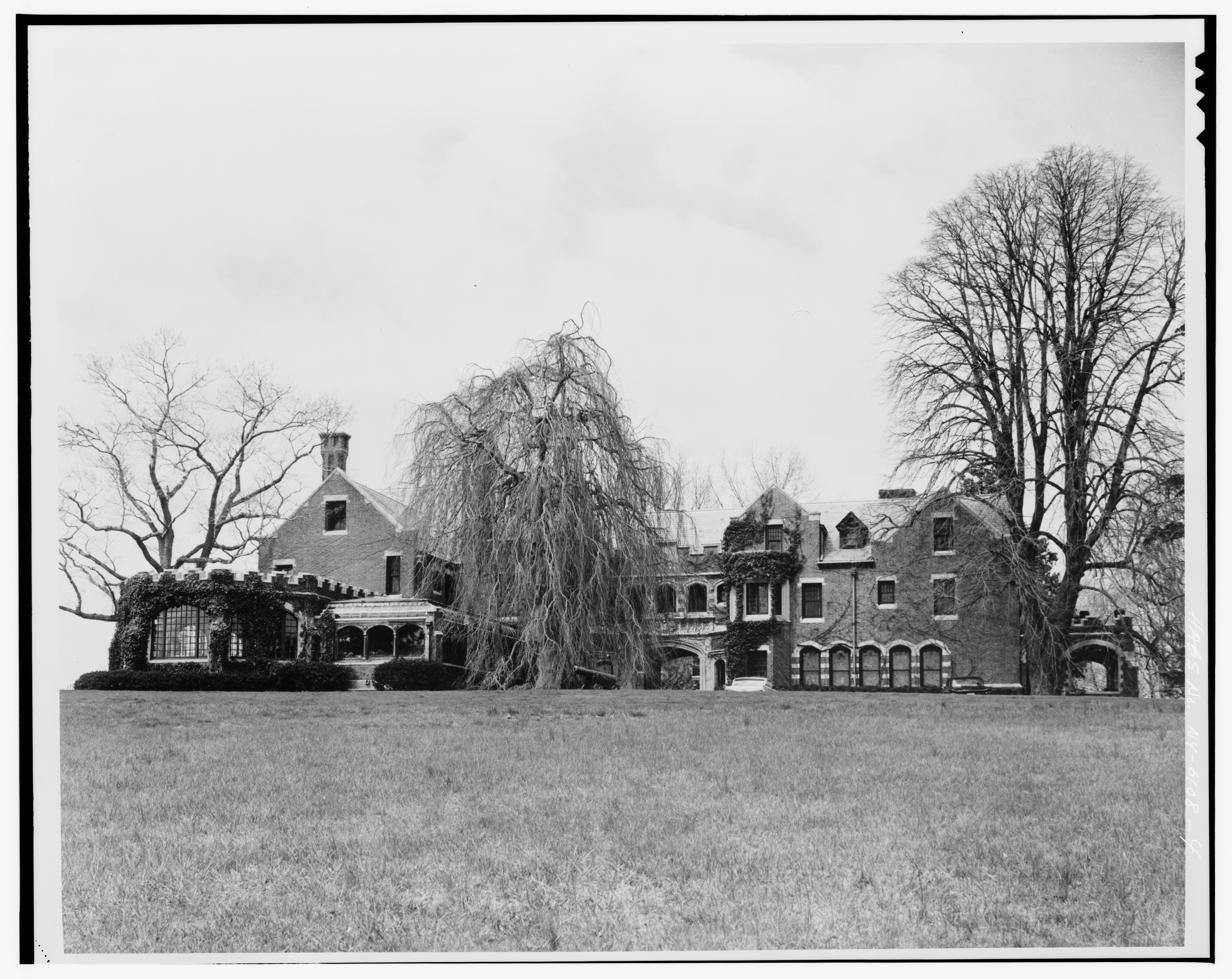
- South side of the estate

- Location within New York Location within the United States
- Location: Fort Hill Dr., Lloyd Harbor, New York
- Coordinates: 40°55′4″N 73°29′19″W
- Area: 22.8 acres (9.2 ha)
- Built: 1879
- Architect: McKim, Mead & Bigelow; Boring & Tilton
- Architectural style: Tudor Revival
- NRHP reference No.: 88000599
- Added to NRHP: June 02, 1988

Fort Hill Estate is a historic estate located at Lloyd Harbor in Suffolk County, New York on the site of the British Revolutionary War Fort Franklin (New York). The estate home is a monumental brick and limestone Tudor Revival style structure built as a summer home for Anne Alden in 1879, and enlarged for the industrialist William John Matheson in 1900. It is a three-story mansion with an irregular, asymmetrical and sprawling plan which is roughly C-shaped. It features a conical tower built as part of the original structure, designed by McKim, Mead, and White. Also on the estate are a formal garden, a water tower, a superintendent's house, two garages, and a cottage.

It was added to the National Register of Historic Places in 1988.
