= Love Locked Out (album) =

Studio album by Chris Anderson
- Released: 1990
- Recorded: October 20–21, 1987
- Studio: Mapleshade Studio, Upper Marlboro, MD
- Genre: Jazz
- Length: 57:50
- Label: Mapleshade; JLP 57

Chris Anderson chronology
Inverted Image (1961)	Love Locked Out (1990)	Blues One (1991)

Love Locked Out is a solo album by jazz pianist Chris Anderson which was recorded in 1987 and released on the Mapleshade label in 1990.

== Reception ==
Professional ratings
Review scores
Source	Rating
AllMusic	4/5 stars
The Penguin Guide to Jazz	3/4 stars

The AllMusic site awarded the album 4 stars stating "Anderson's breezy noodling on standards, his own poignant originals, and overall aggressiveness were passed on to many prized pupils, as well as Hancock; now, the teacher gets some credit".

== Track listing ==
All compositions by Chris Anderson except where noted.

1. "Where or When" (Richard Rodgers, Lorenz Hart) - 9:01
2. "Detour Ahead" (Herb Ellis, Johnny Frigo, Lou Carter) - 5:30
3. "So Blue" - 7:03
4. "Love Locked Out" (Ray Noble, Max Kester) - 5:02
5. "Send in the Clowns" (Stephen Sondheim) - 6:55
6. "The Folks Who Live on the Hill" (Jerome Kern, Oscar Hammerstein II) - 6:06
7. "For Seana" - 6:52
8. "Sandy's Song" - 5:50
9. "Love Letters" (Victor Young, Edward Heyman) - 5:31

== Personnel ==
- Chris Anderson – piano, vocals
