= The Adventurer (album) =

Studio album by Clifford Jordan
- Released: 1980
- Recorded: February 9, 1978
- Studio: CI Recording Studios, NYC
- Genre: Jazz
- Length: 35:11
- Label: Muse; MR 5163
- Producer: Franklin Fuentes

Clifford Jordan chronology
Inward Fire (1977)	The Adventurer (1980)	Hello, Hank Jones (1978)

The Adventurer is an album by saxophonist Clifford Jordan which was recorded in New York City in 1978 and first released on the Muse label.

== Reception ==
Professional ratings
Review scores
Source	Rating
AllMusic	4/5 stars
The Rolling Stone Jazz Record Guide	3/5 stars

AllMusic reviewer Ron Wynn described the album as being "Steady, with consistently interesting and gripping solos".

== Track listing ==
All compositions by Clifford Jordan, except as indicated.

1. "He's a Hero" – 5:19
2. "Quasimodo" (Charlie Parker) – 7:08
3. "No More" (Tutti Camarata, Bob Russell) – 4:54
4. "Blues for Muse" – 5:06
5. "Adventurer" – 6:49
6. "I'll Be Around" (Alec Wilder) – 5:55

== Personnel ==
- Clifford Jordan – tenor saxophone, alto saxophone, flute
- Tommy Flanagan – piano
- Bill Lee – bass
- Grady Tate – drums
