= Inverted Image =

Jazz album

Studio album by Chris Anderson Trio
- Released: 1961
- Recorded: June 28 and November 8, 1961
- Studios: Bell Sound (New York City); Plaza Sound (New York City)
- Genre: Jazz
- Labels: Jazzland; JLP 57
- Producers: Orrin Keepnews and Ray Fowler

Chris Anderson chronology
My Romance (1960)	Inverted Image (1961)	Love Locked Out (1987)

Inverted Image is an album by jazz pianist Chris Anderson which was recorded in 1961 and released on the Jazzland label.

== Reception ==
Professional ratings
Review scores
Source	Rating
Allmusic	3/5 stars

The Allmusic site awarded the album 3 stars.

== Track listing ==
All compositions by Chris Anderson except where noted.

1. "Inverted Image" - 5:55
2. "Lullaby of the Leaves" (Bernice Petkere, Joe Young) - 4:50
3. "My Funny Valentine" (Richard Rodgers, Lorenz Hart) - 4:22
4. "See You Saturday" - 4:31
5. "Dancing in the Dark" (Arthur Schwartz, Howard Dietz) - 4:28
6. "Only One" - 3:30
7. "I Hear a Rhapsody" (George Fragos, Jack Baker, Dick Gasparre) - 5:03
8. "You'd Be So Nice to Come Home To" (Cole Porter) - 5:43

Notes

- Recorded at Bell Sound Studios in New York City on June 28, 1961 (tracks 4, 7 & 8) and at Plaza Sound Studios in New York City on November 8, 1961 (tracks 1–3, 5 & 6).

== Personnel ==
- Chris Anderson - piano
- Bill Lee - bass
- Walter Perkins - drums (tracks 1–3, 5 & 6)
- Philly Joe Jones - drums (tracks 4, 7 & 8)
