= And Then Again =

Studio album by Elvin Jones
- Released: October 1965
- Recorded: February 16 and March 18, 1965; New York City
- Genre: Jazz
- Length: 34:47
- Label: Atlantic; 1443
- Producer: Nesuhi Ertegun

Elvin Jones chronology
Dear John C. (1965)	And Then Again (1965)	Midnight Walk (1966)

And Then Again is a jazz album by drummer Elvin Jones recorded in 1965 and released on the Atlantic label.

Professional ratings
Review scores
Source	Rating
Allmusic	3.5/5 stars

It features Jones in a sextet with his brothers Thad Jones on cornet and Hank Jones on piano, along with trombonist J.J. Johnson, baritone saxophonist Charles Davis and bassist Art Davis. Pianist Don Friedman and bassist Paul Chambers replace Hank and Art on three tracks, and saxophonist Frank Wess is added.

== Track listing ==
1. "Azan" (Charles Davis) - 3:38
2. "All Deliberate Speed" (Melba Liston) - 7:35
3. "Elvin Elpus" (Liston) - 5:52
4. "Soon After" (Jodora Marshall) - 3:35
5. "Forever Summer" (Thad Jones) - 4:04
6. "Len Sirrah" (Liston) - 3:42
7. "And Then Again" (Elvin Jones) - 6:21

== Personnel ==
- Elvin Jones - drums
- Thad Jones - cornet (tracks 2, 3, 5 & 7)
- J.J. Johnson - trombone (tracks 1–6)
- Frank Wess - tenor saxophone, flute (tracks 1, 4 & 6)
- Charles Davis - baritone saxophone (tracks 1–6)
- Don Friedman - piano (tracks 1, 4 & 6)
- Hank Jones - piano (tracks 2, 3, 5 & 7)
- Paul Chambers - bass (tracks 1, 4 & 6)
- Art Davis - bass (tracks 2, 3, 5 & 7)
- Melba Liston - arranger, conductor (tracks 1–6)
