= Way Out West (Richard Davis album) =

Studio album by Richard Davis
- Released: 1980
- Recorded: June 30 and July 1, 1977; Fantasy Studios, Berkeley, California
- Genre: Jazz
- Label: Muse; MR 5180
- Producer: Ed Michel

Richard Davis chronology
Harvest (1977)	Way Out West (1980)	Fancy Free (1977)

Professional ratings
Review scores
Source	Rating
Allmusic	3/5 stars
The Rolling Stone Jazz Record Guide	2/5 stars

Way Out West is an album by bassist Richard Davis recorded in 1977 but not released on the Muse label until 1980.

== Reception ==
Allmusic awarded the album 3 stars stating "Ranging from straightahead to some funky pop, this is an interesting if not essential release from the masterful bassist".

== Track listing ==
1. "A Peace for Richard" (S. Roune) – 2:00
2. "Elephant Boy" (Bill Lee) – 6:18
3. "Do a Dog a Favor" (Robert Bowers, Pat Davis) – 3:15
4. "On the Trail" (Ferde Grofé) – 7:29
5. "I'm Old Fashioned" (Jerome Kern, Johnny Mercer) – 4:24
6. "Sienna: Waiting for the Moment" (Stanley Cowell) – 5:05
7. "Warm Canto" (Mal Waldron) – 4:11
8. "Song of Gratitude" (Consuela Lee Moorehead) – 3:13
9. "Don't You Worry 'bout a Thing" (Stevie Wonder) – 3:00

== Personnel ==
- Richard Davis – bass
- Eddie Henderson – trumpet (tracks 2, 3 & 6–9)
- Joe Henderson – tenor saxophone (tracks 2–4, 6, 8 & 9)
- Stanley Cowell – piano (tracks 2, 3 & 5–9)
- Billy Cobham – synthesizer, drums (tracks 2, 3, 5, 6 8 & 9)
- Dolly Hirota – vocals (tracks 3, 6 & 7)
