= Lloyd Harbor, New York =

Lloyd Harbor, New York Caumsett
- Village
- Incorporated Village of Lloyd Harbor
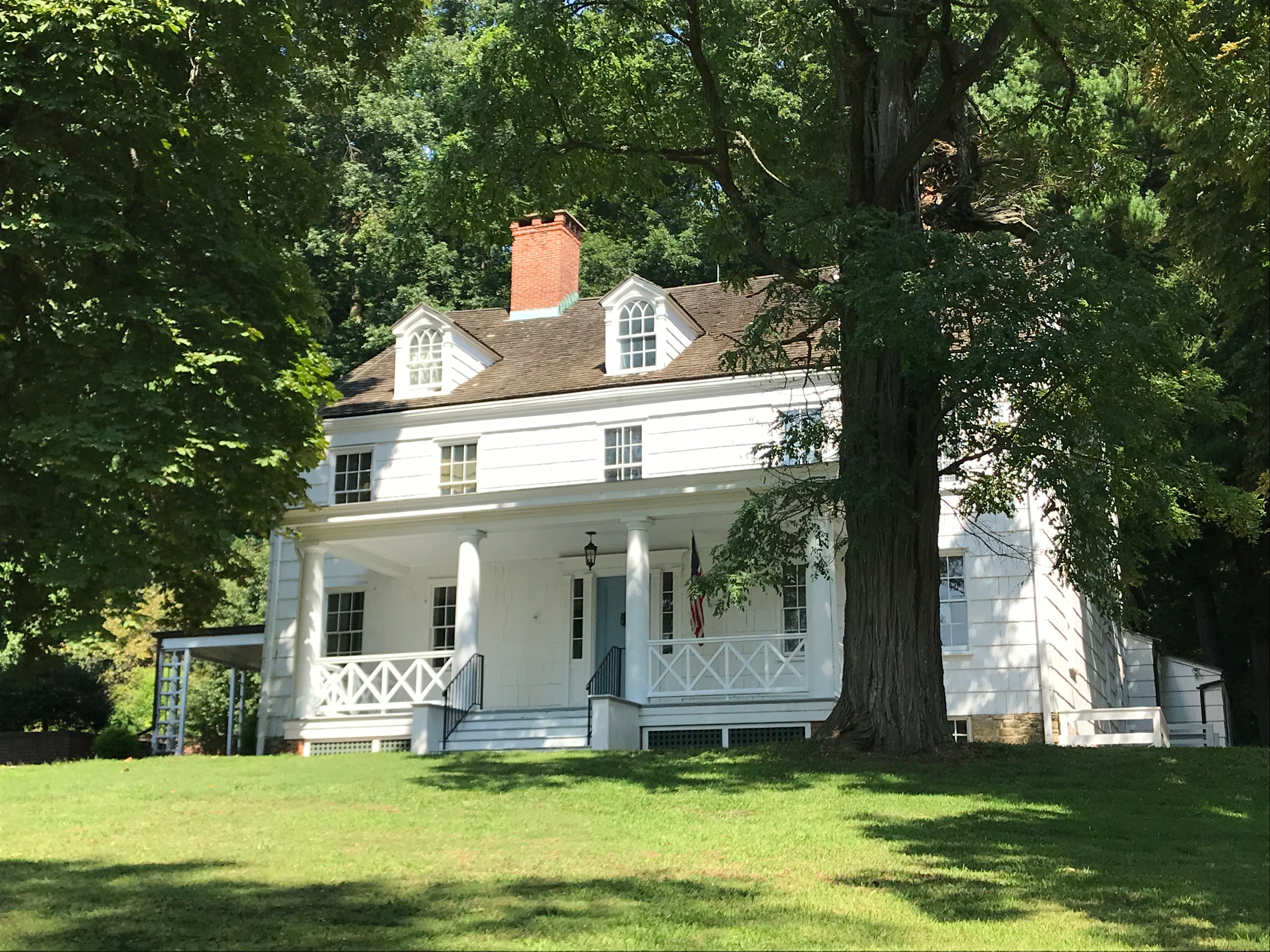
- The Joseph Lloyd Manor in Lloyd Harbor in 2018

- Location in Suffolk County and the state of New York

- Location on Long Island Location within the state of New York
- Coordinates: 40°54′36″N 73°27′25″W
- Country: United States
- State: New York
- County: Suffolk
- Town: Huntington
- Incorporated: August 16, 1926

Area
  - Total: 10.66 sq mi (27.61 km^{2})
  - Land: 9.33 sq mi (24.17 km^{2})
  - Water: 1.33 sq mi (3.44 km^{2})
- Elevation: 138 ft (42 m)

Population (2020)
  - Total: 3,571
  - Density: 382.7/sq mi (147.75/km^{2})
- Time zone: UTC-5 (Eastern (EST))
  - Summer (DST): UTC-4 (EDT)
- ZIP code: 11743
- Area codes: 631, 934
- FIPS code: 36-43005
- GNIS feature ID: 0955762
- Website: www.lloydharbor.org

Lloyd Harbor is a village in the Town of Huntington in Suffolk County, on the North Shore of Long Island, in New York, United States. As of the 2020 census, Lloyd Harbor had a population of 3,571.

== History ==
=== Early history (pre-colonization–1926) ===
In 1654, the Matinecock Native Americans sold 3,000 acres (12 km^{2}) of what is now called Lloyd Neck to English settlers from Oyster Bay. The Matinecock referred to the region as Caumsett ("place by sharp rock"). In 1676, James Lloyd acquired the neck, which was then taken over by his son Henry. Henry Lloyd farmed the land and erected a house, which still survives in Caumsett State Park. After his death in 1763, his son Joseph built the Joseph Lloyd Manor House, which he was forced to abandon by the British during the Revolutionary War. The British built several fortifications in the neck, including Fort Franklin. Henry Lloyd IV was the last Lloyd to own the estate, in 1841. In the 1880s, it became a stop for steamboats coming from New York City, bringing tourists and wealthy New Yorkers.

In 1886, Lloyd's Neck – which was then part of the town of Oyster Bay in Queens County, and was previously known as Queens Village – was set off and separated from Queens County and annexed to the town of Huntington in Suffolk County.

The 1900s ushered the era of the Long Island Gold Coast, and various wealthy families began to buy land and build seaside mansions and estates. These included William Matheson, Marshall Field III, Ronald Conklin, Harold Dimppel, Sr., Ferdinand Eberstadt and George McKesson.

==== Push for incorporation (1926) ====
In 1926 – about the time plans were being discussed to incorporate Downtown Huntington as a village or city, Lloyd Neck and West Neck became incorporated as a single municipality, which was named Lloyd Harbor; its boundaries were coterminous with those of the Lloyds Neck and West Neck school districts (since absorbed by the modern-day Cold Spring Harbor Central School District).

The village incorporated in order for its residents to govern their community more directly and successfully through home rule, in order to provide better municipal services, preserve the area's country-like setting, and better control land uses and development in the manner through which they deemed most appropriate. Furthermore, the desire to establish a municipal police department was especially noted as a reason for incorporating – in part due to an issue pertaining to bootleggers using the harbor as a haven for their rum-running operations.

Following a referendum vote on the matter of incorporating, Lloyd Harbor officially incorporated as a village on August 16, 1926.

=== Village of Lloyd Harbor (1926–present) ===
In the 1930s, the village annexed additional land from unincorporated Cold Spring Harbor to its southwest – including the estate of industrialist Walter Jennings, (at his request), after the New York Court of Appeals entered judgment in the village's favor in a lawsuit on the matter in 1934.

Robin Gibb, Charles Lindbergh, Jerry Seinfeld and Billy Joel have each lived on the Neck for a time. Currently many of these estates have been adapted for other uses. Marshall Field III's estate is now Caumsett State Historic Park, and the Conklin estate is a Roman Catholic seminary. Others have become a county park and a wildlife refuge. Charles Robertson's estate is now the Banbury Center, a small conference center of Cold Spring Harbor Laboratory.

In 1960, the Village of Lloyd Harbor opened Lloyd Harbor Village Park, located along the eastern shore of Cold Spring Harbor.

In 1969, the Long Island Lighting Company proposed locating a nuclear power plant in the community. Local opposition quickly defeated the plan, with Ferdinand Eberstadt donating his 80-acre (320,000 m^{2}) estate to the U.S. Fish and Wildlife Service to become Target Rock National Wildlife Refuge.

== Geography ==
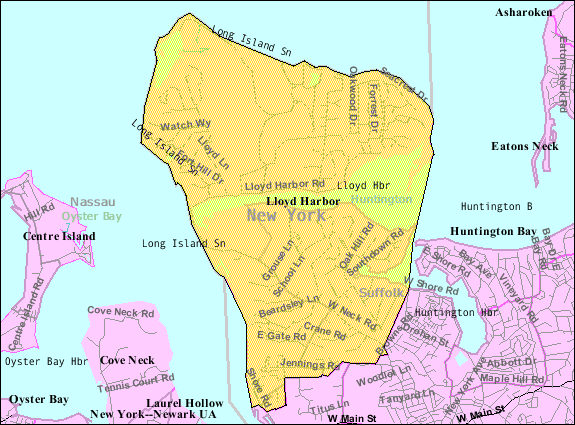
U.S. Census map of Lloyd Harbor

According to the United States Census Bureau, the village has a total area of 10.6 square miles (27 km^{2}), of which 9.4 square miles (24 km^{2}) is land and 1.3 square miles (3.4 km^{2}), or 12.03%, is water.

Lloyd Harbor is surrounded on three sides by water. It is bordered by Cold Spring Harbor and Oyster Bay to its west; the Long Island Sound to its north; and Huntington Bay to its east. Lloyd Harbor, itself, is located within the boundaries of the village, between Lloyd Neck and West Neck.

=== Geology and hydrogeology ===
The Lloyd Sand Member of the Raritan Formation is a geological unit named after Lloyd Neck (located within present-day Lloyd Harbor), where it was first discovered. Similarly, the Lloyd Aquifer – a related, confined aquifer contained within the Lloyd Sand unit – derives its name from that unit and thus, ultimately, Lloyd Neck.

Both the Lloyd Aquifer and the Lloyd Sand underly much of Long Island and parts of the Outer Barrier to its immediate south; the Lloyd Sand is also present beneath parts of New Jersey. Meanwhile, the Raritan Formation underlies much of the coastal Mid-Atlantic region of the United States, as part of the Atlantic Coastal Plain.

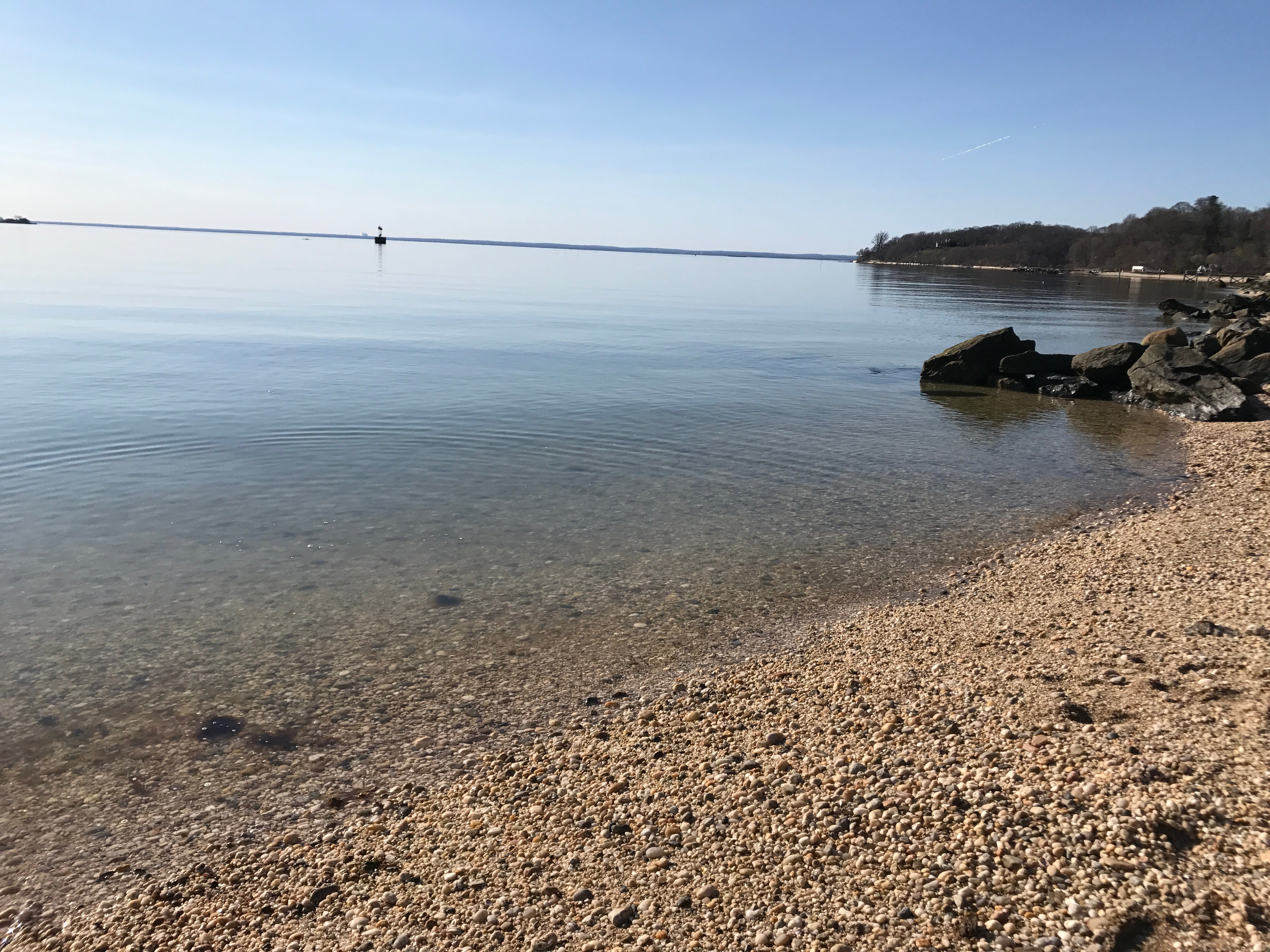
A beach in Lloyd Harbor

== Demographics ==
Historical population
Census	Pop.	Note	%±
1930	480		—
1940	603		25.6%
1950	945		56.7%
1960	2,521		166.8%
1970	3,371		33.7%
1980	3,405		1.0%
1990	3,343		−1.8%
2000	3,675		9.9%
2010	3,660		−0.4%
2020	3,571		−2.4%
U.S. Decennial Census

=== 2020 census ===
As of the 2020 census, Lloyd Harbor had a population of 3,571. The median age was 45.1 years. 24.4% of residents were under the age of 18 and 18.3% of residents were 65 years of age or older. For every 100 females there were 101.1 males, and for every 100 females age 18 and over there were 98.2 males age 18 and over.

52.1% of residents lived in urban areas, while 47.9% lived in rural areas.

There were 1,150 households in Lloyd Harbor, of which 40.8% had children under the age of 18 living in them. Of all households, 74.3% were married-couple households, 9.4% were households with a male householder and no spouse or partner present, and 13.2% were households with a female householder and no spouse or partner present. About 10.7% of all households were made up of individuals and 6.0% had someone living alone who was 65 years of age or older.

There were 1,246 housing units, of which 7.7% were vacant. The homeowner vacancy rate was 1.8% and the rental vacancy rate was 2.6%.

Racial composition as of the 2020 census
Race	Number	Percent
White	3,166	88.7%
Black or African American	11	0.3%
American Indian and Alaska Native	0	0.0%
Asian	136	3.8%
Native Hawaiian and Other Pacific Islander	0	0.0%
Some other race	27	0.8%
Two or more races	231	6.5%
Hispanic or Latino (of any race)	206	5.8%

=== 2000 census ===
As of the census of 2000, there were 3,675 people, 1,147 households, and 1,036 families residing in the village. The population density was 392.9 inhabitants per square mile (151.7/km^{2}). There were 1,188 housing units at an average density of 127.0 per square mile (49.0/km^{2}). The racial makeup of the village was 96.49% White, 0.63% African American, 0.05% Native American, 1.88% Asian, 0.22% from other races, and 0.73% from two or more races. Hispanic or Latino of any race were 2.31% of the population.

There were 1,147 households, out of which 46.4% had children under the age of 18 living with them, 85.0% were married couples living together, 3.5% had a female householder with no husband present, and 9.6% were non-families. 8.0% of all households were made up of individuals, and 4.2% had someone living alone who was 65 years of age or older. The average household size was 3.17 and the average family size was 3.33.

In the village, the population was spread out, with 31.3% under the age of 18, 4.1% from 18 to 24, 21.6% from 25 to 44, 30.8% from 45 to 64, and 12.2% who were 65 years of age or older. The median age was 41 years. For every 100 females, there were 98.0 males. For every 100 females age 18 and over, there were 98.0 males.

The median income for a household in the village was $380,411, and the median income for a family was $596,650. Males had a median income of $500,000 versus $41,167 for females. The per capita income for the village was $76,696. About 1.0% of families and 1.3% of the population were below the poverty line, including 0.4% of those under age 18 and 2.2% of those age 65 or over.

== Education ==
Lloyd Harbor is located entirely within the boundaries of (and is thus served by) the Cold Spring Harbor Central School District. Accordingly, all children who reside within the village and attend public schools go to Cold Spring Harbor's schools.

== Notable people ==
- Dee Snider, singer for Twisted Sister
- Christie Brinkley, model
- Taylor Dayne, singer
- George M. Fletcher, politician
- Robin Gibb, singer
- Billy Joel, singer and songwriter
- Angelina Jolie, actress
- Sean Hannity, political commentator
- Marshall Field III, department store heir
- John Phillips, singer, songwriter and member of Mamas and Papas
- Bijou Phillips, actress and model
- Jerry Seinfeld, comedian, actor, writer and producer
- Jupiter Hammon, author, poet, and preacher

== See also ==
- List of municipalities in New York
- Asharoken, New York
- Huntington Bay, New York
