= Remembering Me-Me =

Studio album by Clifford Jordan
- Released: 1977
- Recorded: May 18–19, 1976
- Studio: Blue Rock Studio, NYC
- Genre: Jazz
- Length: 38:52
- Label: Muse; MR 5105
- Producer: Franklin Fuentes

Clifford Jordan chronology
The Highest Mountain (1975)	Remembering Me-Me (1977)	Inward Fire (1977)

Remembering Me-Me is an album by saxophonist Clifford Jordan which was recorded in New York City in 1976 and first released on the Muse label.

== Reception ==
Professional ratings
Review scores
Source	Rating
Allmusic	4/5 stars
The Rolling Stone Jazz Record Guide	4/5 stars

The Allmusic site rated the album with 4 stars.

== Track listing ==
1. "It's Time" (Max Roach) – 7:29
2. "Powerful Paul Robeson" (Clifford Jordan, Hank D. Smith) – 5:51
3. "Symphony in Blues" (Roy Burrowes) – 6:15
4. "Ole Funny Columbine" (Jordan, J. Cridland) – 10:11
5. "Mama's Little Boy Thinks He's a Man" (Jordan) – 4:36
6. "Me-Me (Prayer to the People)" (Jordan, Smith) – 3:30

== Personnel ==
- Clifford Jordan – tenor saxophone
- Roy Burrowes – trumpet, flugelhorn
- Chris Anderson – piano, electric piano
- Wilbur Ware (tracks 1, 2, 5 & 6), Kiyoto Fujiwara (tracks 3 & 4) – bass
- George Avaloz – drums
- Hank Diamond Smith – vocals (tracks 2 & 6), percussion (track −4)
- Boo Boo Monk (tracks 2 & 4), Donna Jordan (track 4), Terri Plair (track 4) – vocals
