= Fort Franklin (New York) =

Revolutionary War British fortification on Long Island

Coordinates: 40.919°N 73.488°W

Fort Franklin was erected by the British in 1778, in present day Lloyd Harbor, New York, as part of a network of fortifications along the north shore of Long Island during the Revolutionary War, and named for Benjamin Franklin's Loyalist son, Sir William Franklin. It was raided in 1779, resulting in the capture of many of the Loyalist garrison, but not the fort itself. It was unsuccessfully attacked by French troops on July 13, 1781. At the end of the war, it became a refugee camp for Loyalists, then finally dismantled in 1783.

The site, which became known as Fort Hill, is now the location of the historic Fort Hill Estate in Lloyd's Neck.
