= My Romance (Chris Anderson album) =

Studio album by Chris Anderson Trio
- Released: 1983
- Recorded: October 12, 1960; Chicago, IL
- Genre: Jazz
- Label: Vee-Jay; RJL 2669
- Producer: Sid McCoy

Chris Anderson chronology
My Romance (1983)	Inverted Image (1961)

My Romance is an album by jazz pianist Chris Anderson which was recorded in 1960 but not released on the Vee-Jay label until 1983.

== Track listing ==
1. "Wrap Your Troubles in Dreams" (Harry Barris, Ted Koehler, Billy Moll) - 3:28
2. "So in Love" (Cole Porter) - 4:23
3. "You Stepped Out of a Dream" (Nacio Herb Brown, Gus Kahn) - 6:21
4. "Soon" (George Gershwin, Ira Gershwin) - 2:44
5. "Monica" (Bill Lee) - 2:38
6. "A Fellow Needs a Girl" (Richard Rodgers, Oscar Hammerstein II) - 3:07
7. "I Could Write a Book" (Rodgers, Lorenz Hart) - 3:50
8. "My Romance" (Rodgers, Hart) - 5:18
9. "Love Letters" (Victor Young, Edward Heyman) - 7:01

== Personnel ==
- Chris Anderson - piano
- Bill Lee - bass
- Art Taylor - drums
