= Blues One =

Studio album by Chris Anderson
- Released: 1991
- Recorded: May 18, 1991; Skyline Studio, NYC
- Genre: Jazz
- Length: 47:10
- Label: DIW; DIW 607
- Producer: Mickey Bass

Chris Anderson chronology
Love Locked Out (1987)	Blues One (1991)	Live at Bradley's (1994)

Blues One is an album by jazz pianist Chris Anderson which was recorded and released on the DIW label in 1991.

== Track listing ==
1. "The End of a Beautiful Friendship" (Donald Kahn, Stanley Styne) - 4:12
2. "Star Eyes" (Don Raye, Gene DePaul) - 7:32
3. "Someday My Prince Will Come" (Frank Churchill, Larry Morey) - 7:19
4. "Blue Bossa" (Kenny Dorham) - 6:46
5. "I Can't Get Started" (Vernon Duke, Ira Gershwin) - 7:08
6. "Blues One" (Chris Anderson) - 7:04
7. "The Summer Knows" (Michel Legrand, Alan and Marilyn Bergman) - 7:14

== Personnel ==
- Chris Anderson - piano
- Ray Drummond - bass
- Billy Higgins - drums
