= Live at the Village Vanguard (Elvin Jones album) =

Live album by Elvin Jones
- Released: 1974
- Recorded: March 20, 1968
- Venue: Village Vanguard, New York City
- Genre: Jazz
- Length: 42:12
- Label: Enja; ENJ 2306-1
- Producer: Horst Weber

Elvin Jones chronology
Midnight Walk (1966)	Live at the Village Vanguard (1974)	Live at the Village Vanguard Vol. 1 (1968)

Live at the Village Vanguard is a live album by jazz drummer Elvin Jones, recorded in 1968 at the Village Vanguard and released on the Enja label in 1974. It features Jones in a trio with tenor saxophonist George Coleman and bassist Wilbur Little. Trumpeter Hannibal Peterson appears on one track.

== Reception ==
The AllMusic review by Scott Yanow described the musicianship as "excellent and reasonably exploratory".

Professional ratings
Review scores
Source	Rating
AllMusic	3/5 stars
The Penguin Guide to Jazz Recordings	3.5/4 stars

== Track listing ==
1. "By George" (George Coleman) - 7:06
2. "Laura" (David Raksin) - 12:00
3. "Mister Jones" (Keiko Jones) - 15:06
4. "You Don't Know What Love Is" (Don Raye, Gene de Paul) - 7:02

== Personnel ==
- Elvin Jones - drums
- Hannibal Marvin Peterson - trumpet (track 3)
- George Coleman - tenor saxophone
- Wilbur Little - bass
