= Jupiter Hammon =

American writer (1711–c. 1806)

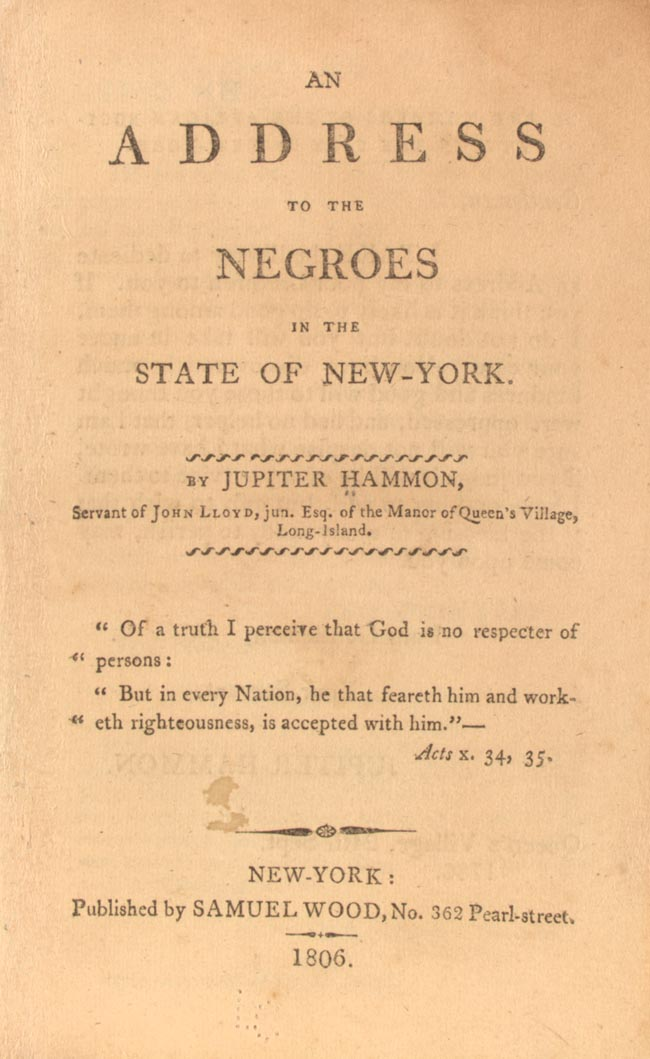
Hammon's Address to the Negroes in the State of New-York, 1806

Jupiter Hammon (October 17, 1711 – c. 1806) was an American writer who is known as a founder of African-American literature, as his poem published in 1761 in New York was the first by an African American man in North America. He subsequently published both poetry and prose. In addition, he was a preacher and a commercial clerk on Long Island, New York.

Born into slavery at the Lloyd Manor on Long Island, Hammon learned to read and write. In 1761, at nearly 50, Hammon published his first poem, "An Evening Thought: Salvation by Christ with Penitential Cries". He was the first African-American poet published in North America. Also a well-known and well-respected preacher and clerk-bookkeeper, he gained wide circulation for his poems about slavery. As a devoted Christian evangelist, Hammon used his biblical foundation to criticize the institution of slavery.

== Early life and education ==
The facts of Hammon's personal life are limited. Opium and Rose, enslaved people purchased by Henry Lloyd, are believed to have been the parents of Jupiter Hammon. They are the first enslaved people on record in the Lloyd Papers to serve the Lloyd family continually after their purchase. Born into slavery at the Lloyd Manor (at what is now Lloyd Harbor, New York), Hammon served the Lloyd family his entire life, working under four generations of the family.

The Lloyds allowed Hammon to receive a rudimentary education through the Anglican Church's Society for the Propagation of the Gospel in Foreign Parts system, likely in exchange for his cooperative attitude. Hammon's ability to read and write aided his holders in their commercial businesses; these supported institutionalized slavery. It has been argued that Hammon's goal was to take advantage of literary skills by exhibiting intellectual awareness through literature. He created literature layered with metaphors and symbols, giving him a safe means to express his feelings about slavery.

Even though Hammon was enslaved, that did not stop him from being an overachiever. Hammon's goal was to help his fellow blacks reach an "egalitarian" heaven through their good behavior here on Earth. By becoming a preacher, Hammon emphasized religious faith and encouraged slaves rather than defending slavery. Anything Jupiter wrote could not be published without the approval of his owners and if it had anything to do with Jupiter painting them out to be villains were not getting published. It was speculated that Hammon's writings were coded.

== Literary works ==
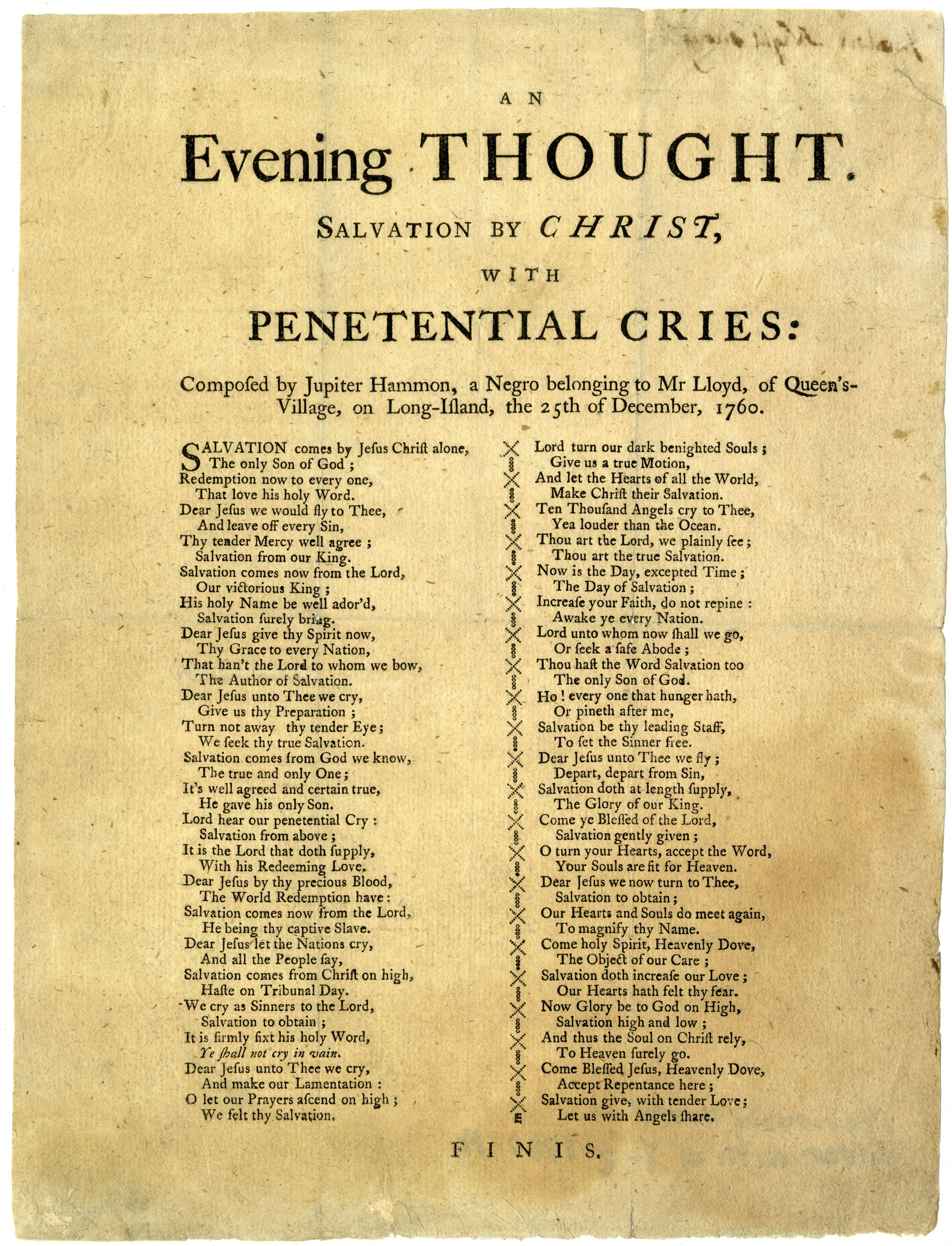
Hammon's "An Evening Thought", 1761

"An Evening Thought: Salvation by Christ, with Penitential Cries" was Jupiter Hammon's first published poem. Composed on December 25, 1760, it appeared as a broadside in 1761. The printing and publishing of this poem established Jupiter Hammon as the first published Black poet.

Eighteen years passed before his second work appeared in print, "An Address to Miss Phillis Wheatley". Hammon wrote the poem during the Revolutionary War, while Henry Lloyd had temporarily moved his household and enslaved people from Long Island to Hartford, Connecticut, to evade British forces. Phillis Wheatley, then enslaved in Massachusetts, published her first book of poetry in 1773 in London. She is recognized as the first published black female author. Hammon never met Wheatley but was a great admirer. His dedication poem to her contained twenty-one rhyming quatrains, each accompanied by a related Bible verse. Hammon believed his poem would encourage Wheatley along her Christian journey.

In 1778, Hammon published "The Kind Master and Dutiful Servant", a poetic dialogue, followed by "A Poem for Children with Thoughts on Death" in 1782. These works set the tone for Hammon's "An Address to Negros in the State of New York". At the inaugural meeting of the African Society in New York City on September 24, 1786, Hammon delivered what became known as the Hammon "Address to Negroes of the State of New-York". He was seventy-six years old and still enslaved. In his address he told the crowd, "If we should ever get to Heaven, we shall find nobody to reproach us for being black, or for being slaves." He also said that while he had no wish to be free, he did wish others, especially "the young negroes, were free".

Hammon's speech draws heavily on Christian motifs and theology, encouraging Black people to maintain their high moral standards because "being slaves on Earth had already secured their place in heaven." Scholars believe Hammon supported gradual abolition as a way to end slavery, believing that the immediate emancipation of all enslaved people would be challenging to achieve. New York Quakers who supported the abolition of slavery published Hammon's speech, and it was reprinted by several abolitionist groups, including the Pennsylvania Society for Promoting the Abolition of Slavery.

Hammon's entire body of work consists of eight publications: four poems and four prose pieces, all with religious content. "An Address to Negroes in the State of New York" was Hammon's last literary work and likely his most influential. It is believed that Jupiter Hammon died within or before the year 1806. Though his death was not recorded, Hammon was believed to be buried separately from the Lloyds on the Lloyd family property in an unmarked grave.

== Recent findings ==
Two previously unknown poems by Hammon have been discovered in recent years. In 2011, University of Texas Arlington doctoral student Julie McCown discovered the first in the Manuscripts and Archives library at Yale University. The poem, dated 1786, is described by McCown as a 'shifting point' in Hammon's worldview surrounding slavery. The second was found in 2015 by Claire Bellerjeau, a researcher investigating the Townsend family and their slaves who lived at Raynham Hall in nearby Oyster Bay.

== Works ==
- "An Evening Thought" (1761)
- "Untitled" (1770, unpublished)
- "An Address to Miss Phillis Wheatly" (1778)
- "An Essay on Slavery" (1786, unpublished)
- "An Essay on the Ten Virgins" (1779, lost work)
- "A Winter Piece" (1782)
  - "A Winter Piece" (1782) - Hammon uses the season "Winter" as a symbol for the struggles and battles that people face in life. He describes the winter as a lack of movement and darkness, creating a visual aid to help the reader understand what he actually means. Hammon implies that the struggles you go through in life could help build a better connection with God and help you grow spiritually. He emphasizes throughout this piece that keeping faith in God during times of struggle.
- "A Poem for Children with Thoughts on Death" (1782)
  - "A Poem for Children with Thoughts on Death" (1782) - In this poem, Hammon talks about life, death, and morality, speaking directly to the children. He uses this short poem to grab the attention of children, giving them advice on how it could be if you lived a good life, emphasizing that how you feel spiritually is more important than a temporary feeling. Hammon advises children to do things right when they are young and to trust God because God alone will make them wise.
- "An Evening's Improvement" (1783)
  - "An Evening's Improvement" (1783) - Specifically, in this poem, Hammon speaks about how you should use your time, and he uses the evening to describe it. He emphasizes that evening time is almost like a time to reflect, a time to think about the actions you took throughout the day. This is another one of his spiritual growth pieces with some self-growth as well. He claims that in your free time, you should talk to God, think about your actions, and think about how you can make yourself a better individual. He claims that doing this can lead to living a more meaningful life and preparation for life after death.
- "The Kind Master and Dutiful Servant" (1783)
  - "The Kind Master and Dutiful Servant" (1783) - In this poem, Hammon speaks about the relationships between servants and masters. Hinting that a master treating a servant fairly could encourage loyalty and thorough service, and the servants respond to being treated like this by actually doing their job and being appreciative. At a certain point in this poem, Hammon wants to get across that the way you treat someone, regardless of the circumstances, could create peace and tighter bonds. He even speaks on why servants acted the way they acted, all because of how they were treated by their masters. The main goal of the poem was to let readers know that God rewards both kindness and faithfulness, and everybody should treat each other with the same respect.
- "An Address to the Negroes in the State of New-York "(1787)
  - "An Address to the Negroes in the State of New-York" (1787) - This particular piece came out when Hammon was 75 years old. Throughout this piece he emphasizes avoiding sins and the spiritual state of people. He argues enslaved people's job was to follow orders and be honest. The piece mainly pays attention to freedom. He advocates the ability to know right form wrong and also humanity for the enslaved.

== See also ==
- List of slaves
