= Harvest (Richard Davis album) =

Studio album by Richard Davis
- Released: 1979
- Recorded: May 3 & 16, 1977; CI Recording, New York City
- Genre: Jazz
- Length: 35:30
- Label: Muse; MR 5115
- Producer: Frederick Seibert

Richard Davis chronology
As One (1975)	Harvest (1979)	Way Out West (1977)

Professional ratings
Review scores
Source	Rating
Allmusic	3/5 stars
DownBeat	3.5/5 stars
The Rolling Stone Jazz Record Guide	3/5 stars

Harvest is an album by bassist Richard Davis recorded in 1977 but not released on the Muse label until 1979.

== Reception ==
Allmusic awarded the album 3 stars calling it "Most interesting listening for the adventurous jazz lover".

== Track listing ==
All compositions by Bill Lee and Richard Davis except as indicated

1. "Forest Flower" (Charles Lloyd) - 4:58
2. "This Masquerade" (Leon Russell) - 6:30
3. "Half Pass" - 4:13
4. "Three Flowers" (McCoy Tyner) - 1:55
5. "Windflower" (Sara Casey) - 7:19
6. "Passion Flower" (Billy Strayhorn) - 4:19
7. "A Third Away" - 4:33
8. "Take the "A" Train" (Strayhorn) - 3:10
9. "Forest Flower (Reprise)" (Lloyd) - 1:57

== Personnel ==
- Richard Davis - bass
- James Spaulding - alto saxophone (tracks 5–8)
- Ted Dunbar - guitar (tracks 1–3, 5 & 6)
- Consuela Moore - piano (tracks 1–6 & 9)
- Bill Lee - bass (tracks 1–6 & 8)
- Billy Hart (tracks 5–8), Freddie Waits (tracks 1–3, 5 & 6) - drums
