= Epistrophy & Now's the Time =

Live album by Richard Davis
- Released: 1972
- Recorded: September 7, 1972; Jazz City, New York City
- Genre: Jazz
- Length: 62:50; CD reissue with bonus track
- Label: Muse; MR 5002
- Producer: Don Schlitten

Richard Davis chronology
The Philosophy of the Spiritual (1971)	Epistrophy & Now's the Time (1972)	Dealin' (1974)

Professional ratings
Review scores
Source	Rating
Allmusic	4/5 stars
The Rolling Stone Jazz Record Guide	3/5 stars

Epistrophy & Now's the Time (reissued as Epistrophy) is a live album by bassist Richard Davis recorded in 1972 and released on the Muse label. It was the second album released on the label.

== Reception ==
Allmusic awarded the album 4 stars with a review stating: "These very unpredictable renditions reward repeated listenings".

== Track listing ==
All compositions by Richard Davis except as indicated

1. "Epistrophy" (Kenny Clarke, Thelonious Monk) - 22:56
2. "Now's the Time" (Charlie Parker) - 22:31
3. "Highest Mountain" - 17:31 Bonus track on CD reissue

== Personnel ==
- Richard Davis - bass
- Marvin Peterson - trumpet
- Clifford Jordan - tenor saxophone
- Joe Bonner - piano
- Freddie Waits - drums
