= Body and Soul (Archie Shepp and Richard Davis album) =

Live album by Archie Shepp and Richard Davis
- Released: 1991
- Recorded: October 1, 1989
- Venue: Club Cantare, Boston, MA
- Genre: Jazz
- Length: 54:13
- Label: Enja; 7007
- Producer: Horst Weber

Archie Shepp chronology
Lover Man (1988)	Body and Soul (1991)	Octiminus (1989)

Richard Davis chronology
One for Frederick (1989)	Body and Soul (1991)	I Remember Clifford (1992)

Body and Soul is a live album by saxophonist Archie Shepp and bassist Richard Davis which was recorded in Boston in 1989 and released on the Enja label in 1991.

== Reception ==
Professional ratings
Review scores
Source	Rating
AllMusic	4/5 stars

The AllMusic review by Thom Jurek called it "a major addition to the saxophonist's catalog" and said "This duet date from 1990 demonstrates the deep blues feeling and technical mastery Archie Shepp has on the tenor saxophone ... this set is one of Shepp's most enjoyable ever. The reasons are myriad, but it is in large part due to the fluid, loping bass of Richard Davis". In The Chicago Tribune, Jack Fuller said "This recording is first-rate".

== Track listing ==
1. "Things Ain't What They Used to Be" (Mercer Ellington, Ted Persons) – 12:36
2. "Body and Soul" (Johnny Green, Frank Eyton, Edward Heyman, Robert Sour) – 17:17
3. "Pannonica" (Thelonious Monk) – 7:21
4. "'Round About Midnight" (Monk) – 17:03

== Personnel ==
- Archie Shepp – tenor saxophone
- Richard Davis – bass
