= Chris Anderson (pianist) =

American jazz pianist (1926–2008)

- Born: February 26, 1926; Chicago, Illinois, U.S.
- Died: February 4, 2008 (aged 81) Manhattan, New York
- Genre: Jazz
- Occupation: Musician
- Instrument: Piano
- Years active: 1945–2000

Chris Anderson (February 26, 1926 – February 4, 2008) was an American jazz pianist who was active in Chicago and New York City from the 1940s to the 1960s. He played with many prominent jazz figures of the time, including Charlie Parker, though he is perhaps best known today for his influence on Herbie Hancock.

== Early life ==
Chris Anderson was born in Chicago on February 26, 1926. He was born with limited vision and osteogenesis imperfecta. By age 20, he was completely blind due to cataracts. As a child, he was captivated by the harmony he heard while watching Hollywood films. A self-taught pianist, he played in South Side, Chicago blues bars while in high school. He was first introduced to the music of Nat King Cole, Art Tatum, and Duke Ellington while working in a record store.

== Career ==
As the house pianist in a number of Chicago clubs from the mid 1940s through 1960, Anderson played with prominent jazz figures including Sonny Stitt, Charlie Parker, Howard McGhee, Clifford Brown, Von Freeman, Sonny Rollins, Gene Ammons, and Stan Getz.

Despite the respect of his peers, Anderson had difficulty finding work or popular acclaim due in large part to his disabilities. In October 1959, after breaking his leg twice in less than a year and struggling financially, some of Anderson’s fellow musicians arranged a benefit concert with promoter Joe Segal at the Preview lounge in Chicago.

In 1961, Anderson toured briefly with Dinah Washington in New York City where he would remain for the rest of his career. He worked intermittently due to illness, suffering multiple broken hips. During this time, he was regular solo performer at pianist Barry Harris's annual concerts, and still played at a number of New York clubs including the Jazz Gallery, Bradley’s and the Village Vanguard.

Anderson recorded only a few albums in the 1960s which were well-regarded but not widely circulated. After a hiatus, he returned to recording in the 1980s through to early 2000s.

Anderson died of a stroke on February 4, 2008, in Manhattan, at the age of 81.

== Legacy ==
Anderson is perhaps best known as the mentor of jazz musician Herbie Hancock, who praised him as "a master of harmony and sensitivity."

== Discography ==
=== As leader/co-leader ===
Year recorded	Title	Label	Personnel/Notes
1960	My Romance	Vee-Jay	Trio, with Bill Lee (bass), Art Taylor (drums)
1961	Inverted Image	Jazzland	Most tracks trio, with Bill Lee (bass), Walter Perkins (drums); some tracks trio with Lee (bass), Philly Joe Jones (drums)
1987	Love Locked Out	Mapleshade	Solo piano; Anderson also sings on two tracks
1991	Blues One	DIW	Trio, with Ray Drummond (bass), Billy Higgins (drums)
1994	Live at Bradley's	Alsut	Some tracks solo piano; some tracks trio, with Ray Drummond (bass), Frank Gant; one track trio, with Drummond (bass), Billy Higgins (drums); in concert
1996	Solo Ballads	Alsut	Solo piano
1997	None but the Lonely Heart	Naim	Duo, with Charlie Haden (bass)
1998	You Don't Know What Love Is	Naim	Quartet, with Sabina Sciubba (vocals), David Williams (bass), Billy Higgins (drums)
1998	From the Heart	Naim	Solo piano
2001	Solo Ballads Two	Alsut	Solo piano

=== As sideman ===
With Clifford Jordan

- Remembering Me-Me (Muse, 1977)
- The Mellow Side of Clifford Jordan (Mapleshade, 1997)

With Charlie Parker

- An Evening at Home with the Bird (Savoy, 1961)
- One Night in Chicago (Savoy, 1980)

With others

- Sun Ra, Sun Ra Sextet at the Village Vanguard (Rounder, 1993)
- Frank Strozier, Long Night (Jazzland, 1961)
