= As One (Richard Davis album) =

Live album by Richard Davis
- Released: 1976
- Recorded: October 19 & 26, 1975; The Fugue, New York City
- Genre: Jazz
- Length: 42:52
- Label: Muse; MR 5093
- Producer: Elliot Meadow

Richard Davis chronology
Dealin' (1974)	As One (1976)	Harvest (1977)

Professional ratings
Review scores
Source	Rating
Allmusic	3/5 stars
The Rolling Stone Jazz Record Guide	3/5 stars

As One is a live album by bassist Richard Davis recorded in 1975 and released on the Muse label.

== Reception ==
Allmusic awarded the album 3 stars.

== Track listing ==
All compositions by Richard Davis except as indicated

1. "Blue Bossa" (Kenny Dorham) - 7:42
2. "All Blues" (Miles Davis) - 13:29
3. "Blue Monk" (Thelonious Monk) - 6:35
4. "Speak Low" (Kurt Weill, Ogden Nash) - 5:27
5. "Fuge 'N" - 9:39

== Personnel ==
- Richard Davis - bass
- Jill McManus - piano
