= The Bassist: Homage to Diversity =

Studio album by Richard Davis with John Hicks
- Released: May 1, 2001
- Recorded: November 17, 1999
- Studio: King #2 Studio, Tokyo
- Genre: Jazz
- Length: 51:09
- Label: King Records/Seven Seas
- Producer: Susumu Morikawa

Richard Davis chronology
Total Package (1998)	The Bassist: Homage to Diversity (2001)	So in Love (2001)

The Bassist: Homage to Diversity is an album by bassist Richard Davis with pianist John Hicks released on the Palmetto label in 2001.

== Reception ==
Professional ratings
Review scores
Source	Rating
Allmusic	3/5 stars
The Penguin Guide to Jazz Recordings	3/4 stars

The AllMusic review by David R. Adler stated "Master jazz bassist Richard Davis teams up with the esteemed John Hicks on piano for a round of sensitive duets. With a rapport that is truly rare, the two play music that spans genres from classical to bebop to spirituals and vintage blues".

In JazzTimes, Bill Bennett commented: "The subtitle to this duets collection refers to the repertoire, the range of material and the people and concepts they represent, but it as readily refers to the range of Davis’ arco technique. Davis and the bow are very much in evidence here, matched with the great John Hicks and the piano".

On All About Jazz, Craig Jolley said "As the primary soloist Davis plays arco (bowed) bass on most tunes. In contrast to the generally high-energy feel of his previous records he concentrates mainly on melodic variation. The deep, rich sonority of his instrument becomes a primary message. This CD can also be seen as Davis' personal summary of twentieth century American music with emphasis on soulfulness. Pianist John Hicks accompanies Davis with sensitivity and restraint and contributes concise, apt solos".

The authors of The Penguin Guide to Jazz wrote: "Somewhat reminiscent of Charlie Haden's essays in Americana, this lovely set mixes gospel, blues and jazz with a gentle confidence... Davis's 'diversity' isn't a bland eclecticism but a rooted expression of a life spent at the service of creative music."

== Track listing ==
1. "Come Sunday/Warm Valley" (Duke Ellington) – 5:14
2. "Simone" (Frank Foster) – 8:01
3. "Estate (Summer)" (Bruno Martino) – 7:46
4. "A Flower Is a Lovesome Thing" (Billy Strayhorn) – 4:37
5. "Eccles Sonata" (Henry Eccles) – 4:33
6. "Lift Every Voice and Sing" (John Rosamond Johnson, James Weldon Johnson) – 3:33
7. "Go Down Moses" (Traditional) – 2:34
8. "Little Benny" (Charlie Parker) – 5:19
9. "Skylark" (Hoagy Carmichael, Johnny Mercer) – 4:27
10. "C.C. Rider (Traditional) – 5:05

== Personnel ==
- Richard Davis - bass
- John Hicks - piano
