= Midnight Walk =

Studio album by Elvin Jones
- Released: 1967
- Recorded: March 23–24, 1966; New York City
- Genre: Jazz
- Length: 36:00
- Label: Atlantic; SD 1485
- Producer: Arif Mardin

Elvin Jones chronology
And Then Again (1965)	Midnight Walk (1967)	Heavy Sounds (1967)

Midnight Walk is a jazz album by drummer Elvin Jones recorded in 1966 and released on the Atlantic label. It features Jones in a quintet with his brother Thad on trumpet, tenor saxophonist Hank Mobley, pianist Abdullah Ibrahim and bassist Don Moore.

Professional ratings
Review scores
Source	Rating
Allmusic	4/5 stars

== Track listing ==
1. "Midnight Walk" (Arif Mardin) - 3:30
2. "Lycra Too?" (Stephen James) - 4:50
3. "Tintiyana" (Dollar Brand) - 5:45
4. "H.M. on F.M." (Hank Mobley) - 5:00
5. "Cross-Purpose" (Thad Jones) - 6:00
6. "All of Us" (Thad Jones) - 6:25
7. "Juggler" (Elvin Jones) - 4:30
- Recorded in New York City on March 23 (tracks 2–4 & 7) & March 24 (tracks 1, 5 & 6), 1966

== Personnel ==
- Elvin Jones - drums
- Thad Jones - trumpet
- Hank Mobley - tenor saxophone
- Dollar Brand - piano
- Stephen James - electric piano (track 2)
- Don Moore - bass
- George Abend - percussion (tracks 1, 5 & 6)
