= The Philosophy of the Spiritual =

Studio album by Richard Davis
- Released: 1971
- Recorded: November 1971; New York City, U.S.
- Genre: Jazz
- Length: 37:41
- Label: Cobblestone; CST 9003
- Producer: Larry Fallon

Richard Davis chronology
Muses for Richard Davis (1970)	The Philosophy of the Spiritual (1971)	Epistrophy & Now's the Time (1972)

Professional ratings
Review scores
Source	Rating
Allmusic	4.5/5 stars

The Philosophy of the Spiritual is an album by bassist Richard Davis recorded in 1971 and released on the Cobblestone label. The album was reissued in 1975 on the Muse label as With Understanding.

== Reception ==
Allmusic awarded the album 4½ stars.

== Track listing ==
All compositions by Bill Lee except as indicated

1. "Dear Old Stockholm" (Traditional) - 5:36
2. "Monica" - 4:05
3. "Oh My God" (Nadi Koma) - 9:27
4. "The Rabbi" - 7:23
5. "Baby Sweets" - 6:18
6. "Juan Valdez" - 5:02

== Personnel ==
- Richard Davis - bass
- Chick Corea - piano
- Bill Lee - bass
- Sam Brown - guitar
- Sonny Brown - drums
- Frankie Dunlop - percussion
