= Muses for Richard Davis =

Studio album by Richard Davis
- Released: 1970
- Recorded: December 9, 1969
- Studio: MPS Studio, Villingen, East Germany
- Genre: Jazz
- Label: MPS; MR 5002
- Producer: Joachim-Ernst Berendt

Richard Davis chronology
Heavy Sounds (1967)	Muses for Richard Davis (1970)	The Philosophy of the Spiritual (1971)

Professional ratings
Review scores
Source	Rating
Allmusic	3.5/5 stars
DownBeat	3.5/5 stars
The Rolling Stone Jazz Record Guide	4/5 stars

Muses for Richard Davis is the debut album by bassist Richard Davis recorded in 1969 and released on the German MPS label.

== Reception ==
Allmusic awarded the album 3½ stars with a review stating, "It's a meeting of post-bop titans who not only know how to play, but also how to play together".

== Track listing ==
1. "Milktrain" (Jimmy Knepper) - 6:03
2. "A Child is Born" (Thad Jones) - 5:00
3. "Softly, as in a Morning Sunrise" (Sigmund Romberg, Oscar Hammerstein II) - 9:25
4. "What Is It?" (Pepper Adams) - 7:00
5. "Muses for Richard Davis" (Roland Hanna) - 5:00
6. "Toe Tail Moon" (Jerry Dodgion) - 4:55

== Personnel ==
- Richard Davis - bass
- Freddie Hubbard - trumpet
- Jimmy Knepper - trombone
- Jerry Dodgion - alto saxophone
- Eddie Daniels - tenor saxophone
- Pepper Adams - baritone saxophone
- Roland Hanna - piano
- Louis Hayes - drums
