= Dealin' =

Studio album by Richard Davis
- Released: 1974
- Recorded: September 14, 1973; RCA Studios, New York City
- Genre: Jazz
- Length: 35:30
- Label: Muse; MR 5027
- Producer: Don Schlitten

Richard Davis chronology
Epistrophy & Now's the Time (1972)	Dealin' (1974)	As One (1975)

Professional ratings
Review scores
Source	Rating
Allmusic	3/5 stars

Dealin' is an album by bassist Richard Davis recorded in 1973 and released on the Muse label.

== Reception ==
Allmusic awarded the album 3 stars.

== Track listing ==
All compositions by Richard Davis except as indicated

1. "What'd You Say" – 6:25
2. "Dealin'" – 6:07
3. "Julie's Rag Doll" – 5:40
4. "Sweet'n" – 3:57
5. "Sorta" – 3:15
6. "Blues for Now" – 11:06

== Personnel ==
- Richard Davis – bass, electric bass, vocals
- Marvin Peterson – trumpet, tambourine, cowbell
- Clifford Jordan – tenor saxophone, cowbell
- David Spinozza – guitar
- Paul Griffin – piano, electric piano, clavinet
- Freddie Waits – drums
