= Fancy Free (Richard Davis album) =

Studio album by Richard Davis
- Released: 1977
- Recorded: June 30 & July 1, 1977
- Studio: Fantasy Studios, Berkeley, California
- Genre: Jazz
- Label: Galaxy; GXY-5102
- Producer: Ed Michel

Richard Davis chronology
Way Out West (1977)	Fancy Free (1977)	Divine Gemini (1978)

Professional ratings
Review scores
Source	Rating
Allmusic	3/5 stars
The Rolling Stone Jazz Record Guide	2/5 stars

Fancy Free is an album by bassist Richard Davis recorded in 1977 and released on the Galaxy label.

== Reception ==
Allmusic awarded the album 3 stars stating "an advanced and mostly straightahead effort".

== Track listing ==
1. "The Wine of May" (Loonis McGlohon) – 5:21
2. "Silver's Serenade" (Horace Silver) – 9:46
3. "Emily" (Johnny Mandel, Johnny Mercer) – 4:52
4. "Nardis" (Miles Davis) – 4:22
5. "I Still Love You, Baby" (P. Davis, Dolly Hirota) – 5:42
6. "Fancy Free" (Donald Byrd) – 7:52

== Personnel ==
- Richard Davis – bass
- Eddie Henderson – trumpet, flugelhorn (tracks 1, 2 & 4–6)
- Joe Henderson – tenor saxophone
- Stanley Cowell – piano, electric piano
- Billy Cobham – drums
- Dolly Hirota – vocals (track 5)
- Bill Lee – arranger, conductor
