= Mamas & Papas =

British baby goods retail chain

- Type: Private limited company
- Industry: Retail
- Founded: 1981; 45 years ago
- Headquarters: Huddersfield, West Yorkshire
- Key people: David Scacchetti; Luisa Scacchetti; Derek Lovelock; Jonathon Fitzgerald
- Products: Pushchairs, buggies, car seats, toys, nursery furniture
- Revenue: £133.7 million (2016)
- Number of employees: c. 1,000
- Parent: BlueGem Capital Partners
- Website: www.mamasandpapas.com

Mamas & Papas is a UK-based nursery brand and manufacturer supplying prams, pushchairs, baby products, furniture and maternity wear. It was established in Huddersfield in 1981 by David and Luisa Scacchetti, both of Italian ancestry, whose initial aim was to bring Italian design to the UK baby buggy market. They started the business with a range of coloured corduroy prams imported from Italy. They sold through one local shop of their own and through supplying other stores, until deciding to become a retail brand in 1998. For most of its existence, the business was privately owned.

By 2011, Mamas & Papas was described as the "UK's bestselling nursery brand". In 2014, the business embarked on cost-cutting associated with a Company Voluntary Arrangement (CVA). Store closures were considered but were avoided by the CVA.

The private equity firm BlueGem Capital Partners took a majority share in Mamas & Papas in summer 2014, joining a portfolio that includes Liberty and Jack Wills. The company returned to profitability in 2015.

In 2016, the rejuvenated retailer opened a 5,000 square feet (460 m^{2}) flagship store at Westfield London.

Mamas & Papas was placed into administration on Friday 8 November 2019 and was immediately bought back by other firms controlled by Bluegem Capital, its private equity owner.
