= Richard Davis (bassist) =

American double-bassist (1930–2023)

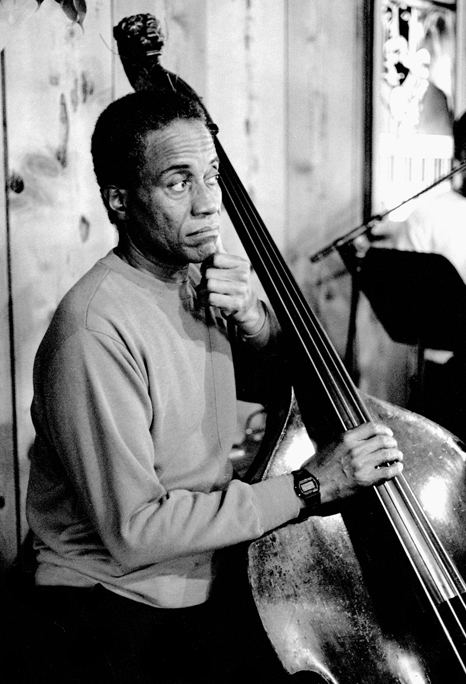
- Davis in 1987

Background information
- Born: April 15, 1930; Chicago, Illinois, U.S.
- Died: September 6, 2023 (aged 93) Madison, Wisconsin, U.S.
- Genres: Jazz; pop; classical
- Occupation: Musician
- Instrument: Double bass
- Labels: Muse; Palmetto; Marge
- Formerly of: Creative Construction Company; The Thad Jones/Mel Lewis Orchestra
- Website: www.richarddavis.org

Richard Davis (April 15, 1930 – September 6, 2023) was an American jazz bassist. Among his best-known contributions to the albums of others are Eric Dolphy's Out to Lunch!, Andrew Hill's Point of Departure, and Van Morrison's Astral Weeks, of which critic Greil Marcus wrote (in The Rolling Stone Illustrated History of Rock and Roll), "Richard Davis provided the greatest bass ever heard on a rock album."

== Early life ==
Davis was born in Chicago, Illinois, on April 15, 1930. His mother died during childbirth, and he was raised by Robert and Elmora Johnson. Davis gravitated towards playing the bass, and began his musical career singing bass in his family's vocal trio. He studied double bass in high school under Walter Dyett, and was a member of the Youth Orchestra of Greater Chicago, playing in the orchestra's first performance at Chicago's Orchestra Hall on November 14, 1947. After high school, he studied double bass with Rudolf Fahsbender of the Chicago Symphony Orchestra while attending VanderCook College of Music.

== Career ==
After college, Davis performed in dance bands. In the early 1950s, Richard Davis met and played with Sonny Blount (globally celebrated later as the other-worldly orchestral revolutionary Sun Ra) and spent a year with the artistically and commercially successful pianist Ahmad Jamal’s trio. Ahmad Jamal boosted Davis’ career from the start. The connections he made led him to pianist Don Shirley. In 1954, he and Shirley moved to New York City and performed together until 1956, when Davis began playing with the Sauter-Finegan Orchestra. In 1957, he became part of Sarah Vaughan's rhythm section, touring and recording with her until 1960.

During the 1960s, Davis was in demand in a variety of musical circles. He worked with many of the small jazz groups of the time, including those led by Eric Dolphy, Jaki Byard, Booker Ervin, Andrew Hill, Elvin Jones, and Cal Tjader. From 1966 to 1972, he was a member of The Thad Jones/Mel Lewis Orchestra. He has also played with Don Sebesky, Oliver Nelson, Frank Sinatra, Miles Davis, Dexter Gordon, Joe Henderson and Ahmad Jamal. Davis became a prolific contributor to numerous groundbreaking jazz projects. Notably, he played on Eric Dolphy's avant-garde masterpiece Out to Lunch! with its bold shapes and structures, and on teenage drums prodigy Tony Williams’ album debut, Life Time. Eric Dolphy assisted Davis in his ability to expand his versatility in relation to playing jazz music. Although Dolphy's music was different from the one he had previously been working on with Sarah Vaughan he knew he was in the right place.

In 1964 Davis partnered with Andrew Hill's rhythmically intricate Point of Departure. As Richard Davis continued developing he took a lot of inspiration from Mingus . In 1968 with Van Morrison's Astral Weeks, Davis served as the de facto musical director, leading the improvisational ensemble through the album's creation. Producer Lewis Merenstein described Davis as “the soul of the album.” His bass lines on Astral Weeks were lauded by critics for their emotional depth, propelling the album to its status as a classic.

Davis recorded with pop and rock musicians in the 1970s, appearing on Laura Nyro's Smile and Bruce Springsteen's Greetings From Asbury Park, N.J. and Born to Run. During his career he performed classical music with conductors Igor Stravinsky, Leonard Bernstein, Pierre Boulez, Leopold Stokowski, and Gunther Schuller.

== Career highlights and collaborations ==
In 1964 Richard Davis featured on Tony Williams's debut album Life Time, showcasing his innovative approach. He played on Frank Sinatra's Watertown (1969), Paul Simon's Something So Right (1973), and on several classic tracks from 1975, including Bruce Springsteen's Meeting Across the River, Laura Nyro's Smile, and Janis Ian's At Seventeen. Beyond his contributions to pop and rock, Davis was a founding member and regular participant in the Thad Jones/Mel Lewis Orchestra from 1966 to 1972. He performed as part of the New York Bass Violin Choir led by Bill Lee.

In the late 1980s he established the Madison chapter of the Institute for the Healing of Racism and held meetings at his home. In the 1990s he also participated in a series of post bop trio recordings with the pianist John Hicks and the drummer Tatsuya Nakamura. In May 2000 he released a CD that was recorded in Japan called The Bassist which paid homage to Diversity (King Records). His second CD with King Records So In Love was also later released. Davis always continued to play and record semi-regularly with him performing with The Bassist which paid homage to Diversity (Palmetto) in 2001. And in March 2009 he participated at the Anderson's Chicago club, the Velvet Lounge, from March 18–22 celebrating legend Fred Anderson turning 80 on March 22.

== Teaching ==
In 1977, Davis accepted a teaching position as Professor of Bass (European Classical and Jazz), Jazz History and combo improvisation at the University of Wisconsin-Madison. Davis had a desire to mentor and inspire future generations. Richard Davis points to a number of older bassists as influencing his understanding of the bass. He says, “I listened to Jimmy Blanton, Oscar Pettiford, all those old guys, Milton Hinton. I wanted to find out what they were doing. I didn't want to play like them, but that's where it came from. Along with the fact that he was ready to ease the pressures of being a freelance musician.

His nearly 40-year tenure at the university emphasized classical bass, jazz history, and improvisation. In 1993 Davis founded the Richard Davis Foundation for Young Bassists to help support young artists develop music. In 1998, he created the Retention Action Project (R.A.P.) focused on multicultural differences. Davis also initiated a chapter of the "Institute for the Healing of Racism" in Madison to further diversity awareness efforts.

He retired from the university in 2016.

== Death ==
Davis died on September 6, 2023, after two years in hospice care, at the age of 93.

== Honors ==
Over his lifetime, Davis received numerous awards based on his playing and commitment towards empowering future generations. He was named Best Bassist by DownBeat magazine's International Critics’ Poll from 1967 to 1974. He won the Hilldale Award for distinguished teaching presented to him by Chancellor Donna Shalala. In 1998 he got an honorary doctorate of Humane Letters from Edgewood College, Madison. In 2000 he received the Manfred E. Swarsensky Humanitarian Award from the Rotary Club of Madison.

== Awards and honors ==
- Best Bassist, Downbeat International Critics' Poll (1967–74)
- NEA Jazz Master (2014)

== Discography ==
- Heavy Sounds (Impulse!, 1967) with Elvin Jones
- Muses for Richard Davis (MPS, 1969)
- The Philosophy of the Spiritual (Cobblestone, 1971)
- Epistrophy & Now's the Time (Muse, 1972)
- Dealin' (Muse, 1973)
- As One (Muse, 1976)
- Fancy Free (Galaxy, 1977)
- Divine Gemini (SteepleChase, 1978) with Walt Dickerson
- Harvest (Muse, 1977 [1979])
- Way Out West (Muse, 1977 [1980])
- Tenderness (SteepleChase, 1977 [1985]) with Walt Dickerson
- Persia My Dear (DIW, 1987)
- Body and Soul (Enja, 1989 [1991]) with Archie Shepp
- The Bassist: Homage to Diversity (Palmetto, 2001)
