= Odetta discography =

- Studio albums: 18
- Live albums: 8
- Compilation albums: 11
- Tribute albums: 2

Odetta's discography is large and diverse, covering over 50 years and many record labels.

** denotes Grammy nomination. *** denotes Grammy Winner

== Studio albums ==
- 1954 The Tin Angel (with Larry Mohr)
- 1956 Odetta Sings Ballads and Blues Tradition TLP1010
- 1957 At the Gate of Horn Tradition TLP1025
- 1959 My Eyes Have Seen Vanguard VSD2046
- 1960 Ballad For Americans and Other American Ballads Vanguard VSD2057
- 1960 Christmas Spirituals Vanguard VSD2079
- 1962 Odetta and The Blues Riverside RLP9417
- 1962 Sometimes I Feel Like Cryin' RCA Victor LSP-2573
- 1963 One Grain of Sand Vanguard VSD2153
- 1963 Odetta Sings Folk Songs RCA Victor LSP-2643
- 1964 It's a Mighty World RCA Victor LSP-2792
- 1964 Odetta Sings of Many Things RCA Victor LSP-2923
- 1965 Odetta Sings Dylan RCA Victor LSP-3324
- 1967 Odetta FTS3014
- 1970 Odetta Sings Polydor
- 1999 Blues Everywhere I Go ** MC0038
- 2001 Looking For a Home

== Live albums ==
- 1960 Odetta at Carnegie Hall Vanguard VSD2072
- 1962 Town Hall Vanguard VSD2109
- 1966 Odetta in Japan RCA LSP3457
- 1985 Live in Mestre Venezia 1985 Caligola Records

Odetta at the Best of Harlem

Live album by Odetta
- Released: 1976
- Recorded: The Best of Harlem, Stockholm, Sweden
- Genre: Folk
- Label: Four Leaf Clover
- Producer: Lars Samuelson

Odetta chronology
The Essential Odetta (1973)	Odetta at the Best of Harlem (1976)	Movin' It On (1987)

- 1976 It's Impossible, a.k.a. Odetta at the Best of Harlem - songs included:
1. "Michael Row the Boat"
2. "Cool Water" (Bob Nolan)
3. "Until It's Time for You to Go"
4. "It's Impossible"
- 1987 Movin' It On RQ101
- 1998 To Ella
  - Also released as Odetta & American Folk Pioneer
- 2002 Women in (E)motion
- 2005 Gonna Let It Shine **

== Compilation albums ==
- 1963 Odetta
- 1967 The Best of Odetta
- 1968 Odetta Sings The Blues Riverside RS 3007
- 1973 The Essential Odetta (live)
  - This album is a combination of the Carnegie Hall & Town Hall albums
- 1994 The Best of Odetta: Ballads and Blues
- 1999 The Best of the Vanguard Years
- 2000 Livin' with the Blues
- 2000 Absolutely the Best
- 2002 The Tradition Masters
- 2003 American Folk Pioneer (This album is a reissue of To Ella)
- 2006 Best of the M.C. Records Years 1999-2005
- 2007 Vanguard Visionaries

== Appearances ==
- 1959 Newport Folk Festival
- 1960 Belafonte Returns to Carnegie Hall (Harry Belafonte)
  - Tracks: "I've Been Driving On Bald Mountain", "Water Boy", "There's a hole in the bucket"
- 1960 Folk Festival At Newport Vol. 2
- 1962 Folk Song and Minstrelsy
- 1963 Jimmy Witherspoon
  - Track: duet on "Lonesome Road."
- 1964 We Shall Overcome: The March on Washington
  - Tracks: "Freedom Trilogy": "I'm on My Way", "Come and Go with Me" & "Oh Freedom".
- 1968 A Tribute To Woodie Guthrie Vol. 1
  - Track: "This Land Is Your Land/Narration" (with Arlo Guthrie & co. and Will Geer)
- 1969 The Original Hits Of Right Now Plus Some Heavies From The Motion Picture "Easy Rider"
  - Track: "Ballad of Easy Rider"
- 1970 A Tribute To Woodie Guthrie Vol. 2, "Pastures of Plenty"
- 1972 Greatest Songs of Woody Guthrie
- 1976 Aftertones (Janis Ian)
- 1987 Songs of the Working People
- 1987 Greatest Folksingers of the 'Sixties
  - Track: "John Henry"
- 1988 Greenwich Folk Festival
- 1993 Other Voices, Other Rooms (Nanci Griffith) **
- 1993 Rare, Live and Classic (Joan Baez)
- 1994 Freedom is a Constant Struggle
- 1995 Scenes from a Scene: Greenwich Village
- 1995 A Folksinger's Christmas
- 1995 Assassins in the Kingdom (Michael Jonathan)
- 1996 At Home/Around the World (David Amram & Friends)
- 1997 Mojo Club: V.4 Light My Fire
- 1998 Other Voices TOO (Nanci Griffith)
- 1998 Miriam McKeba-Odetta (Harry Belafonte)
- 1998 Giants of Folk: Leadbelly/Guthrie/Odetta
- 1998 Where Have All the Flowers Gone
- 1998 Original Seeds: Songs that Inspired Nick Cave
- 1998 Folk Hits of the 1960s
- 2000 Sounds of a Better World
- 2000 The Ballad of Ramblin' Jack **
- 2000 Hyacinths and Thistles (the 6ths)
  - Track: "Waltzing Me All The Way Home"
- 2000 Women of Silverworlf
- 2000 Rollin' Into Memphis: Songs of John Hiatt
- 2000 Gospel
- 2000 Route 50: Driving New Routes
- 2000 Queens of the Blues
- 2001 Roger McGuinn: Treasures from the Folk Den **
- 2001 Washington Square Memories
- 2001 Jazz Ladies
- 2001 Say Yo' Business
- 2001 Philadelphia Folk Festival: 40th Anniversary
- 2001 Say It Out Loud
- 2001 Folk Music
- 2001 Sounds of a Better World (Small Voices Calling)
- 2002 Blues Treasures
- 2002 This Land Is Your Land
- 2002 Soul & Inspiration
- 2003 Broken Hearted Blues
- 2003 Blues Had a Baby & It's Rock 'n Roll
- 2003 In the Wind
- 2003 Beginner's Guide to Folk Music
- 2003 Seeds: The Songs of Pete Seeger
- 2003 Respond II
- 2003 The Prestige Blues Sampler
- 2003 Corner of Bleeker and Blues
- 2003 Best of M.C. Records 1996-2002
- 2003 Let Freedom Sing
- 2003 Best of Kerrville Festival
- 2003 Patriot's Songbook
- 2003 Blue Box of Blues
- 2003 Shout Sister Shout: Rosetta Tharpe Tribute
- 2004 Baby Don't Tear My Clothes (James Cotton)
- 2004 Ladies Man (Pinetop Perkins) **
- 2004 My Country Awake: Freedom Compilation
- 2004 Eric Bibb & Friends
- 2004 Salute to the Blues: Listening in the Bottle
- 2005 Folk: The Life, Times & Music Series

== Tribute Albums ==
- Beautiful Star: The Songs Of Odetta, by Wears The Trousers Records
- Requiem for a Heavyweight (Tribute to Odetta), by Sista Jean & CB
