= The Best of the Vanguard Years (Odetta album) =

Greatest hits album by Odetta
- Released: 1999
- Genre: Folk, blues
- Length: 68:41
- Label: Vanguard
- Producer: Tom Vickers

Odetta chronology
Blues Everywhere I Go (1999)	The Best of the Vanguard Years (1999)	Livin' with the Blues (2000)

Professional ratings
Review scores
Source	Rating
Allmusic	3.5/5 stars

The Best of the Vanguard Years is a compilation album by American folk singer Odetta, originally released in 1999.

The focus of the material is the music Odetta performed when recording for the Vanguard label. The recordings come from three albums, One Grain of Sand, My Eyes Have Seen and Odetta at Carnegie Hall. The last 4 selections are previously unreleased tracks from Vanguard vaults. The recording dates of previously unreleased tracks were not reported in the liner notes.

== Track listing ==
All songs Traditional unless otherwise noted.

1. "Midnight Special" – 3:21 (from One Grain of Sand, 1963)
2. "Cotton Fields" (Lead Belly) – 3:21 (from One Grain of Sand, 1963)
3. "Special Delivery Blues" – 2:37 (from One Grain of Sand, 1963)
4. "Rambling Round Your City" (Woody Guthrie) – 4:02 (from One Grain of Sand, 1963)
5. "Cool Water" (Bob Nolan) – 3:04 (from One Grain of Sand, 1963)
6. "Down on Me" – 2:55 (from My Eyes Have Seen, 1959)
7. "I've Been Driving on Bald Mountain/Water Boy" (Robinson) – 6:53 (from My Eyes Have Seen)
8. "Saro Jane" – 2:46 (from My Eyes Have Seen, 1959)
9. "Battle Hymn of the Republic" (Julia Ward Howe) – 3:51 (from My Eyes Have Seen, 1959)
10. "If I Had a Hammer" (Lee Hays, Pete Seeger) – 1:53 (from Odetta at Carnegie Hall, 1960)
11. "Joshua Fit the Battle of Jericho" – 2:20 (from Odetta at Carnegie Hall, 1960)
12. "Meetin' at the Building" – 2:35 (from Odetta at Carnegie Hall, 1960)
13. "No More Auction Block" – 2:17 (from Odetta at Carnegie Hall, 1960)
14. "Sometimes I Feel Like a Motherless Child" – 3:22 (from Odetta at Carnegie Hall, 1960)
15. "Spoken Introduction: He Had a Long Chain On" (Jimmy Driftwood) – 6:22 (from Odetta at Carnegie Hall, 1960)
16. "Another Man Done Gone" (Vera Hall, Alan Lomax, John Lomax, Ruby Pickens Tartt) – 2:31 (from Odetta at Carnegie Hall, 1960)
17. "He's Got the Whole World in His Hands" – 2:05 (from Odetta at Carnegie Hall, 1960)
18. "Make Me a Pallet on the Floor" – 3:21 (from previously unreleased, 19__)
19. "Livin' with the Blues" – 3:39 (from previously unreleased, 19__)
20. "Nobody Knows You When You're Down and Out" (Cox) – 2:12 (from previously unreleased, 19__)
21. "House of the Rising Sun" – 3:14 (from previously unreleased, 19__)

== Personnel ==
- Odetta – vocals, guitar
- Bill Lee – bass
- Milt Okun – conductor

== Production notes ==
- Samuel Charters – compilation liner notes
- David Gahr – photography
- Jeff Zaraya – engineer
