= Odetta Sings the Blues =

Studio album by Odetta
- Released: 1968
- Genre: Folk, blues
- Label: Riverside; RS 3007
- Producer: Orrin Keepnews

Odetta chronology
The Best of Odetta (1967)	Odetta Sings the Blues (1968)	Odetta Sings (1970)

Odetta Sings the Blues is an album by American folk singer Odetta, released in 1968. It is a reissue of the 1962 Riverside release Odetta and the Blues.

Professional ratings
Review scores
Source	Rating
Allmusic	4.5/5 stars

== Track listing ==
=== Side one ===
1. "Hard, Oh Lord" (4:05)
2. "Believe I'll Go" (3:03)
3. "Oh, Papa" (3:16)
4. "How Long Blues" (2:06)
5. "Hogan's Alley" (2:09)
6. "Leavin' This Mornin'" (2:46)

=== Side two ===
1. "Oh My Babe" (4:19)
2. "Yonder Come the Blues" (2:48)
3. "Make Me a Pallet on Your Floor" (3:47)
4. "Weeping Willow Blues" (2:35)
5. "Go Down Sunshine" (2:17)
6. "Nobody Knows You When You're Down and Out" (2:19)

== Personnel ==
- Odetta – vocals, guitar
- Buck Clayton – trumpet
- Vic Dickenson – trombone
- Herb Hall – clarinet
- Dick Wellstood – piano
- Ahmed Abdul-Malik – bass
- "Shep" Shepherd – drums
