= The Essential Odetta =

Live album by Odetta
- Released: 1973
- Recorded: Carnegie Hall and The Town Hall, New York, NY
- Genre: Folk, blues
- Length: 62:19
- Label: Vanguard

Odetta chronology
Odetta Sings (1970)	The Essential Odetta (1973)	Odetta at the Best of Harlem (1987)

The Essential Odetta is a live album by American folk singer Odetta, originally released on LP in 1973.

The original double-LP The Essential Odetta included the live performances At Town Hall and At Carnegie Hall, but the CD version of that release omits ten songs from the original total of both LPs (eight from Town Hall and two from Carnegie Hall). Tracks 1–13 on the CD are from the Carnegie Hall concert and tracks 14–21 are from the Town Hall concert. The CD liner notes incorrectly state the entire CD was recorded at Carnegie Hall.

Professional ratings
Review scores
Source	Rating
Allmusic	4.5/5 stars

== Track listing ==
All songs Traditional unless otherwise noted.

1. "If I Had a Hammer" (Pete Seeger, Lee Hays) – 1:55
2. "When I Was a Young Girl" – 2:51
3. "Gallows Tree (Gallows Pole)" – 2:40
4. "God's A-Gonna Cut You Down" – 2:12
5. "John Riley" (Neff) – 3:24
6. "Joshua Fought the Battle of Jericho" – 2:23
7. "All the Pretty Little Horses" – 3:03
8. "Prettiest Train" – 3:25
9. "Meeting at the Building" – 2:35
10. "No More Auction Block" – 2:18
11. "Hold On" – 2:42
12. "Sometimes I Feel Like a Motherless Child" – 3:22
13. "Ain't No Grave Can Hold My Body Down" – 3:19
14. "Santy Anno" – 2:34
15. "Another Man Done Gone" (Hall, Lomax, Lomax, Ruby Pickens Tartt) – 2:31
16. "He Had a Long Chain On" (Driftwood) – 6:23
17. "He's Got the Whole World in His Hands" – 2:05
18. "Take This Hammer" – 3:47
19. "Ox Driver Song" – 3:06
20. "What Month Was Jesus Born In?" – 2:21
21. "Timber" (Gary, Gray, White) – 3:23

== Personnel ==
- Odetta – vocals, guitar
- Bill Lee – bass
