= Livin' with the Blues =

Compilation album by Odetta
- Released: 2000
- Genre: Folk, blues
- Length: 59:49
- Label: Vanguard
- Producer: Tom Vickers (compilation)

Odetta chronology
The Best of the Vanguard Years (1999)	Livin' with the Blues (2000)	Absolutely the Best (2000)

Professional ratings
Review scores
Source	Rating
AllMusic	4.5/5 stars

Livin' with the Blues is a compilation album by American folk singer Odetta, originally released in 2000.

The focus of the material are the songs Odetta performed when recording for the Vanguard label. Most of them are taken from the albums Odetta at Town Hall, My Eyes Have Seen, and One Grain of Sand. There are 4 selections (1, 3-5) that were previously unreleased until they were published in the compilation released the year prior, The Best of The Vanguard Years, 1999. This compilation has 4 new, previously unreleased selections (selections 2, 6-8). The recording dates of previously unreleased tracks were not reported in the liner notes.

== Track listing ==
All songs Traditional unless otherwise noted.

1. "Make Me a Pallet on the Floor" – 3:25 (from The Best of The Vanguard Years, 1999)
2. "Mean and Evil" – 2:24 (previously unreleased, 196_)
3. "Livin' With the Blues" – 3:42 (from The Best of The Vanguard Years, 1999)
4. "Nobody Knows You When You're Down and Out" (Cox) – 2:15 (from The Best of The Vanguard Years, 1999)
5. "House of the Rising Sun" – 3:18 (from The Best of The Vanguard Years, 1999)
6. "Empty Pocket Blues" – 2:24 (previously unreleased, 196_)
7. "Fare Thee Well" – 4:22 (previously unreleased, 196_)
8. "Rosie" – 2:28 (previously unreleased, 196_)
9. "Special Delivery Blues" – 2:41 (from One Grain Of Sand, 1963)
10. "Down on Me" – 2:59 (from My Eyes Have Seen, 1959)
11. "Another Man Done Gone" (Hall, Alan Lomax, Lomax, Tartt) – 2:34 (from Odetta at Town Hall, 1962)
12. "Jumpin' Judy" – 2:30 (from My Eyes Have Seen, 1959)
13. "Timber" – 3:27 (from Odetta at Town Hall, 1962)
14. "Rambler Gambler" – 3:21 (from One Grain Of Sand, 1963)
15. "Sail Away Ladies" – 2:45 (from One Grain Of Sand, 1963)
16. "Midnight Special" – 3:25 (from One Grain Of Sand, 1963)
17. "Rambling Round Your City" (Woody Guthrie) – 4:04 (from One Grain Of Sand, 1963)
18. "Bald Headed Woman" – 2:23 (from My Eyes Have Seen, 1959)
19. "Ain't No Grave" – 2:22 (from One Grain Of Sand, 1963)
20. "Roll on Buddy" – 3:00 (from One Grain Of Sand, 1963)

== Personnel ==
- Odetta – vocals, guitar
- Bill Lee – bass
- Milt Okun – choir conductor
