= Gallows Pole (disambiguation) =

The Gallows Pole is an alternative title for the folk song "The Maid Freed from the Gallows"

Gallows pole or The Gallows Pole may refer to:

- The horizontal beam of the gallows
- The Gallows Pole (TV series)
- Covers of The Gallows Pole by various artists:
  - On Led Zeppelin III
  - On Twelve-String Guitar by Fred Gerlach
  - A 1994 single by Page and Plant
- The Gallows Pole, a 2017 novel by Ben Myers
