= Looking for a Home =

Looking for a Home may refer to:

- Looking for a Home (film), a 2006 short film
- Looking for a Home (album), a 2001 album by American folk singer Odetta
