= McEnery =

McEnery is a surname. Notable people with the surname include:

- David McEnery (1914–2002), American musician
- Jeff McEnery (born 1984), Canadian comedian
- John McEnery (born 1943), English actor and writer
- John McEnery (1833–1891), American politician
- Kate McEnery (born 1981), English actor
- Peter McEnery (born 1940), English actor
- Ruth McEnery Stuart (1849–1917), American writer
- Samuel D. McEnery (1837–1910), American politician
- Tom McEnery (born 1945), American businessman and writer
