= Christmas Spirituals =

Studio album by Odetta
- Released: 1960
- Recorded: Carnegie Hall
- Genre: Spirituals, Gospel, Christmas
- Length: 29:06
- Label: Vanguard

Odetta chronology
Odetta at Carnegie Hall (1960)	Christmas Spirituals (1960)	Odetta and The Blues (1962)

Alternative cover

Professional ratings
Review scores
Source	Rating
Allmusic	4.5/5 stars

Christmas Spirituals is the name of two albums recorded by the American folk singer Odetta. The first was released in 1960 on Vanguard Records. The second, a new recording of mostly the same songs, produced by Rachel Faro at White Crowe Audio in Burlington, Vermont, was originally released in 1987 on Alcazar Records and was reissued digitally in 2007 on Ashé Records. Both albums have Bill Lee, Spike Lee's father on double bass. The cover of the second Christmas Spirituals album, by the artist Coleen Patterson, depicts a Black Madonna by the River Jordan with the Three Kings in attendance. Odetta said that these songs were traditional spirituals that emerged from the sufferings of slavery as a catharsis for the terrible wrongs that were committed.

== 1960 track listing ==
1. "Virgin Mary Had One Son" – 2:44
2. "Somebody's Talking About Jesus" – 2:49
3. "Ain't That A-Rocking" – 2:04
4. "Mary Had A Baby" – 1:47
5. "Go Tell It On The Mountain" – 2:07
6. "Beautiful Star" – 2:42
7. "Poor Little Jesus" – 2:23
8. "Shout For Joy" – 1:42
9. "Oh, Jerusalem" – 1:27
10. "Rise Up Shepherd And Follow" – 1:49
11. "If Anybody Asks You" – 2:35
12. "What Month Was Jesus Born In?" – 2:04
13. "Children, Go Where I Send Thee" – 6:59

== 1987 track listing ==
All songs traditional unless otherwise noted.

1. "Rise up, Shepherd, and Follow" – 1:45
2. "What Month Was Jesus Born In?" – 2:25
3. "Mary Had a Baby" – 1:52
4. "Somebody Talking 'Bout Jesus" – 2:05
5. "Virgin Mary Had One Son" – 3:08
6. "Go Tell It on the Mountain" – 2:01
7. "Shout for Joy" – 2:31
8. "Poor Little Jesus" – 1:56
9. "O Jerusalem" (with new lyrics by Rachel Faro) – 2:51
10. "Ain't That A-Rockin'" – 3:20
11. "If Anybody Asks You" (Odetta Gordon) – 2:00
12. "Beautiful Star" (Gordon) – 2:54
13. "Children Go Where I Send Thee" – 2:45

== Personnel ==
- Odetta – vocals, guitar
- Bill Lee – double bass
- Lincoln Goines * – bass guitar
- Jeff Salisbury * – percussion, drums
- Carol Steele * – percussion
- Helge Sasse * – executive producer

(* denotes 1987 personnel)
