= Avery Robinson =

American classical composer

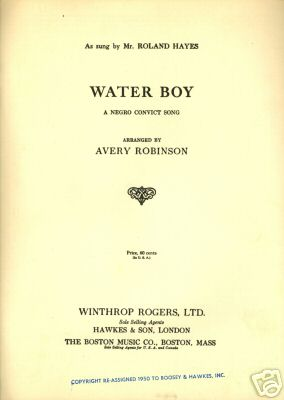
Cover of Robinson's "Water Boy", published 1922

Avery Robinson (January 21, 1878 – May 11, 1965) was an American classical composer who worked with, among others, Roland Hayes and Paul Robeson.

== Biography ==
Avery Robinson was born on January 21, 1878, in Louisville, Kentucky. His father was a local mill owner there. After graduating from MIT, Avery returned to Louisville to work for his father and for another mill owner, W. E. Chess. In 1907 he married Chess's daughter Mary, who would later found the Mary Chess Company, a perfume manufacturer. In 1909 their daughter Carley was born.

In 1920 Robinson left Louisville for London where he was employed as treasurer to the Royal Philharmonic Society. While there his daughter attended the newly founded Montessori School, and later studied musical composition with Nadia Boulanger.

After returning to the United States Avery was employed by the Mary Chess Company. Avery Robinson died in Pittsfield, Mass. on May 11, 1965.

== Works ==
Pieces composed by (or in part by) Robinson include:

- "Waterboy"
- "I've Been Driving on Bald Mountain"
