= The Tradition Masters =

Compilation album by Odetta
- Released: September 3, 2002
- Genre: Folk, blues
- Label: Tradition
- Producer: Tom Vickers (compilation)

Odetta chronology
| Looking for a Home (2001) | The Tradition Masters (2002) | Women in (E)motion (2002) |

Professional ratings
Review scores
| Source | Rating |
|---|---|
| AllMusic | 4/5 stars |

The Tradition Masters is an album by American folk singer Odetta, released in 2002.

The title refers to the label for whom Odetta recorded her first two solo releases. The songs she recorded during that time period have received multiple releases in various configurations. This two-disc compilation re-issues both Odetta Sings Ballads and Blues and At the Gate of Horn.

The early Everest LP compilation (1963) of the Tradition recordings, Odetta, used tracks from both albums as well as The Tin Angel. Another compilation, Absolutely the Best, focuses on the same master tapes, but does not include both complete albums. The Best of Odetta: Ballads and Blues uses tracks from the same two albums, including 18 tracks compared to this set's thirty-one.

The songwriting credits for these traditional folk songs vary widely from one compilation to another.

== Track listing ==
All songs Traditional unless otherwise noted.

1. "Santy Anno" (Alan Lomax, John Lomax, Traditional) – 1:53
2. "If I Had a Ribbon Bow" (Prince, Singer) – 2:40
3. "Muleskinner Blues" (Jimmie Rodgers) – 2:49
4. "Another Man Done Gone" – 2:09
5. "Shame and Scandal" – 2:21
6. "Jack o' Diamonds" (Alan Lomax, John Lomax, Traditional) – 3:13
7. "'Buked and Scorned" – 2:38
8. "Easy Rider (Lomax, Lomax, Traditional) – 5:04
9. "Joshua" – 1:51
10. "Hound Dog" – 3:48
11. "Glory, Glory" – 2:10
12. "Alabama Bound" (Lomax, Lomax, Traditional) – 1:40
13. "Been in the Pen" – 2:30
14. "Deep Blue Sea" – 2:59
15. "God's Gonna Cut You Down" – 1:49
16. "Spiritual Trilogy Medley: Oh Freedom/Come and Go With Me/I'm on My Way" – 6:04
17. "Gallows Tree (Gallows Pole)" – 2:50
18. "Lowlands" – 2:34
19. "The Fox" – 1:47
20. "Maybe She Go" – 1:45
21. "Midnight Special" – 2:34
22. "Deep River" – 2:58
23. "Chilly Winds" – 2:41
24. "Greensleeves" – 2:48
25. "Devilish Mary" – 1:50
26. "Take This Hammer" – 3:25
27. "He's Got the Whole World in His Hands" – 1:51
28. "Sail Away Ladies" – 2:20
29. "Lass of the Low Country" – 4:31
30. "Timber" – 3:09
31. "Pretty Horses" – 2:59

== Personnel ==
- Odetta – vocals, guitar
- Bill Lee – bass

== Production notes ==
- Remastering by Marco Marinangeli
