= Absolutely the Best (Odetta album) =

Greatest hits album by Odetta
- Released: 2000
- Genre: Folk, blues
- Label: Fuel 2000

Odetta chronology
Livin' With the Blues (2000)	Absolutely the Best (2000)	Looking for a Home (2001)

Professional ratings
Review scores
Source	Rating
Allmusic	3/5 stars

Absolutely the Best is a compilation album by American folk singer Odetta, originally released in 2000.

The focus of the material are the songs Odetta performed when recording for the Tradition label — 11 tracks from Odetta Sings Ballads and Blues and seven from At the Gate of Horn.

== Track listing ==
All songs Traditional unless otherwise noted.

1. "Gallows Tree (Gallows Pole)" – 2:50
2. "Joshua" – 1:51
3. "Chilly Winds" – 2:40
4. "He's Got the Whole World in His Hands" – 1:53
5. "Take This Hammer" (Huddie Ledbetter) – 3:30
6. "Muleskinner Blues" (Jimmie Rodgers) – 2:51
7. "Another Man Done Gone" (Vera Hall, Alan Lomax, John Lomax, Ruby Pickens Tartt) – 2:09
8. "The Midnight Special" – 2:34
9. "Alabama Bound" (Lomax, Lomax) – 1:42
10. "God's Gonna Cut You Down" – 1:48
11. "Glory, Glory" – 2:10
12. "Easy Rider" (Ledbetter) – 5:04
13. "Jack o' Diamonds" – 3:13
14. "Shame and Scandal" – 2:20
15. "'Buked and Scorned" – 2:38
16. "Lowlands" – 2:36
17. "Pretty Horses" – 2:59
18. Spiritual Trilogy: "Oh, Freedom", "Come and Go With Me", "I'm on My Way" – 6:06

== Personnel ==
- Odetta – vocals, guitar
- Bill Lee – bass
- Milt Okun – choir conductor
