= Water boy =

Someone who brings water to workers/players

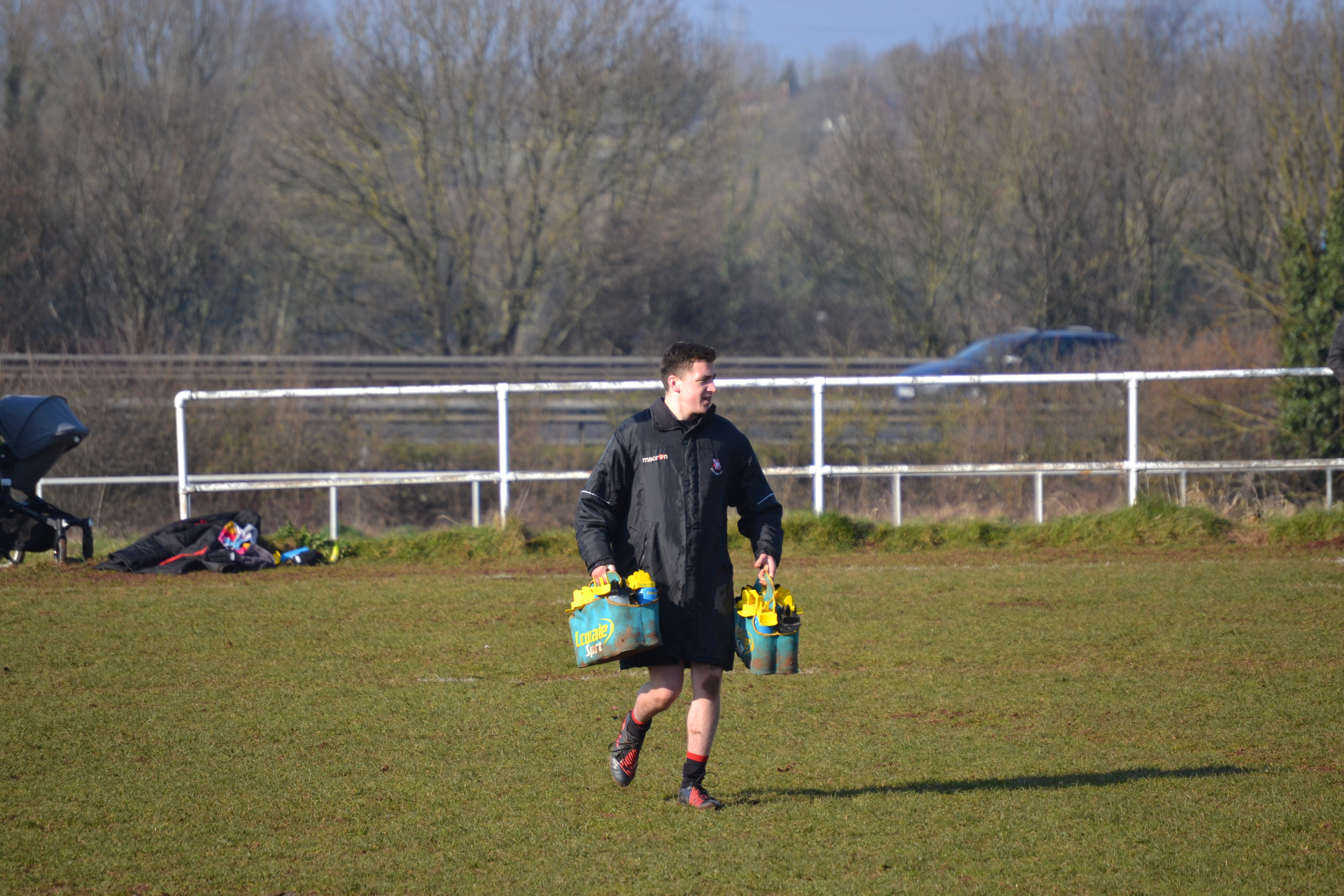
An association rugby water boy carrying two six-packs of water bottles to refresh the players.Pete Atherton of the Mighty Gordano RFC, Caswell Lane

In the United States, a water boy or water girl (sometimes spelled waterboy or watergirl) was someone who worked in the field, providing water to farmworkers in the 19th and early 20th centuries. Today, the name is given to those who work on the sidelines at sports events to provide water for athletes. The phrase has also been used to describe diminutive figures who serve another team or person in the business and political worlds, in a slightly derogatory manner (ex. "Bill is the CEO's water boy").

The position has a long history in athletics. In the 1869 Princeton vs. Rutgers football game, one of the earliest American football games, an unnamed water boy was documented giving aid to a Rutgers player.

Several notable people served as water boys, among which being President Herbert Hoover, who was the Stanford Cardinal football's first water boy.

== History ==
Although the term in modern American usage is now associated with sports, traditionally a water boy was a boy employed in farming or industry to provide water for farmworkers or machinery. On cotton plantations, just as in modern manual harvesting or picking, the water carrier was in constant demand. This is documented in the folk song "Waterboy", "Water boy, where are you hidin'?", which is only the best known of many folk and plantation water-call songs.

Early agricultural machinery also needed a water boy to supply water for cooling. The introduction of steam threshing engines required large amounts of water to produce steam, and steam threshing engine teams would employ water boys to go from farm to farm with the engine team. This probably was behind the name "boy" on Waterloo Boy tractors from 1896, later products of Deere and Company, as Waterloo Gasoline engines had recently introduced water pumps to replace the traditional farm water boy.

The railroads also employed water boys.

In India, the water boy, pani-wallah or bhisti, was an occupation. The title character in Gunga Din (poem 1892, film 1939) is a water boy.

== See also ==
- Batboy in baseball
