= Vanguard Visionaries =

The Vanguard Visionaries series is a collection of artist sampler albums released by Vanguard Records to celebrate the company's 60th anniversary.

Vanguard Records had a high-profile during the 1960s folk revival for its catalogue of recordings by many pivotal folk and blues artists such as Joan Baez, Doc Watson, Odetta, John Fahey, and many others. The label first released a series of artist samplers from the 1960s and early-'70s era, later releasing more contemporary artists.

== Releases ==
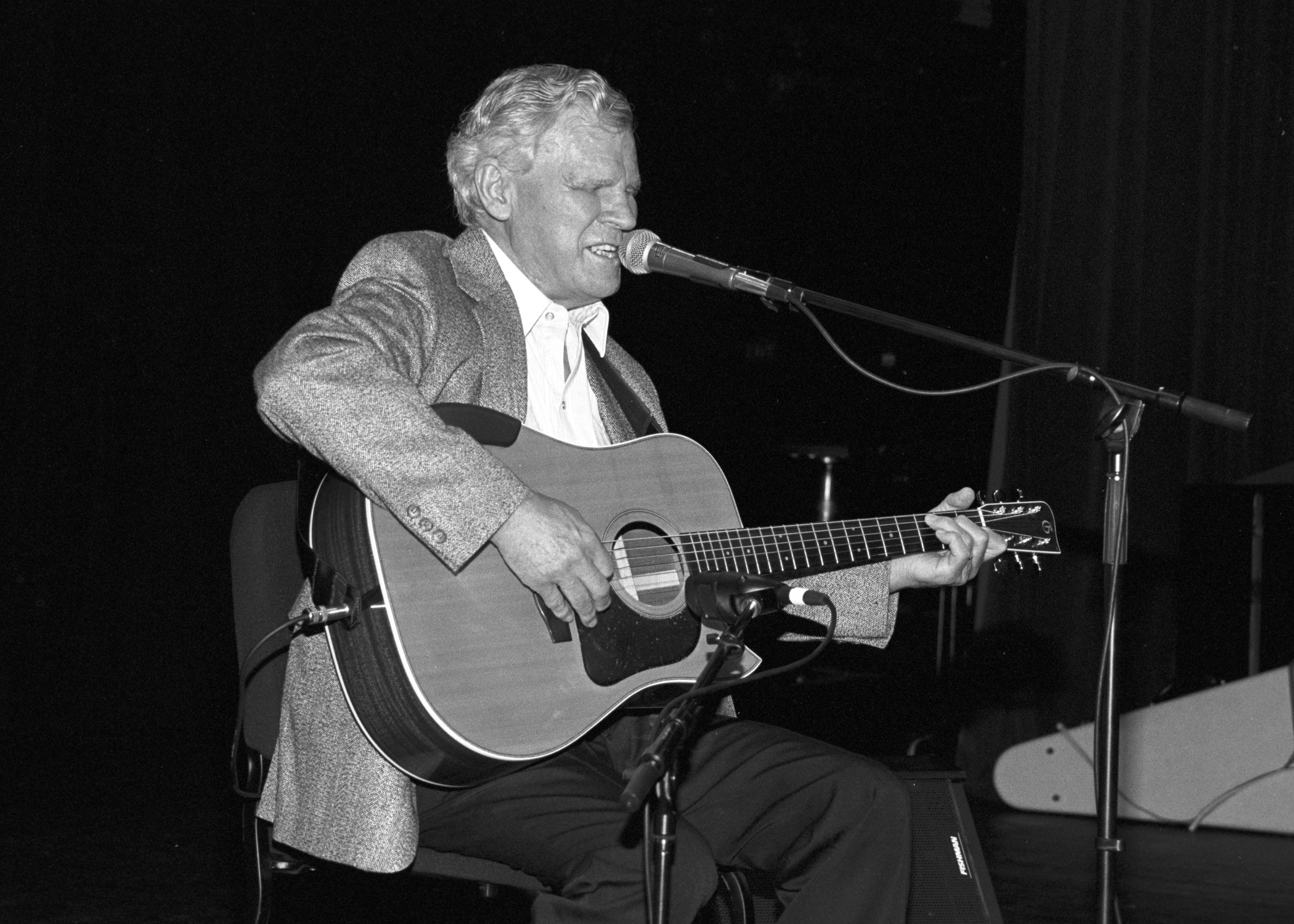
- Doc Watson in 1994
  Vanguard Visionaries (Alison Brown album)
- Vanguard Visionaries (Sandy Bull album)
- Vanguard Visionaries (Ramblin' Jack Elliott album)
- Vanguard Visionaries (John Fahey album)
- Vanguard Visionaries (Odetta album)
- Vanguard Visionaries (Doc Watson album)

=== Other artists showcased ===
- Big Mama Thornton
- Buddy Guy
- Buffy Sainte-Marie
- Charlie Musselwhite
- Country Joe and the Fish
- Country Joe McDonald
- David Wilcox
- Eric Andersen
- Ian & Sylvia
- James Cotton
- Jerry Jeff Walker
- Jim Kweskin
- Jimmy Rushing
- Joan Baez
- John Hammond, Jr.
- John McEuen
- Junior Wells
- Larry Coryell
- Mississippi John Hurt
- Oregon
- Perrey and Kingsley
- Peter Case
- Richard Fariña & Mimi Fariña
- Siegel–Schwall Band
- Skip James
- The Clancy Brothers
- The Rooftop Singers
- The Weavers
