= Mary Chess =

American perfumer

Mary Chess (December 27, 1878 – January 12, 1964) was an American perfumer who made fragrances using all natural ingredients. Her company, the eponymous Mary Chess, was owned by Henri Garceau.

== Biography ==
Mary Grace Chess was born in Louisville, Kentucky, the daughter of William E. Chess, who owned a local cordage mill. In 1907 she married Avery Robinson, also from Louisville and son of another Louisville mill owner, who had worked for her father after graduating from MIT. In 1920 Chess and Robinson left for London where Robinson was employed as treasurer to the Royal Philharmonic Society. In London she became famous for her sculpted metal flowers which she sold to the Queen Mother. She founded the Mary Chess Company in 1932.

While in London Chess sent her daughter Carley to study with Nadia Boulanger, despite the composer's pessimistic assessment of the girl's aptitude for music. In the end Carley did not pursue a musical career but instead became a writer of children's books.

Chess died in Pittsfield, Massachusetts on January 12, 1964, at the age of 85.

== Perfumes ==
Mary Chess started making perfumes in New York in 1932 after she was disappointed by the insipid aroma of a bottle of toilet water. "She created all her perfumes herself, using natural ingredients." By 1934 the Mary Chess name was becoming a proxy for fine women's perfume.

Mary created many perfumes, of which arguably the most famous is Tapestry. Probably incomplete perfume list:

- 1932 White Lilac
- 1932 Heliotrope
- 1932 Gardenia
- 1932 Desert Verbena
- 1933 Chessmen
- 1934 Tapestry
- 1934 Yram
- 1935 Floral Odeurs
- 1939 Carnation
- 1941 Elizabethan
- 1942 Strategy
- 1946 Song
- 1956 Souvenir D'un Soir
- 1958 Chivalry
- 1960 Tuileries
- Unknown - Chess D'or

Just after World War II and continuing into the 1960s, a selection of Mary Chess perfumes was sold in glass bottles shaped like chess pieces. Though expensive, these sets proved popular. The Wheaton Glass Company of Millville, New Jersey produced the glass bottles and pressed figural stoppers for Mary Chess from 1946 to 1948.
