= Blues Everywhere I Go =

Studio album by Odetta
- Released: 1999
- Recorded: March 22–June 21, 1999
- Studio: Tiki Recording Studios, Glen Cove, New York
- Genre: Folk, blues
- Length: 63:34
- Label: M.C.
- Producer: Seth Farber, Mark Carpentieri

Odetta chronology
To Ella (1998)	Blues Everywhere I Go (1999)	The Best of the Vanguard Years (1999)

Professional ratings
Review scores
Source	Rating
Allmusic	4.5/5 stars

Blues Everywhere I Go is an album by American folk singer Odetta, released in 1999. It was her first new release in more than a decade.

Allmusic said in their review: "... time doesn't appear to have affected her interpretive skills or the range and quality of her voice, which remains one of the most remarkable instruments in American folk and blues music to date."

Blues Everywhere I Go was nominated for a Grammy Award for Best Traditional Blues Album at the 42nd Grammy Awards. It was her first nomination after over 50 years of recording.

== Track listing ==
1. "Blues Everywhere I Go" (Scott Shirley) – 4:53
2. "Please Send Me Someone to Love" (Percy Mayfield) – 2:33
3. "Dink's Blues" (Dink Johnson) – 4:48
4. "Unemployment Blues" (Big Bill Broonzy) – 4:05
5. "TB Blues" (Victoria Spivey) – 4:06
6. "Trouble Everywhere/I've Been Living With the Blues" (Brownie McGhee/Sippie Wallace) – 4:01
7. "Can't Afford to Lose My Man" (Ernest Lawlars) – 2:56
8. "Homeless Blues" (Porter Grainger) – 5:58
9. "Oh, Papa" (Davide Elman) – 3:01
10. "Look the World Over" (Lawlars) – 3:37
11. "Careless Love/St. Louis Blues" (Lead Belly/W.C. Handy) – 7:50
12. "Hear Me Talking to You" (Louis Armstrong) – 3:15
13. "Rich Man Blues" (Thelma Lowe) – 4:41
14. "W.P.A. Blues" (Broonzy) – 4:12
15. "You Gotta Know How" (Wallace) – 3:38

== Personnel ==
- Odetta – vocals, guitar
- Jimmy Vivino – guitar
- Dr. John – piano, vocals on "Please Send Me Someone to Love" and "Oh Papa"
- Mike Merritt – acoustic bass
- Paul Ossola – acoustic bass
- Shawn Pelton – drums
- Larry Eagle – drums
- Richard Crooks – drums
- Seth Farber – piano
- Tom "Bones" Malone – tenor saxophone, trumpet on "Dink's Blues"

== Production notes ==
- Produced and arranged by Seth Farber
- Engineered by Fred Guarino
- Photography by Robert Corwin
