= Gonna Let It Shine =

Live album by Odetta
- Released: 2005
- Recorded: Fordham University, New York
- Genre: Folk, blues, holiday
- Label: M.C.
- Producer: Mark Carpentieri

Odetta chronology
Women in (E)motion (2002)	Gonna Let It Shine (2005)	Best of the M.C. Records Years 1999-2005 (2006)

Professional ratings
Review scores
Source	Rating
AllMusic	3.5/5 stars

Gonna Let It Shine: A Concert for the Holidays (or simply Gonna Let It Shine), is a live album by American folk singer Odetta, released in 2005. It was recorded at Fordham University in New York City for a public radio broadcast.

Gonna Let It Shine was nominated for a Grammy Award for Best Traditional Blues Album. It was the last album of new material that Odetta would release during her lifetime.

== Track listing ==
All songs Traditional unless otherwise noted.

1. "Intro" – 3:42
2. "This Little Light of Mine" (Harry Loes) – 5:43
3. "Rise Up Shepherd" – 3:22
4. "Mary Had a Baby" – 2:33
5. "What Month Was Jesus Born In?" – 1:46
6. "Shout for Joy" – 2:20
7. "Virgin Mary Had One Son" – 3:17
8. "Down by the Riverside" – 4:06
9. "Poor Little Jesus" – 2:15
10. "Freedom Trilogy: Oh Freedom/Come & Go with Me/I'm on My Way" – 6:32
11. "Somebody Talking 'Bout Jesus" – 1:40
12. "Keep on Movin' It On" (Odetta Gordon) – 2:02
13. "O Jerusalem" (Athena, Faro, Traditional) – 3:33
14. "If Anybody Asks You" (Gordon) – 5:22
15. "Midnight Special" (Huddie Ledbetter) – 4:54
16. "This Little Light of Mine" – 4:41

== Personnel ==
- Odetta – vocals
- Seth Farber – piano
- The Holmes Brothers – background vocals

== Production notes ==
- Engineered by Fred Guarino
- Liner notes by Bernice Johnson Reagon and Odetta
- Executive producers – Catherine and Mark Carpentieri
