= Women in (E)motion (Odetta album) =

Live album by Odetta
- Released: November 19, 2002
- Recorded: September 12, 1990
- Venue: Unser Lieben Frauen Kirche, Bremen, Germany
- Genre: Folk, blues
- Label: Tradition & Moderne

Odetta chronology
The Tradition Masters (2002)	Women in (E)motion (2002)	Gonna Let It Shine (2005)

Professional ratings
Review scores
Source	Rating
Allmusic	3.5/5 stars

Women in (E)motion is a live album by American folk singer Odetta, released in 2002. It was recorded live for the Women In (E)motion Festival in Bremen, Germany in 1990.

== Track listing ==
All songs Traditional unless otherwise noted.

1. "Rambler and Gambler" – 3:12
2. "Before I Can Change My Clothes/Alabama Bound/Bo Weavil" – 8:20
3. "Ninehundred Miles/Going with the Chilly Winds/Don't Blow/Another" – 22:25
4. "Until It's Time for You to Go" (Buffy Sainte-Marie) – 2:50
5. "Carry It Home to Rosie" – 4:16
6. "Many of Miles" – 2:25
7. "Why Don't We Go" – 2:00
8. "Black Woman" – 3:49
9. "God's Gonna Cut You Down" – 2:35

== Personnel ==
- Odetta – vocals, guitar

== Production notes ==
- Engineered by Gerd Anders
- Mastered by Bernd Steinwedel
- Design by Ralf Wittke
- Cover Photo by Franz Pusch
