= Odetta at Carnegie Hall =

Live album by Odetta
- Released: 1960
- Recorded: Carnegie Hall
- Genre: Folk, blues
- Label: Vanguard

Odetta chronology
Ballad for Americans and Other American Ballads (1959)	Odetta at Carnegie Hall (1960)	Christmas Spirituals (1960)

Professional ratings
Review scores
Source	Rating
AllMusic	3/5 stars

Odetta at Carnegie Hall is a live album by American folk singer Odetta, recorded on April 8, 1960 and released later that year. It is now out of print.

At Carnegie Hall is also available along with At Town Hall from 1963, on Vanguard's double-LP The Essential Odetta, but the CD version of that release omits two songs from the At Carnegie Hall LP and eight songs from the At Town Hall LP. It was also re-released on CD along with Ballad for Americans and Other American Ballads on the Italian label Universe. It is difficult to locate as an import.

== Track listing ==
1. "If I Had a Hammer" (Pete Seeger, Lee Hays)
2. "Red Clay Country"
3. "When I Was a Young Girl"
4. "Gallows Pole" (Traditional)
5. "God's A-Gonna Cut You Down" (Traditional)
6. "John Riley" (Traditional)
7. "John Henry" (Traditional)
8. "Joshua Fought the Battle of Jericho" (Traditional)
9. "All The Pretty Little Horses"
10. "Prettiest Train"
11. "Meeting at the Building"
12. "No More Auction Block" (Traditional)
13. "Hold On" (Traditional)
14. "Sometimes I Feel Like a Motherless Child" (Traditional)
15. "Ain't No Grave Can Hold My Body Down" (Traditional)

== Personnel ==
- Odetta – vocals, guitar
- Bill Lee – bass
- Tracks 12–15: assisted by the Choir of the Master & their choir director Dr. Theodore Stent
