= Odetta and the Blues =

Studio album by Odetta
- Released: July 1962
- Recorded: Plaza Sound Studios, New York City; April 11–12, 1962
- Genres: Country blues; folk; jazz; vaudeville
- Length: 35:30
- Label: Riverside OBC-509
- Producers: Orrin Keepnews; Phil de Lancie (1991, Fantasy Studios, Berkeley

Odetta chronology
| Christmas Spirituals (1960) | Odetta and the Blues (1962) | Sometimes I Feel Like Cryin' (1962) |

Odetta and the Blues is an album by folk singer Odetta, released in 1962.

Odetta had broken ties with her first manager (and close friend) Dean Gitter, which led to Gitter suing her for unpaid revenues during her 1957 concert tour. During this period, Gitter had committed her to recording for the Riverside label. This one recording for Riverside was part of her settlement with Gitter. By this time, she had made the decision to leave Vanguard Records and move away from folk music for a period of time and start recording blues for RCA Records. Odetta had been coveting a movie role based on Bessie Smith's life and felt that releasing a blues album would be a good way to transition her public in accepting her as a blues singer. She recorded her Riverside album and her first album for RCA within 2 weeks of each other in April 1962.

Recorded as the 1950s/1960s American folk music revival was getting underway, the album is notable for Odetta's use of a jazz band on the record.

It has subsequently been re-released on CD in 1984 on Riverside/Original Blues Classics (OBCCD-509-2), Ace (509) (1993) and Legacy (354).

Professional ratings
Review scores
| Source | Rating |
|---|---|
| AllMusic | 4.5/5 stars |

== Track listing ==
All songs are traditional unless otherwise noted.

1. "Hard, Oh Lord" - 4:09
2. "Believe I'll Go" - 3:05
3. "Oh, Papa" - 3:18
4. "How Long Blues" (Leroy Carr) - 2:10
5. "Hogan's Alley" - 2:12
6. "Leavin' This Morning" - 2:50
7. "Oh, My Babe" - 4:23
8. "Yonder Comes the Blues" - 2:51
9. "Make Me a Pallet on the Floor" - 3:49
10. "Weeping Willow Blues" (Paul Carter) - 2:36
11. "Go Down, Sunshine" - 2:21
12. "Nobody Knows You When You're Down and Out" (Jimmy Cox) - 2:20

== Personnel ==
- Odetta – vocals
- Buck Clayton – trumpet
- Vic Dickenson – trombone
- Herb Hall – clarinet
- Dick Wellstood – piano
- Ahmed Abdul-Malik – bass
- Berisford "Shep" Shepherd – drums

== Production notes ==
- Arrangements – Dick Wellstood
- Recording engineer – Ray Fowler
