= Sometimes I Feel Like Cryin' =

Studio album by Odetta
- Released: September 1962
- Genre: Folk, blues
- Label: RCA Victor
- Producer: George Avakian, Neely Plumb

Odetta chronology
Odetta and the Blues (1962)	Sometimes I Feel Like Cryin' (1962)	Odetta at Town Hall (1962)

Sometimes I Feel Like Cryin' is an album by American folk singer Odetta, released in 1962. It was her first release for RCA Victor.

Professional ratings
Review scores
Source	Rating
Allmusic	4.5/5 stars
New Record Mirror	4/5 stars

== Track listing ==
All tracks composed by Odetta; except where noted.

1. "Gonna Take My Time"
2. "Stranger Here"
3. "I've Been Living with the Blues" (Brownie McGhee)
4. "Be My Woman"
5. "Poor Man"
6. "Empty Pocket Blues" (Lee Hays, Pete Seeger)
7. "I Just Can't Keep from Cryin'"
8. "Special Delivery"
9. "If I Had Wings" (Traditional)
10. "Darlin' Baby"
11. "Misery Blues"
12. "House of the Rising Sun" (Traditional)

== Personnel ==
- Odetta – vocals, guitar
- Dick Wellstood – piano
- Ahmed Abdul-Malik, Leonard Gaskin – bass guitar
- Panama Francis – drums
- Buck Clayton – trumpet
- Vic Dickenson – trombone
- Buster Bailey – clarinet
