= Ruth McEnery Stuart =

American novelist

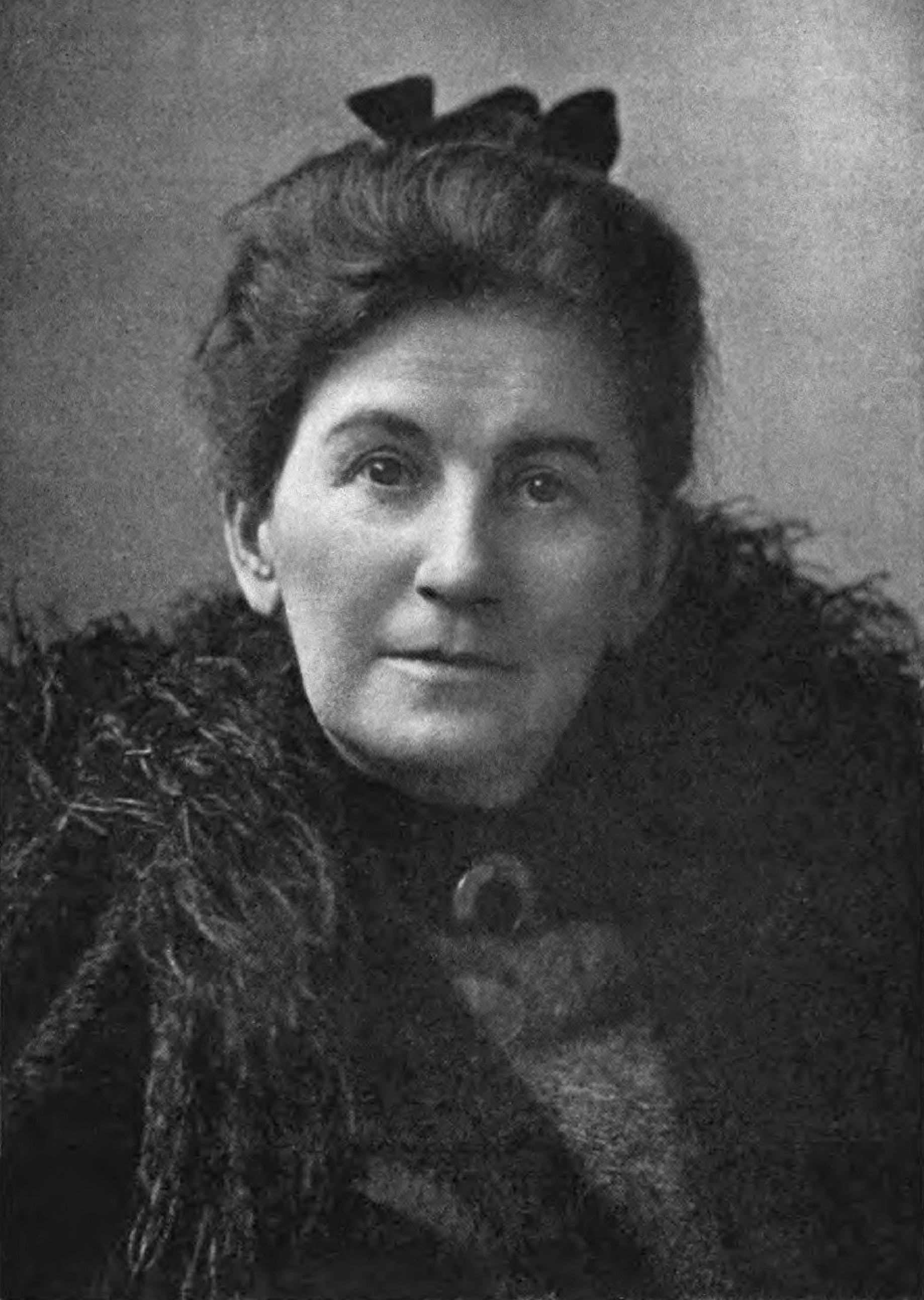
- Born: May 21, 1849; Marksville, Avoyelles Parish, Louisiana
- Died: May 6, 1917 (aged 67); New York City
- Resting place: New Orleans, Louisiana
- Other name: Mary Routh McEnery Stuart
- Occupation: Writer
- Known for: Sonny (1896)
- Spouse: Alfred Oden Stuart

Ruth McEnery Stuart (1849–1917) was an American author.

== Early life and marriage ==
She was born Mary Routh McEnery Stuart, child of James and Mary Routh (Stirling) McEnery in Marksville, Louisiana. (She changed the spelling of her name to "Ruth" after she began her career in literature.) Stuart's true date of birth is not known with certainty. In addition to the date shown here in 1849, Stuart's date of birth is also shown as 19 February 1852 on her marriage certificate. When she was three, Stuart moved to New Orleans, Louisiana. Stuart taught school there until she married Arkansas farmer Alfred Oden Stuart on 6 August 1879. Alfred Oden Stuart was a widower with eleven children; he died in 1883 and she returned to New Orleans. Ruth and Alfred Oden Stuart had one son, but he died in 1904 or 1905.

Stuart was born to a wealthy and politically powerful family; one biographer writes that "it has been said that the Rouths and the McEnerys owned more slaves than any other two families in the United States."

She was the first cousin of John McEnery, who claimed to have been elected governor of Louisiana in 1872 — massive voter fraud on his behalf led to his "win" being thrown out — and Samuel D. McEnery, who served as Louisiana governor from 1881 to 1888 and as a U.S. senator from 1897 to 1910. She was also related to Louisiana governors Isaac Johnson and Robert Wickliffe; another cousin was the state's first lady as the wife of Murphy J. Foster.

== Writing career ==
Stuart first published in February 1888 in the New Princeton Review. She sold a second story to Harpers New Monthly Magazine shortly thereafter; in the early 1890s she moved to New York City. Stuart was active in her literary career from 1888 until 1917, producing some 75 works. Between 1891 and 1897 she produced "20 books, short stories, sketches, and reprinted verses she had originally published in magazines". She was known not just for her writing, but also for oral performances of her work. Her most famous work is said to be Sonny (1896). She was also occasionally a sub-editor at Harpers.

Stuart has been characterized as belonging to the school of "American local color writing that emphasizes regional characteristics in landscape, way of life, and language." Stuart's treatment of blacks forms a significant portion of her corpus and, if potentially troublesome today, "contemporary critics acclaimed her as providing an authentic representation of African Americans." For example, she is believed to have transcribed a black spiritual song now known as "Rise Up, Shepherd, and Follow." Her work is said to be of the same school as Kate Chopin.

Stuart's work was appreciated in England. She became a member of the Lyceum Club there in 1904. In 1915 she was granted an honorary Litt.D. by Tulane University. Also in 1915 a literary club, Ruth McEnery Stuart Clan, was founded and named in her honor.

Stuart died in New York City in 1917 and was buried in New Orleans.

== Works ==
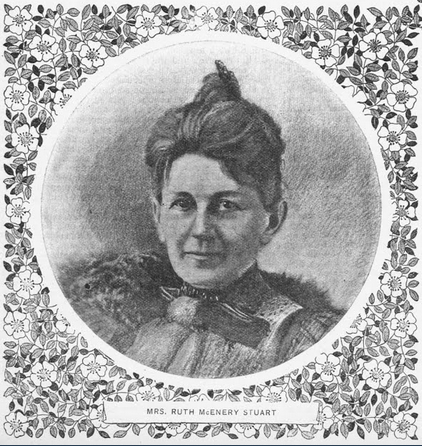
Ruth McEnery Stuart

- Jessekiah Brown's Courtship (1892) (Short Story in Harper's Monthly)
- A Golden Wedding and Other Tales (1893) (Her first collection)
- The Story of Babette (1894)
- Carlotta's Intended and Other Tales (1894)
- Sonny: A Christmas Guest (1896) (Her most popular work)
- Solomon Crowe's Christmas Pockets and Other Tales (1896)
- Gobolinks; or Shadow Pictures for Young and Old Collaborated with Albert Bigelow Paine) (1896) From the Collections at the Library of Congress
- The Snow-Cap Sisters; a Farce (1897)
- In Simpkinsville; Character Tales (1897)
- Moriah's Mourning and other half-hour sketches (1898)
- The Second Wooing of Salina Sue and Other Stories (1898)
- Holly and Pizen, and other stories (1899)
- Napoleon Jackson, the Gentleman of the Plush Rocker (1902)
- George Washington Jones, a Christmas gift that went a-begging (1903)
- The River's Children: an Idyll of the Mississippi (1904)
- Aunt Amity's Silver Wedding, and Other Stories (1909)
- Sonny's Father (1910) (Sequel)
- The Unlived Life of Little Mary Ellen (1910)
- The haunted photograph, whence and whither, a case in diplomacy, the afterglow (1911)
- Daddy Do-Funny's Wisdom Jingles (1913)
- The Cocoon; a Rest-Cure Comedy (1915) (Last novel)
- Plantation Songs and Other Verse (1916) (Last work)
