= Waterboy (song) =

"Waterboy" / "Water Boy"
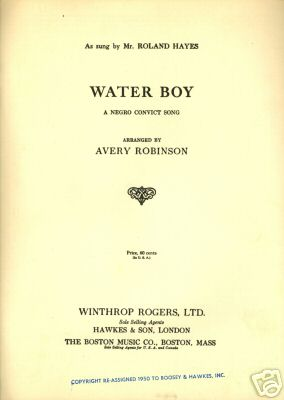
- Cover of sheet music to a piano version of the "negro convict song" arranged by Avery Robinson for singer Roland Hayes, 1950

Song
- Published: 1922
- Genre: Jazz, Folk, Blues
- Length: Typically 3-4 mins
- Composer(s): Avery Robinson (arr.)
- Lyricist(s): Traditional

"Waterboy" (a.k.a. "The Water Boy") is an American traditional folk song. It is built on the call "Water boy, where are you hidin'?" The call is one of several water boy calls in cotton plantation folk tradition.

Numerous artists have written and/or recorded their own versions of this African-American traditional song, including Jacques Wolfe, a Romanian immigrant, and Avery Robinson who popularized "Water Boy" as a jazz song in the 1920s. From 1949 onwards, many blues and folk artists have performed their own arrangements of it.

The opening call to the "water boy" has been said to bear a resemblance to melodies found in classical works by Cui, Tchaikovsky, and Liszt, as well as a Jewish marriage song and a Native American tune. The first melody of the subsequent refrain is similar to the old German tune "Mendebras," used for the hymn "Oh Day of Rest and Gladness."

== Versions ==
- Roland Hayes (1922): Arranged by Avery Robinson; see sheet music for the song.
- Fats Waller - Fats Waller in London (1922), 1938 (1938). "Waterboy" was recorded by several other jazz singers around this time, including Earl Hines and John Payne.
- Paul Robeson recorded the song several times.
- Edric Connor in a British Pathé short film (1947); this is also the version arranged by Avery Robinson.
- John Lee Hooker (1949): This version appears on The Country Blues of John Lee Hooker, The Unknown John Lee Hooker: 1949 Recordings, and Jack O' Diamonds: 1949 Recordings.
- Odetta & Larry - The Tin Angel (1954)
- Odetta - My Eyes Have Seen (1959): Song: "I've Been Driving on Bald Mountain/Water Boy". Odetta performed "Waterboy" regularly, and it appears on several of her albums. It is also the song she plays in the film No Direction Home, in a TV performance from the 1960s (which highlighted her influence on Bob Dylan).
- Harry Belafonte and Odetta - Belafonte Returns to Carnegie Hall (1960)
- Jimmie Rodgers (1960)
- Don Shirley Trio (1961)
- Allan Sherman did a parody of the song as "Seltzer Boy" on the album My Son, the Folk Singer (1962). He was sued by the songwriter's estate for copyright infringement and paid damages.
- Roger Whittaker - The Last Farewell (1975)
- The Kingston Trio - Stewart Years
- Rhiannon Giddens - Tomorrow Is My Turn (2015)
