= Rise Up, Shepherd, and Follow =

19th-century American spiritual

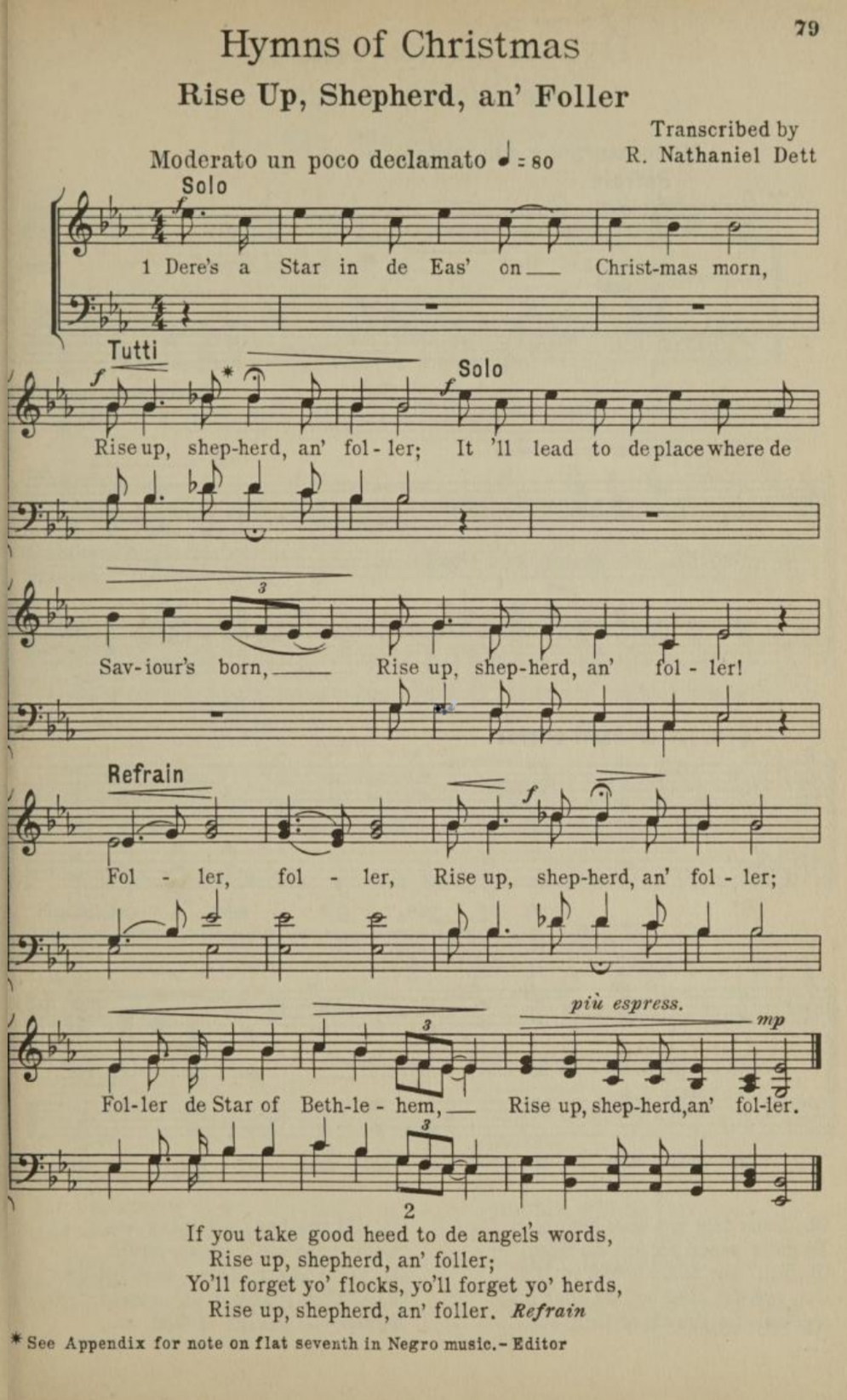
- Sheet music as published by R. Nathaniel Dett in 1927

Song
- Released: Unknown; documented to 1891
- Genre: Spiritual, hymn
- Songwriter: Unknown

"Rise Up, Shepherd, and Follow" is a song telling the story of Christmas morning, describing a "star in the East" that will lead to the birthplace of Jesus Christ. The title derives from a lyric repeated throughout the song. The song is best known as a black spiritual and, depending on how it is arranged and performed, has also been called a hymn, carol, gospel song, and folk song.

"Rise Up, Shepherd" was first documented in a short story by Ruth McEnery Stuart in 1891, in which she likely transcribed a song overheard from plantation laborers. The song has since become a popular standard for spiritual and Christmas music, performed by numerous choirs and artists as wide-ranging as Odetta, Pete Seeger, Mary J. Blige, and the Muppets.

== History ==
The exact origin of "Rise Up, Shepherd" is unknown and sources differ in their estimates. Although likely a folk song created and passed down by black laborers in the American South, the song cannot be definitively dated to before Reconstruction. The Christmas Carol Reader states it was included in an unnamed 1867 publication and "probably dates from the vague chronological expanse of the eighteenth and nineteenth centuries."

The song first definitively appears in print in 1891. The January–June volume of Lippincott's Monthly Magazine contains a short story titled "Christmas-Gifts" by Ruth McEnery Stuart that depicts a scene where black slaves sing for their owner. The song is part of a Christmas celebration on a Louisiana plantation and includes two verses.

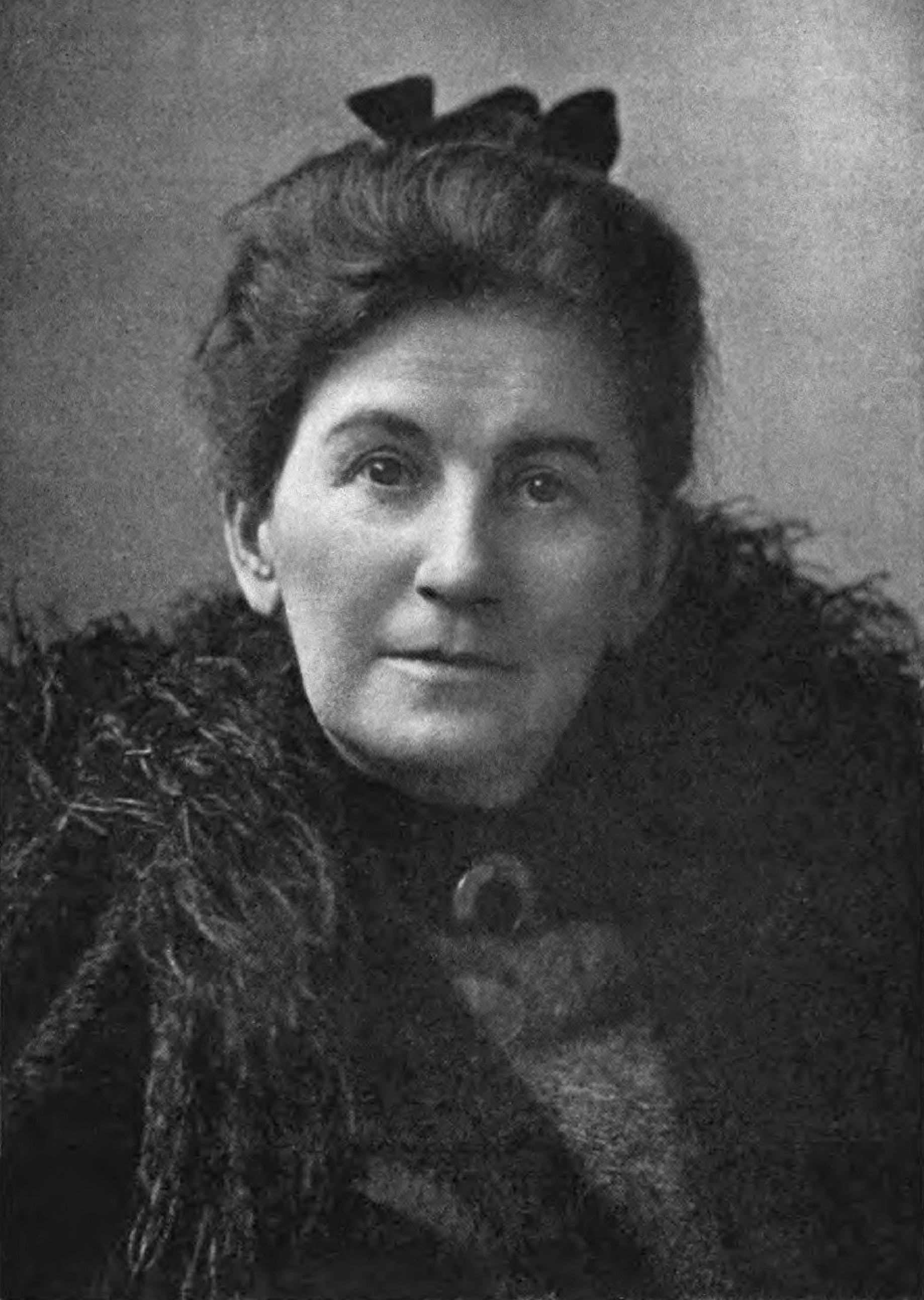
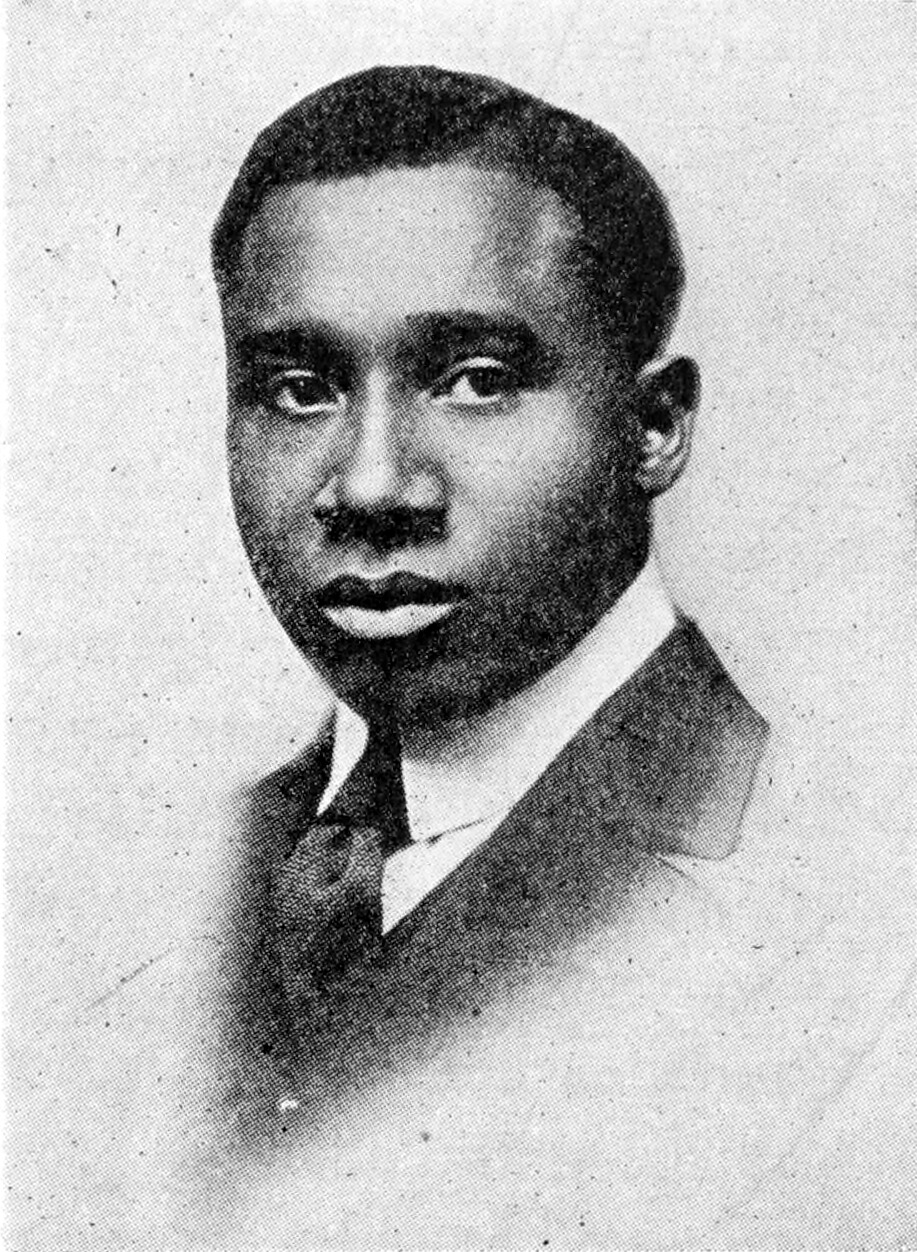
Stuart (left) published the first known lyrics in 1891. Dett (right) published an influential version of the song in 1927.

Stuart's lyrics employ heavy dialect in imitation of the slaves' speech (such as "foller" for "follow"). The song is untitled in her story, and other publications offered various titles such as "Plantation Christmas Carol." Subsequent publications continued this use of dialect, but over time song books adopted standard English spelling and the song is now most commonly titled "Rise Up, Shepherd, and Follow."

Kate Douglas Wiggin is the first known source of written music for "Rise Up, Shepherd." The song appeared in 1896's Nine Love Songs and a Carol as the aforementioned "Plantation Christmas Carol." Wiggin credits Stuart for the lyrics and notes that the song should be performed in the "fashion of a plantation melody," but it is unknown how much she drew from actual plantation laborers versus her own composition.

The song disseminated widely in the early twentieth century. It appeared in a 1900 issue of The Young Woman's Journal, a 1902 issue of Southern Workman, and the 1909 songbook Religious Folksongs of the Negro as Sung on the Plantations. Scholar and civil rights activist James Weldon Johnson included "Rise Up, Shepherd" in his 1926 collection The Second Book of Negro Spirituals. Johnson theorized that the song was "of recent date" and was probably created after emancipation.

Canadian-American composer and professor R. Nathaniel Dett published a collection of spirituals in 1927 titled Religious Folksongs of the Negro that included "Rise Up, Shepherd." His version of the song would become the basis for most modern renditions.

== Biblical analysis ==
"The Singing Window" at Tuskegee University, reconstructed after the original was destroyed in a 1957 fire. Lyrics from "Rise Up, Shepherd" are seen in the center.

Though biblically inspired, "Rise Up, Shepherd" is not a direct retelling of any specific story in the Bible. The song seems to conflate two separate moments from different books. Luke 2:8–20 tells the story of shepherds who are visited by an angel announcing the birth of Christ, but no star is mentioned. Matthew 2:1–12 depicts the magi, not shepherds, following the Star of Bethlehem to the birthplace of Christ.

== Legacy ==
"Rise Up, Shepherd" has become a popular song in a variety of traditions, appearing in collections of black spirituals, hymns, and Christmas carols. One source states its popularity grew in the 1980s during a revived interest in black spiritual music.

In particular, the song's relationship and probable origin with Civil War–era black Americans has given the song special meaning within black history. In 1932, the historically black school Tuskegee Institute (now Tuskegee University) commissioned Katharine Lamb Tait to design stained glass windows depicting famous spirituals for its chapel, including "Rise Up, Shepherd." The song also appears in the poet and playwright Langston Hughes' Black Nativity, an adaptation of the Nativity story staged with an all-black cast.
