= Odetta Sings =

Studio album by Odetta
- Released: December 1970
- Studio: Muscle Shoals Sound Studios, Muscle Shoals; Larabee Sound Studios, Los Angeles, California
- Genre: Soul, rock, folk, pop
- Label: Polydor
- Producer: John Boylan

Odetta chronology
Odetta Sings the Blues (1968)	Odetta Sings (1970)	The Essential Odetta (1973)

Odetta Sings is a 1970 album by Odetta. It is her only album for the Polydor label.

The album was recorded with many well-known session musicians and special guests, and contained a significant amount of contemporary material. This includes work by Randy Newman, Paul McCartney, James Taylor, Elton John and the Rolling Stones.

== Reception ==
Professional ratings
Review scores
Source	Rating
Allmusic	2/5 stars

Allmusic stated in their review "Only two songs are written by Odetta herself, "Hit or Miss" and "Movin' It On," which is a shame since they are by far the best tracks of the album. Odetta's deep, dark, warm voice distinguishes her from most soul singers, and these two songs give an idea of what it could have sounded like had she decided to release a real soul album..."

In 2012, Welsh singer Tom Jones included a cover of "Hit or Miss" on his album Spirit in the Room.

== Track listing ==
1. "Take Me to the Pilot" (Elton John, Bernie Taupin) – 2:53
2. "Mama Told Me (Not to Come)" (Randy Newman) – 2:53
3. "Every Night" (Paul McCartney) – 3:02
4. "Hit or Miss" (Odetta Gordon) – 2:52
5. "Give a Damn" (Bob Dorough, Stuart Scharf) – 3:08
6. "My God and I" (John Buck Wilkin) – 4:28
7. "Lo and Behold" (James Taylor) – 2:58
8. "Bless the Children" (Don Cooper) – 2:24
9. "No Expectations" (Mick Jagger, Keith Richards) – 3:25
10. "Movin' It On" (Odetta Gordon) – 2:32

== Personnel ==
- Odetta – vocals, guitar
- Carole King – piano
- Barry Beckett – keyboards
- Roger Hawkins – drums
- John Boylan – rhythm guitar
- Jimmy Johnson – rhythm guitar
- Russ Kunkel – drums
- Bernie Leadon – guitar
- Eddie Hinton – lead guitar
- David Hood – bass guitar
- Merry Clayton – background vocals
- Venetta Fields – background vocals
- Clydie King – background vocals
- Sherlie Matthews – background vocals
- Bob West – bass guitar
- Jimmie Haskell – strings arrangements

Technical

- Herb Cohen – executive producer
- Terence Boylan – coordinator
- Henry Diltz – photography
