= John Riley (song) =

English folk song

"John Riley" is a traditional English folk song (Roud #264, Laws N42). It is also known as "Johnny Riley", "The Broken Token" and "A Fair Young Maid All in Her Garden", among other titles.

== Background ==
The song is derived from Homer's Odyssey, interpreted through the 17th century English folk ballad tradition, and tells the story of a prospective suitor who asks a woman if she will marry him. She replies that she cannot because she is betrothed to John Riley, who has gone away over the seas.

The man persists, asking her whether Riley is worth waiting for and suggesting that he may have drowned, been killed in war, or married another woman. She steadfastly maintains that she will continue to wait for Riley, regardless of his possible fate. In the last stanza, the suitor reveals that he is in fact John Riley, returned from the seas, and has been testing his beloved.

The song's theme, that of the "disguised true lover", has long been a theme in traditional folk ballads and several variations of this song exist.

== Versions in popular culture ==
- Pete Seeger released a version of the song on his album Darling Corey (1950).
- Bob Gibson wrote and recorded a version of the song for his album Live at Cornell (1957) and The Riverside Folklore Series, Vol. 1: Joy Joy! The Young And Wonderful Bob Gibson (1996).
- Odetta released a live version of the song on her live album Odetta at Carnegie Hall which was recorded on April 8, 1960.
- Joan Baez recorded the song for her debut album, Joan Baez (1960); her version is often credited with helping to popularise the song during the 1960s folk revival.
- Art Podell and Paul Potash, known as the folk duo Art & Paul, also recorded the song for their album Songs of Earth and Sky (1960).
- Judy Collins included it on her 1961 album A Maid of Constant Sorrow.
- Australian folk singer Lionel Long recorded a version he "learned from a seaman" on his album Troubadour in 1965.
- The American folk rock band The Byrds recorded a version of the song that was influenced by Baez's rendition on their album, Fifth Dimension (1966). The Byrds also released an instrumental version on the bonus tracks of their Fifth Dimension album.
- The Walkabouts recorded a version on their debut album See Beautiful Rattlesnake Gardens (1988).
- William Pint recorded a version of the song for his album Round the Corner in 1997.
- The English folk duo Show of Hands recorded the song for their self-released album Folk Music (1998).
- Carol Noonan recorded the song for her release Carol Noonan - Self Titled (1999).
- John Langstaff recorded a version of the song for his multi-disc folk music collection John Langstaff Sings - Archival Folk Collection (2004).
- On the series finale of Andromeda, Doyle paraphrases this song when describing a dream she had.
- Niteworks released a version of this song, with vocals by Beth Malcolm, on their album A' Ghrian (2022).

== Lyrics ==
A fair young maid all in her garden,
A strange young man comes passing by
Saying fair maid, will you marry me
And this answer was her reply

No kind sir, I cannot marry thee
For I've a love who sails all on the sea
He's been gone for seven years
But still no man shall marry me

Well what if he's in some battle slain
Or drowned in the deep salt sea
Or what if he's found another love
And he and his love both married be?

If he's in some battle slain
I will die, when the moon doth wane
And if he's drowned in the deep salt sea
I'll be true to his memory

And if he's found another love
And he and his love both married be
Then I wish them health and happiness
Where they now dwell across the sea

He picked her up all in his arms
And kisses gave her one two and three
Saying weep no more my own true love
I am your long lost John Riley.
