= Ballad for Americans and Other American Ballads =

Studio album by Odetta
- Released: 1960
- Genre: Folk, blues
- Label: Vanguard

Odetta chronology
My Eyes Have Seen (1959)	Ballad for Americans and Other American Ballads (1960)	Odetta at Carnegie Hall (1960)

Ballad for Americans and Other American Ballads is an album by American folk singer Odetta. It was released in 1960.

== Background ==
The title song was written by Earl Robinson who had been blacklisted during the Red Scare in the US. Allmusic states: "Odetta's rendition has a vitality and immediacy that puts it squarely in the thick of 1960, in the middle of the civil rights movement's heyday, at a time when Paul Robeson, because of age and infirmity, and years of fighting the government's efforts to silence him, was in eclipse as an artist."

Ballad For Americans and Other American Ballads was re-released on CD along with Odetta at Carnegie Hall on the Italian label Universe. It was also included in a 2012 7-album Odetta collection from UK budget label Real Gone.

== Reception ==
Professional ratings
Review scores
Source	Rating
Allmusic	4/5 stars

In his review for Allmusic, critic Bruce Eder wrote the album was Odetta's "most ambitious album up to this point in time—and for some years to come." He singled out "Pastures of Plenty," as one of the best tracks, calling it "a rendition so ominous and provocative that it rates with the best this reviewer has ever heard (which are Guthrie's own and Dylan's early-'60s officially unreleased version)."

== Track listing ==
1. "Ballad for Americans" (Earl Robinson) – 11:44
2. "This Land" (Woody Guthrie) – 2:20
3. "On Top of Old Smokey" (Traditional) – 3:02
4. "Hush Little Baby" (Traditional) – 1:32
5. "Dark as a Dungeon" (Merle Travis) – 4:21
6. "Great Historical Bum" (Guthrie) – 1:58
7. "Payday at Coal Creek" (Traditional) – 3:30
8. "Going Home" (Traditional) – 2:42
9. "Pastures of Plenty" (Woody Guthrie) 4:02

== Personnel ==
- Odetta – vocals, guitar
- Bill Lee – bass
- Fred Hellerman – guitar
- Robert De Cormier – choral arranger, conductor
