= Dick Wellstood =

American jazz pianist (1927–1987)

- Born: Richard MacQueen Wellstood; November 25, 1927; Greenwich, Connecticut, U.S.
- Died: July 24, 1987 (aged 59) Palo Alto, California, U.S.
- Genres: Jazz
- Occupation: Musician
- Instrument: Piano
- Years active: 1940s–1980s

Richard MacQueen Wellstood (November 25, 1927 – July 24, 1987) was an American jazz pianist.

== Career ==
He was born in Greenwich, Connecticut, United States. Wellstood's mother was a graduate of the Juilliard School who played church organ. Wellstood took piano lessons as a boy, though he was self-taught as a performer of stride and boogie-woogie. Beginning in 1946, he played boogie-woogie, swing, stride piano, and dixieland with bands led by Bob Wilber. A year later he began two years of accompanying Sidney Bechet. In 1952, he toured Europe with Jimmy Archey, then worked with Roy Eldridge. Through the 1950s, he worked with a band led by Conrad Janis. He also worked with Red Allen, Buster Bailey, Wild Bill Davison, Vic Dickenson, Coleman Hawkins, and Ben Webster. He went to school and received a law degree, though thirty years would pass before he spent a brief time practicing law.

In the 1960s, he worked with Bob Dylan and Odetta. With Carl Warwick, he performed on military bases in Greenland. He toured South America with Gene Krupa, then spent two years with Kenny Davern. During the 1970s, he played with Captain John Handy and Punch Miller, then with Yank Lawson and Bob Haggart. For the rest of his career, he turned his attention from big bands to small groups and solo piano, performing often at the Newport Jazz Festival and touring with Davern and Bob Rosengarden. In the 1980s, he joined the Classic Jazz Quartet with Marty Grosz, Joe Muranyi, and Dick Sudhalter, worked again in a duo with Davern and in a piano duo with Dick Hyman.

In 1987, he died of a heart attack in Palo Alto, California, at the age of 59.

== Discography ==
=== As leader ===
- Uptown and Lowdown (Prestige Swingville, 1961)
- From Dixie to Swing (Music Minus One, 1971)
- From Ragtime On (Chiaroscuro, 1971)
- Jazz at the New School (Chiaroscuro, 1972)
- Plays Ragtime Music of The Sting (Pickwick, 1974)
- Rapport with Billy Butterfield (77 Records, 1975)
- Live at the Cookery (Chiaroscuro, 1975)
- This Is the One (Audiophile, 1977)
- The Music of Scott Joplin (Pickwick, 1977)
- Some Hefty Cats! (Hefty Jazz 1977)
- Live at Hanratty's (Chaz Jazz, 1981; reissued by Chiaroscuro, 2000)
- I Wish I Were Twins with Dick Hyman (Swingtime, 1983)
- The Bob Wilber Dick Wellstood Duet (Parkwood, 1984)
- Live at Cafe des Copains (Unisson, 1986)
- Live Hot Jazz with Kenny Davern (Statiras, 1986)
- Ragtime Piano Favorites (1988)
- This Is the One...Dig! (Solo Art, 1977)
- Take Me to the Land of Jazz with Marty Grosz (Aviva, 1978)
- In the Jazz Tradition (Fat Cat's Jazz, 1980)
- The Classic Jazz Quartet (Jazzology, 1985)
- Never in a Million Years with Kenny Davern (Challenge, 1995)
- Alone (Solo Art, 1997)
- Live at the Sticky Wicket (Arbors, 1997)
- A Night in Dublin (Arbors, 2000)
- Stridemonster! The Duo Pianos of Dick Hyman and Dick Wellstood (Sackville, 2005)

=== As sideman ===
With Sidney Bechet

- Creole Reeds (Riverside, 1956)
- The Grand Master of the Soprano Saxophone and Clarinet (Columbia, 1956)

With Marty Grosz

- I Hope Gabriel Likes My Music (Aviva, 1982)
- Marty Grosz and The Keepers of the Flame (Stomp Off, 1987)

With Odetta

- Odetta and the Blues (Riverside, 1962)
- Sometimes I Feel Like Cryin' (RCA Victor, 1962)

With Bob Wilber

- Bob Wilber and His Jazz Band Volume 1 (Circle, 1949)
- Spreadin' Joy (Classic Jazz, 1976)
- Evolution of the Blues (Music Minus One, 1976)

With others

- Louis Armstrong, Sidney Bechet, Kid Ory, Voyage a La Nouvelle Orleans (CBS, 1972)
- Bob Barnard, Class! (Calligraph, 1988)
- Dan Barrett, Strictly Instrumental (Concord Jazz, 1987)
- Dick Cary, Dick Cary and the Dixieland Doodlers (Columbia, 1959)
- Kenny Davern, ''Stretchin' Out'' (Jazzology, 1983)
- Doc Cheatham, The Fabulous Doc Cheatham (Parkwood 1984)
- Wild Bill Davison, Swingin' Dixie (Bear, 1962)
- Bob Dylan, The Freewheelin' Bob Dylan (Columbia, 1963)
- Harry Edison, Roy Eldridge, Red Allen, Buck Clayton, Swing Trumpet Kings (Verve, 1996)
- Roy Eldridge, Swing Goes Dixie (Verve, 1956)
- Jim Galloway, Walking On Air (Bitter Sweet Jazz 1979)
- Leonard Gaskin, At the Jazz Band Ball (Prestige Swingville, 1962)
- Nancy Harrow, Wild Women Don't Have the Blues (Candid, 1961)
- Conrad Janis, Conrad Janis and His Tailgate Five (Jubilee, 1954)
- Henry Jerome, Strings in Dixieland (Decca, 1962)
- John Letman, The Many Angles of John Letman (Bethlehem, 1960)
- Marian McPartland, Piano Jazz with Dick Wellstood (Jazz Alliance, 1993)
- Tony Parenti, Tony Parenti and His Downtown Boys (Jazzology, 1965)
- Cynthia Sayer, The Jazz Banjo of Cynthia Sayer Volume One (New York Jazz, 1987)
- Janis Siegel, At Home (Atlantic, 1987)
- Jack Six, Bacharach Revisited: Bacharach for Instrumentalists (Music Minus One, 1969)
- Andy Stein, Goin' Places (Stomp Off, 1987)
- Joe Venuti and Zoot Sims, Joe & Zoot (Chiaroscuro, 1974)

== Bibliography ==
- Scivales, Riccardo, ed. Dick Wellstood Jazz Piano Solos: Seven Historic Solos. San Diego, California: Neil A. Kjos Music, 1994
- Scivales, Riccardo, ed. Dick Wellstood: The Art of Jazz and Blues Piano. Vol. 1. London: Soliloquy Music, 2001
