= Vanguard Visionaries (Odetta album) =

Compilation album by Odetta
- Released: June 12, 2007
- Genre: Folk, blues
- Length: 30:38
- Label: Vanguard
- Producer: Vince Hans

Odetta chronology
Best of the M.C. Records Years 1999-2005 (2006)	Vanguard Visionaries (2007)

Vanguard Visionaries is a compilation album by American folk singer Odetta, released in 2007.

It is a short compilation (10 songs) and contains recordings from the Vanguard Records years. To celebrate their 60th anniversary, Vanguard had released a series of artist samplers called Vanguard Visionaries from the 1960s and early-'70s era. All the songs are available on other compilations.

== Reception ==
Professional ratings
Review scores
Source	Rating
Allmusic	3/5 stars

In his Allmusic review, music critic Mark Deming wrote the album "makes clear the legendary folk-blues singer has an amazing voice, nearly flawless instincts about what to do with it, fine taste in songs, and a sure hand with her guitar. However, it's far too scattershot in its assembly and execution to do much else... Each of the ten songs on Odetta's edition of Vanguard Visionaries are a joy to listen to, but beyond that this disc doesn't do much to educate the unenlightened about who Odetta is and why she's important, and that's one lesson more folks need to learn."

== Track listing ==
All songs Traditional unless otherwise noted.

1. "Midnight Special" – 3:25
2. "He's Got the Whole World in His Hands" – 2:07
3. "Cotton Fields" (Lead Belly) – 3:24
4. "House of the Rising Sun" – 3:18
5. "Another Man Done Gone" – 2:34
6. "Livin' with the Blues" – 3:41
7. "Special Delivery Blues" – 2:40
8. "Down on Me" – 2:56
9. "Cool Water" (Bob Nolan) – 3:06
10. "Jumpin' Judy" – 2:27

== Personnel ==
- Odetta – vocals

== Production notes ==
- Georgette Cartwright – creative services coordinator
- Vince Hans – compilation producer
- Amy L. VonHolzhausen – package design
