= Fred Gerlach =

- Born: Fred Gerlach; August 26, 1925; Detroit, Michigan, U.S.
- Died: December 31, 2009 (aged 84); San Diego, California, U.S.
- Occupations: Singer, 12 string guitarist, luthier
- Children: David Gerlach
- Relatives: Jesse Lee Kincaid (nephew)
- Musical career
- Genres: folk music
- Instruments: Vocals, guitar
- Years active: 1962–2006
- Labels: Folkways Records, Eyrie Records, Takoma Records

Fred Gerlach (August 26, 1925 – December 31, 2009) was an American folk musician and luthier. Led Zeppelin guitarist Jimmy Page credited his recording of Lead Belly's version of the song "Gallows Pole" with inspiring his own band's version.

== Background ==
In the early 1950s, he sang in the Jewish Young Folksingers chorus conducted by Robert De Cormier. Gerlach was among the first folk artists to adopt the 12 string guitar as his medium. A friend of fellow folk musicians Ramblin' Jack Elliott, Woody Guthrie and Pete Seeger, his first album was even called Twelve-String Guitar. Led Zeppelin covered its flagship song, "Gallows Pole". Guitarist Jimmy Page said:

"I first heard it ('Gallows Pole') on an old Folkways LP by Fred Gerlach, a 12-string player who was, I believe, the first white to play the instrument. I used his version as a basis and completely changed the arrangement

Gerlach was inspired to adopt the 12 string by his mentor and one-time roommate Lead Belly, a blues guitarist famous for using the instrument. At the time, Gerlach became interested in the instrument, it was rarely used. He later related:

"I went into one of the largest musical instrument stores in the country, and the manager assured me that no such instrument existed. On another occasion, a maker of fine 12-string lutes (nylon strings) pictured for me a nightmare of explosive force required to hold twelve steel strings in proper tension. He envisioned bits of guitar and guitarist flying asunder. I have combed New York City pawnshops and music stores and have received a variety of comments ranging' from 'Sorry, we're out of them now. Won't a six-string guitar do? to 'Have you got rocks in your head, buddy?' In fact, it took me about a year after I had first decided to play a twelve-string before I found one. It wasn't a concentrated search, but it nevertheless indicates the general unavailability of the instrument."

Because of the difficulty in finding 12 string guitars, Gerlach began to make his own, for himself and his peers. Pete Seeger, Leo Kottke, Dick Rosmini, who along with other well known folk musicians came to use his instruments.

Gerlach is the uncle of Jesse Lee Kincaid who was a member of the Rising Sons, a 1960s blues band.

== Career ==
Gerlach recorded his Twelve-String Guitar album which was released on Folkways FG 3525 in 1962. It was given a three-star rating by Billboard in the magazine's 17 March 1962 issue.

It was mentioned in the 25 May 1963 issue of Billboard that Gerlach, the Sherwood Singers, and the Mad Mountain Ramblers. etc. were set to appear on shows by talent coordinator Russell Giguerre.

On 18 August 1963, Gerlach, along with The Sherwood Singers, Fred Thompson, The Willow Creek Ramblers, The Steeltown II, David & Michaela, LeSesne Hilton with John MacQuarrie, Randy Boone and the Calimbo Steel Band appeared at Pasadena's 1st Annual Folk Festival which was held at 568 East Mount Curve Avenue, Altadena, Los Angeles County.

In 1968, his album Songs My Mother Never Sang was released on the Takoma label.

It was reported in the 16 March 1977 issue of Walrus! that Gerlach's record was getting heavy airplay at WSAC-FM in Kentucky.

== Discography ==
=== Albums ===
- Twelve-String Guitar a.k.a. Folk Songs And Blues Sung And Played By Fred Gerlach With Twelve-String Guitar. Folkways Records lp FG 3529, (1962)
- Songs My Mother Never Sang Takoma lp C-1028. (1968)
- Easy Rider Eyrie Records, (1993)

=== Compilations ===
- The Twelve-String Story Vol. 1 (1963)
- The Twelve-String Story Vol. 2 (1963)
- The Guitar Greats
- Golden Guitars
- Takoma Eclectic Sampler Vol 2 (1999)
- Imaginational Anthem Vol. 2
