= Byron Arnold Collection =

The Byron Arnold collection is an archival collection of folksong recordings and transcriptions from Alabama, held at the University of Alabama. The collection was used to publish a 1950 book, Folksongs of Alabama, and later reused for the 2004 Alabama songbook. Several albums have also been published from the collection.

== History of the collection ==
Byron Arnold began collecting Alabama folksongs after joining the piano and organ faculty at the University of Alabama Department of Music in 1937–8. In summer 1945, he made a collecting trip without recording devices.

In 1947, with funding for recording devices, Arnold made field recordings of Alabama music with support from the Folklife Program of the Alabama State Council on the Arts and the Alabama Folklife Association Materials were collected before 1950.

The collection, including reel-to-reel tapes, recording discs, and written transcriptions, was donated to the university upon collector Byron Arnold's death in 1971.

== Notable singers recorded ==
- Vera Hall

== Output ==
The collection has generated 2 books of folksongs, 2 recorded albums, and several scholarly works.

=== Books ===
- Folksongs of Alabama, 1950.
- Alabama Songbook, edited by Robert Halli Jr. University of Alabama Press, 2004.

=== Recordings ===
- Cornbread Crumbled in Gravy: Historical Alabama Field Recording from the Byron Arnold Collection of Traditional Tunes, produced by Joy Baklanoff, 1984, for the Alabama Folklife Association. Annotations by folklorist John Bealle
- Bullfrog Jumped: Children's Folksongs From the Byron Arnold Collection, 2007, Alabama Folklife Association

=== Selected Printed Works using the Collection ===
- Alabama folk songs in the elementary music class: the Byron Arnold Collection. by Deborah Ann Harhai. Thesis (M.A.)--University of Alabama, 1983.
- Traditional black musical events in West Alabama and Northeast Mississippi, 1940-1960 by Joy Driskell Baklanoff in Essays in honor of Frank J. Gillis, Bloomington, Indiana: Ethnomusicology Publications Group, Indiana University, 1991.

=== Archival & historical materials ===
- Byron Arnold Collection of archival materials at the University of Alabama, Byron Arnold collection, 1939-1977, 8.2 linear feet
- Description of the collection, by the collector: Some Historical Folk Songs from Alabama. by Byron Arnold. Journal of the International Folk Music Council. Vol. 6, (1954), pp. 45–47. International Council for Traditional Music
