= Best of the M.C. Records Years 1999–2005 =

Best of the M.C. Records Years 1999-2005

Greatest hits album by Odetta
- Released: 2006
- Genre: Folk, blues
- Label: Acadia

Odetta chronology
Gonna Let It Shine (2005)	Best of the M.C. Records Years 1999-2005 (2006)	Vanguard Visionaries (2007)

Professional ratings
Review scores
Source	Rating
Allmusic	4/5 stars

Best of the M.C. Records Years 1999–2005 is a compilation album by American folk singer Odetta, released in 2006. It contains songs she recorded on the M.C. Records label.

== Track listing ==
All songs Traditional unless otherwise noted.

1. "Blues Everywhere I Go" (Scott Shirley) – 4:53
2. "Goodnight, Irene" (Lead Belly, Alan Lomax) – 4:58
3. "Please Send Me Someone to Love" (Percy Mayfield) – 2:34
4. "This Little Light of Mine" (Harry Loes) – 4:43
5. "Bourgeois Blues" (Huddie Ledbetter) – 4:33
6. "Trouble in Mind" (Big Bill Broonzy) – 4:27
7. "New Orleans" (Broonzy) – 4:43
8. "Freedom Trilogy: Oh Freedom/Come & Go with Me/I'm on My Way" – 6:34
9. "Two Little Fishes and Five Loaves of Bread" (Bernie Haneghen) – 3:24
10. "Roberta" (Ledbetter, Lomax) – 5:36
11. "Can't Afford to Lose My Man" (Ernest Lawlars) – 2:56
12. "Midnight Special" (Ledbetter) – 4:54
13. "Poor Little Jesus" – 2:17
14. "Alabama Bound/Boll Weevil" (Leadbelly, Traditional) – 7:20
15. "What Month Was Jesus Born In?" – 1:48
16. "Oh, Papa" (Davide Elman) – 3:01
17. "You Gotta Know How" (Sippie Wallace) – 3:38

== Personnel ==
- Odetta – vocals
- Henry Butler – piano
- Mark Carpentieri – drums
- Richard Crooks – drums
- Popsy Dixon – drums
- Dr. John – piano, vocals
- Seth Farber – piano, organ
- Sherman Holmes – bass
- Wendell Holmes – guitar, piano
- Freddy Koella – violin
- Michael Merritt – bass
- Shawn Pelton – drums
- Pinetop Perkins – piano
- Jim Saporito – percussion
- Brad Vickers – bass
- Jimmy Vivino – guitar (electric, acoustic, and 12-string), banjo
- Kim Wilson – harmonica

== Production notes ==
- Liner Notes by Alan Robinson
