= Odetta at Town Hall =

Live album by Odetta
- Released: 1962
- Recorded: The Town Hall, New York
- Genre: Folk, blues
- Length: 46:11
- Label: Vanguard

Odetta chronology
Sometimes I Feel Like Cryin' (1962)	Odetta at Town Hall (1962)	One Grain of Sand (1963)

Odetta at Town Hall is a live album by American folk singer Odetta, recorded at Town Hall, New York, NY. At this time, Odetta was at the height of her career and performed an annual concert at the venue, typically in the month of April. It is not clear if this is her 1961 or 1962 concert performance. It could potentially be a compilation of her performances at Town Hall throughout the early 1960s. This album was first issued in 1962, as per the Vanguard Discography logs. The internet and some CD reissues will sometimes incorrectly report that this album was released in 1963.

The Odetta at Town Hall album and One Grain of Sand, were both released after Odetta had made the decision to leave Vanguard Records and start recording for RCA Victor in early1962.

At Town Hall is also available along with At Carnegie Hall from the same era, on Vanguard's double-LP The Essential Odetta, but the CD version of that release omits eight songs from the Town Hall LP and two songs from the Carnegie Hall LP.

Professional ratings
Review scores
Source	Rating
AllMusic	3/5 stars

== Track listing ==
1. "Let Me Ride" (Traditional spiritual) – 1:34
2. "The Fox" (Traditional) – 1:51
3. "Santy Anno" (Traditional) – 2:35
4. "Devilish Mary" (Traditional) – 1:56
5. "Another Man Done Gone" (Vera Hall, Alan Lomax, John Lomax, Ruby Pickens Tartt) – 2:33
6. "Children's Trilogy" (Jimmy Driftwood) – 2:07
7. "He Had a Long Chain On" (Traditional) – 6:26
8. "He's Got the Whole World in His Hands" (Traditional spiritual) – 2:06
9. "Take This Hammer" (Traditional) – 3:57
10. "Ox Driver" (Traditional; arranged and adapted by Bob Corman and Harry Belafonte) – 3:07
11. "Hound Dog" (Traditional) – 4:44
12. "Carry It Back to Rosie" (Traditional) – 3:27
13. "What Month Was Jesus Born In?" (Traditional spiritual) – 2:22
14. "The Frozen Logger" (Ivar Haglund, James Stevens) – 2:52
15. "Timber" (Sam Gray, Josh White) – 3:26
16. "Freedom Trilogy: Oh Freedom/ Come and Go with Me/ I'm on My Way" (Traditional) – 7:29

== Personnel ==
- Odetta Holmes – vocals, guitar
- Bill Lee – bass
