= Looking for a Home (album) =

Studio album by Odetta
- Released: 2001
- Genre: Folk, blues
- Length: 66:12
- Label: M.C.
- Producer: Seth Farber, Mark Carpentieri

Odetta chronology
| Absolutely the Best (2000) | Looking for a Home (2001) | The Tradition Masters (2002) |

Professional ratings
Review scores
| Source | Rating |
|---|---|
| AllMusic | 3/5 stars |

Looking for a Home is an album by American folk singer Odetta, released in 2001. It consists of songs written and/or performed by Huddie Ledbetter, better known as Leadbelly. It was her 18th and final studio album.

== Track listing ==
All songs by Huddie Ledbetter, also known as Leadbelly, unless otherwise noted.

1. "Goodnight, Irene" (Leadbelly, Alan Lomax) – 4:59
2. "You Don't Know My Mind" – 4:32
3. "Mother's Blues (Little Children Blues)" – 3:47
4. "When I Was a Cowboy" – 3:12
5. "In the Pines" – 4:04
6. "How Long" – 4:30
7. "Bourgeois Blues" – 4:33
8. "Alabama Bound/Boll Weevil" (Leadbelly, Traditional) – 7:21
9. "Roberta" (Ledbetter, Lomax) – 5:36
10. "New Orleans" – 4:43
11. "Jim Crow Blues" – 3:18
12. "Rock Island Line" – 3:02
13. "Julie Anne Johnson/Whoa Black Buck" (Ledbetter, Traditional) – 2:48
14. "Easy Rider" – 5:11
15. "Midnight Special" – 4:36

== Personnel ==
- Odetta Felious Holmes – vocals
- Clarence "Gatemouth" Brown – violin
- Henry Butler – piano
- Richard Crooks – drums
- Seth Farber – piano, organ
- Freddy Koella – mandolin, violin
- Mike Merritt – bass
- Shawn Pelton – drums
- Jim Saporito – percussion
- Jimmy Vivino – banjo, guitar
- Kim Wilson – harmonica
