= One Grain of Sand =

1963 folk album by Odetta

Studio album by Odetta
- Released: January 1, 1963
- Recorded: 1962
- Genres: Folk, blues
- Length: 41:21
- Label: Vanguard

Odetta chronology
Odetta at Town Hall (1962)	One Grain of Sand (1963)	Odetta Sings Folk Songs (1963)

One Grain of Sand is a studio album by the American folk singer and guitarist Odetta. It was released in January 1963 through Vanguard Records, and is her last album for the label. It was re-released on CD in 1997.

Professional ratings
Review scores
Source	Rating
Allmusic	3/5 stars

== Track listing ==
All songs Traditional unless otherwise noted.

1. "Sail Away, Ladies" – 2:41
2. "Moses, Moses" (John Davis, Alan Lomax) – 3:00
3. "Midnight Special" – 3:26
4. "Rambler-Gambler" – 3:22
5. "Cotton Fields" (Lead Belly) – 3:25
6. "Roll On, Buddy" – 3:04
7. "Ain't No Grave" – 2:24
8. "Special Delivery Blues" – 2:41
9. "Rambling Round Your City" (Woody Guthrie) – 4:06
10. "Boll Weevil" – 2:18
11. "Come All Ye Fair and Tender Ladies" – 3:28
12. "She Moved Through the Fair" – 3:05
13. "Cool Water" (Bob Nolan) – 3:08
14. "One Grain of Sand" (Pete Seeger) – 2:09

== Personnel ==
- Odetta – vocals, guitar
- Bill Lee – bass

== Production notes ==
- Design by Jules Halfant
- Photography by Pompeo Posar
