= The Maid Freed from the Gallows =

Folk song

"The Maid Freed from the Gallows" is one of many titles of a centuries-old folk song about a condemned maiden pleading for someone to buy her freedom from the executioner. Other variants and/or titles include "The Gallows Pole", "The Gallis Pole", "Anathea", "Hangman", "The Prickle-Holly Bush", "The Golden Ball", and "Hold Up Your Hand, Old Joshua She Cried". In the collection of ballads compiled by Francis James Child in the late 19th century, it is indexed as Child Ballad number 95; 11 variants, some fragmentary, are indexed as 95A to 95K. The Roud Folk Song Index identifies it as number 144.

The ballad exists in a number of folkloric variants, from many different countries, and has been remade in a variety of formats. For example, it was recorded commercially in 1939 as "The Gallis Pole" by folk singer Huddie "Lead Belly" Ledbetter, and in 1970 as "Gallows Pole", an arrangement of the Fred Gerlach version, by English rock band Led Zeppelin, on the album Led Zeppelin III. Another version is "The Prickly Bush" by English folk rock band Steeleye Span on their 1996 album Time.

== Synopsis ==
There are many versions, all of which recount a similar story. A maiden (a young unmarried woman) or man is about to be hanged (in many variants, for unknown reasons), and pleads with the hangman, or judge, to wait for the arrival of someone who may bribe him. Typically, the first person (or people) to arrive, who may include the condemned person's parent or sibling, has brought nothing and often has come to see them hanged. The last person to arrive, often their true love, has brought the gold, silver, or some other valuable to save them. Although the traditional versions do not resolve the fate of the condemned one way or the other, it may be presumed that the bribe would succeed. Depending on the version, the condemned may curse all those who failed them.

One such refrain goes:

Hangman, hangman, hangman / slack your rope awhile.
I think I see my father / ridin' many a mile.
"Father, did you bring any silver? / father, did you bring any gold,
Or did you come to see me / hangin' from the gallows pole?"
"No, I didn't bring any silver, / no I didn't bring any gold.
I just come to see you / hangin' from the gallows pole."

It has been suggested that the reference to "gold" may not mean actual gold for a bribe, but may instead stand for the symbolic restoration of the condemned person's honor, perhaps by proving their innocence, honesty, or fidelity, or the maiden's virginity. Such an interpretation would explain why a number of the song's variations have the condemned person asking whether the visitors have brought gold or paid the fee. In at least one version the reply is: "I haven't brought you gold / But I have paid your fee."

The song is also known as "The Prickly Bush", or "The Prickilie Bush", a title derived from the oft-used refrain lamenting the maiden's situation by likening it to being caught in a briery bush, which prickles her heart. In versions carrying this theme, the typical refrain may add:

O the prickly bush, the prickly bush,
It pricked my heart full sore;
If ever I get out of the prickly bush,
I'll never get in any more.

== Melody ==
The following is one version of the melody and lyrics, as collected by Reed Smith in McDowell County, West Virginia in 1902, and published in 1925:

== Variants and collected versions ==
Lucy Broadwood published a version of the song in her influential book "English Country songs" (1893). In the early 1900s, Cecil Sharp collected many versions throughout England, from Yorkshire to Somerset, and his notes and transcriptions are available via the Vaughan Williams Memorial Library website.

=== Field recordings ===
Many audio recordings have been made by folk song collectors of traditional versions of the song. The English version of the song tends to be called "The Prickle Holly Bush", several recordings of which were made around the middle of the twentieth century, particularly in the south of England. Folklorist Peter Kennedy recorded Walter Lucas of Sixpenny Handley, Dorset singing a version in 1951, and Sarah Ann Tuck of nearby Chideok singing a similar version the following year. Bob Copper recorded Fred Hewett of Mapledurwell, Hampshire, singing a version in 1955. The song seems far less prevalent in Ireland and Scotland.

Several American versions have been recorded, particularly in the Appalachian region, where English folk songs had been preserved. Frank Proffitt of Pick Britches, North Carolina was recorded by W. Amos Abrams in c. 1939. Jean Ritchie of Viper, Kentucky sang a traditional version learnt from family members, which was recorded by Alan Lomax (1949) and Kenneth Goldstein (1961) and released on the album "The Best of Jean Ritchie" (1961) with a mountain dulcimer accompaniment. Sarah Ogan Gunning, another Kentuckian, sang a similar version to collector Mark Wilson in 1974. An unusual version sung by Mrs. Lena Bare Turbyfill of Elk Park, North Carolina was collected by Herbert Halpert in 1939 as part of a WPA project. Her version is notable for being the only recorded version that mentions the theft of a "golden key" as the reason for the protagonist's execution.

=== Lyrics ===
Francis James Child called the English language version "defective and distorted", in that, in most cases, the narrative rationale had been lost and only the ransoming sequence remained. Numerous European variants explain the reason for the ransom: the heroine has been captured by pirates. Of the texts he prints, one (95F) had "degenerated" into a children's game, while others had survived as part of a Northern English cante-fable, The Golden Ball (or Key).

The most extensive version is not a song at all, but a fairy story titled "The Golden Ball", re-published by Joseph Jacobs in More English Fairy Tales, from Henderson's Folk-Lore of the Northern Counties where it had originally been contributed by Sabine Barring-Gould. The story focuses on the exploits of the fiancé who must recover a golden ball in order to save his love from the noose. The incident resembles The Story of the Youth Who Went Forth to Learn What Fear Was. Other fairy tales in the English language, telling the story more fully, always retell some variant on the heroine's being hanged for losing an object of gold.

== Commercial recordings ==
=== Lead Belly version ===
Folksinger Huddie "Lead Belly" Ledbetter, who also popularized such songs as "Cotton Fields" and "Midnight Special", first recorded "The Gallis Pole" in the 1930s accompanied by his own twelve-string guitar. His haunting, shrill tenor delivers the lyrical counterpoint, and his story is punctuated with spoken-word passages, as he "interrupts his song to discourse on its theme".

Country blues trio Koerner, Ray & Glover covered the Lead Belly version on their 1963 debut album Blues, Rags and Hollers, under the title "Hangman".

=== John Jacob Niles versions ===
Folk singer John Jacob Niles recorded the song at least twice: On March 25, 1940, as "The Maid Freed from the Gallows", re-issued on the compilation album My Precarious Life in the Public Domain, then in April 1960 in a more dramatic version as "The Hangman" on his album The Ballads of John Jacob Niles.

=== Odetta version ===
Folksinger Odetta released the song under the title "The Gallows Pole" on her third album At the Gate of Horn in 1957 and on her live album Odetta at Carnegie Hall, recorded on April 8, 1960.

=== Judy Collins and Bob Dylan versions ===
Judy Collins performed the song "Anathea" throughout 1963 (including a rendition at the 1963 Newport Folk Festival), credited to Neil Roth and Lydia Wood. It is thematically similar to the Hungarian "Fehér László", even to the detail of the names of the characters (Anathea and Laszlo Feher). It appeared on her third album, Judy Collins 3, released in early 1964.

Bob Dylan recorded a thematically similar "Seven Curses" in 1963, during the sessions for his The Times They Are A-Changin' album. Dylan first performed the song in April 1963 at his Town Hall concert, and would perform it again at his October 1963 Carnegie Hall show. The song tells a similar story but from the point of view of the condemned's daughter. Here, it is not the maiden who is to be hanged but her father, for stealing a stallion. The woman offers to buy her father's freedom from the judge, who responds: "Gold will never free your father/ the price my dear is you, instead". The maiden pays the judge's terrible price but wakes the next morning to find that her father has been hanged, anyway. Dylan's development of the song came soon after his return from England where he met A.L. "Bert" Lloyd who has claimed credit for translating into English the above referenced Hungarian folksong.

=== Derry Gaol/The Streets of Derry ===
An Irish version of the song, entitled "Derry Gaol" or "The Streets of Derry" (Roud number 896), has the young man marching through the streets of Derry "more like a commanding officer / Than a man to die upon the gallows tree". As he mounts the gallows, his true love comes riding, bearing a pardon from the Queen (or the King). It was first recorded by County Armagh singer Sarah Makem on The Folk Songs of Britain, Vol. 7: Fair Game and Foul (1961), and subsequently by Shirley Collins, Trees, The Bothy Band, Cara Dillon, Andy Irvine and Paul Brady, June Tabor, Peter Bellamy and Spiers & Boden.

=== Led Zeppelin version ===
"Gallows Pole"
- Advance copy 5:11 stereo single

Promotional single by Led Zeppelin

from the album Led Zeppelin III
- Released: 5 October 1970
- Recorded: 1970
- Studio: Headley Grange, England
- Genre: Folk blues; bluegrass
- Length: 4:58
- Label: Atlantic
- Songwriters: Traditional, arr. by Jimmy Page, Robert Plant
- Producer: Jimmy Page

English band Led Zeppelin recorded the song as "Gallows Pole" for their album Led Zeppelin III in 1970. The album is a shift in style for the band towards acoustic material, influenced by a holiday Jimmy Page and Robert Plant took to the Bron-Yr-Aur cottage in the Welsh countryside. The liner notes include the songwriting credit "Traditional: Arranged by Page and Plant".

Page adapted the song from a version by American folk musician Fred Gerlach, which is included on his 1962 album Twelve-String Guitar for Folkways Records.

==== Composition ====
"Gallows Pole" begins as a simple acoustic guitar rhythm; mandolin is added in, then electric bass guitar shortly afterwards, and then banjo and drums simultaneously join in. The instrumentation builds up to a crescendo, increasing in tempo as the song progresses. The acoustic guitar chord progression (in standard tuning) is simple with a riff based on variations of the open A chord and the chords D and G occurring in the verse. Page played banjo, six- and 12-string acoustic guitar and electric guitar (a Gibson Les Paul), while John Paul Jones played mandolin and bass.

Page has stated that, similar to the song "The Battle of Evermore" that was included on their fourth album, the song emerged spontaneously when he started experimenting with Jones' banjo, an instrument he had never before played. "I just picked it up and started moving my fingers around until the chords sounded right, which is the same way I work on compositions when the guitar's in different tunings." It is also one of Page's favourite songs on Led Zeppelin III.

Led Zeppelin performed the song a few times live during Led Zeppelin concerts in 1971. Page and Plant recorded a live acoustic version for their 1994 album. No Quarter: Jimmy Page and Robert Plant Unledded.

==== Reception ====
In a retrospective review of Led Zeppelin III (Deluxe Edition), Kristofer Lenz of Consequence of Sound gave "Gallows Pole" a positive review, writing the track is "an excellent representation of Page's acoustic prowess, as his simple guitar line is soon joined by 12-string and banjo". Lenz further wrote that Jones joins the fun as well, "as he adds some mandolin flourish to the mix".

=== Tia Blake version ===
Folk-singer Tia Blake recorded it as "Hangman" on her 1972 album "Folksongs & Ballads", replacing "gold" with "hope". In her version, the stanzas are repeated four times: Her father, her mother, her brother, and her true love. The last one has brought her fee.

=== The Watersons version ===
English folk group the Watersons recorded a version called "The Prickle-Holly Bush", with Martin Carthy singing lead, for their 1981 album Green Fields. They learned it from the singing of Bill Whiting, of Longcot, Oxfordshire.

== Variations in other countries ==
Some 50 versions have been reported in Finland, where it is well known as "Lunastettava neito". It is titled "Den Bortsålda" in Swedish and "Die Losgekaufte" in German. A Lithuanian version has the maid asking relatives to ransom her with their best animals or belongings (crown, house, crown, ring, sword, etc.). The maiden curses her relatives who refuse to give up their property and blesses her fiancé, who does ransom her.

In a Hungarian version called "Fehér László", collected by Béla Bartók in several different regions of Hungary and published in his study The Hungarian Folk Song, Fehér Anna's brother László is imprisoned for stealing horses. Anna sleeps with Judge Horváth to free him but is unsuccessful in sparing his life. She then regales the judge with curses.

"Cecilia" is one of the best known and more diffused songs in the Italian popular music. With no reference to any curse, it tells a story not very different from those of "Fehér László" and "Seven Curses". Cecilia's husband has been condemned to be hanged, and she asks the captain how it is possible to spare his life. The captain promises to save her husband if Cecilia sleeps with him, but in the morning Cecilia sees from the window her man has been hanged.

The song is also found in Northern Sami, titled "Nieida Kajon sis", which tells a story that strongly resembles the Lithuanian version. The maid asks her relatives (father, mother, brother, sister, and uncle) to ransom her with their best belongings or animals (horse, cow, sword, crown, and ship).

Francis James Child describes additional examples from the Faroe Islands, Iceland, Russia, and Slovenia, several of which feature a man being ransomed by a woman.

The theme of delaying one's execution while awaiting rescue by relatives appears with a similar structure in the 1697 classic fairy tale "Bluebeard" by Charles Perrault (translated into English in 1729).

== See also ==
- List of the Child Ballads
- The folk ballad "Geordie" also features a rescue from the gallows by a payment.
- List of Led Zeppelin songs written or inspired by others
