= Ruby Pickens Tartt =

American folklorist, writer and painter (1880–1974)

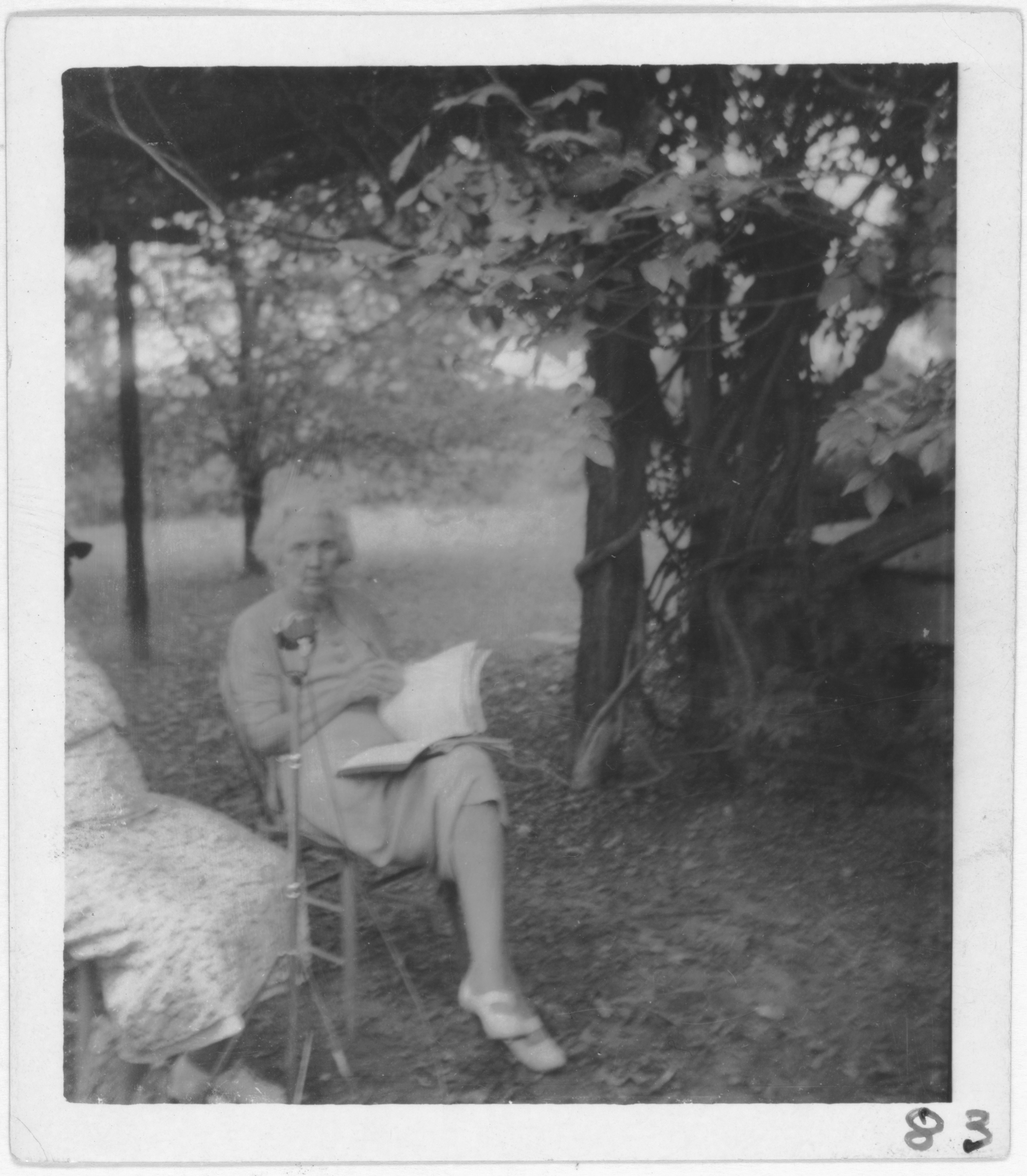
- Tartt at home in Livingston, AL
- Born: Ruby Pickens; January 13, 1880; Livingston, AL
- Died: November 29, 1974 (aged 94); York, AL
- Occupations: folklorist, writer

Ruby Pickens Tartt (January 13, 1880 - September 29, 1974) was an American folklorist, writer, and painter who is known for her work helping to preserve Southern black culture by collecting the life histories, stories, lore, and songs of former slaves for the Works Progress Administration and the Library of Congress. In 1980 she was inducted into the Alabama Women's Hall of Fame.

== Early life and education ==
Ruby Pickens was born Jan. 13, 1880, in Livingston, Alabama, one of two children of Fannie West Short Pickens and William King Pickens, a prosperous cotton farmer. She was educated first at Livingston Female Academy and then at Sophia Newcomb College and the Alabama State Normal College, where she studied under Julia Tutwiler.

In 1901, Ruby went to New York to studied painting with William Merritt Chase at the Chase School of Art. She developed her own style based on Chase's method of painting directly onto unprepared canvas without any preliminary drawing. Tartt later taught art in her hometown, and some of her portraits, still lifes, and landscapes hang in Alabama public buildings.

Ruby married William Pratt Tartt, a banker, in 1904. They had one child, Fannie Pratt Tratt (Inglis).

== Field trips and song recordings ==
In the Great Depression, Tartt and her husband suffered financial difficulties. Needing work, Tartt got a job with the Works Progress Administration (WPA) in York, AL. In 1936, she was appointed chair of the WPA's local Federal Writers' Project (FWP) in Sumter County. Through the FWP, she began collecting the life histories, stories, lore, and songs of the area's former slaves. Her activities drew the attention of ethnomusicologist John Lomax, who was then recording songs for the Library of Congress (LOC). In 1937 Lomax joined Tartt for a joint expedition collecting folk songs around Sumter County; together they gathered over 300 songs. Tartt went on several further expeditions both on her own and with Lomax gathering more material for the LOC's Archive of American Folk Songs. In 1939 and 1940, they collected recordings of over 800 songs and stories and over 80 photographs of singers. One of the singers Tartt recorded was Vera Hall, now considered one of the twentieth century's finest blues and folk singers.

Tartt worked with Lomax and his son Alan (another folklorist) on the folk music collections entitled Afro-American Spirituals, Work Songs, and Ballads and Afro-American Blues and Game Songs. Tartt also worked with folklorist Ellie Seigmeister and with University of Alabama music professor Byron Arnold gathering material for his collection entitled Folksongs of Alabama, and she provided some material for poet Carl Sandburg's 1950 anthology New American Songbag.

Later in the 1950s, she joined forces with folklorist Harold Courlander, who was then working with Folkways Records. Their collaboration led to Sumter County singers being included in a half dozen early collections including Folk Music U.S.A., Negro Folk Music of Alabama, Negro Songs of Alabama, and Negro Folk Music U.S.A.

One of Tartt's friends was the writer Carl Carmer, who taught English at the University of Alabama. He credited Tartt with providing a considerable amount of local material like songs and customs for his 1934 book Stars Fell on Alabama. Carmer also based a character in this book (Mary Louise) on Tartt.

== Writing and later life ==
In the 1940s, Tartt turned to writing fiction, often based in part on the materials she had gathered during her WPA years. In 1945, her short story "A Pair of Blue Stockings" was included in both Houghton Mifflin's Best American Short Stories and the Yearbook of the American Short Story. She signed a contract with Houghton Mifflin for a collection of stories based on Southern folklore but it was never published. In 1945, she lost her home and many of her notes to a tornado that also injured her right hand. Although she continued to write and paint until the end of her life, she had difficulty with both.

Tartt received some royalties from a few recordings based on her discoveries, notably from The Kingston Trio and Harry Belafonte, but not enough to make her financially independent. She supported herself as a librarian from 1940 to 1964.

Tartt died on November 29, 1974, in York, Alabama.

== Legacy and honors ==
In 1975, the public library in Livingston was named the Ruby Pickens Tartt Library in her honor.

In 1980, she was inducted into the Alabama Women's Hall of Fame.

Some 5000 of Tartt's folkloric manuscripts are held by the University of West Alabama.
