= My Eyes Have Seen =

- Original LP cover

Studio album by Odetta
- Released: July 1959
- Genre: Folk, blues
- Length: 40:16
- Label: Vanguard

Odetta chronology
At the Gate of Horn (1957)	My Eyes Have Seen (1959)	Ballad For Americans and Other American Ballads (1960)

Alternative Cover
- The CD re-issue of My Eyes Have Seen

My Eyes Have Seen is a studio album by the American folk singer Odetta. It was released in July 1959 through Vanguard Records, and is her first album for the label.

Milt Okun arranged and conducted a choir on a portion of the songs, notably "Motherless Children", "Ox-Driver Song" and the title piece.

My Eyes Have Seen was re-released on CD in 1994.

== Reception ==
Professional ratings
Review scores
Source	Rating
Allmusic	4/5 stars

In his review for Allmusic, critic Ronnie D. Lankford wrote of the album, "While it might be hard for a post-millennium roots fan to understand, Odetta—in her heyday—was the kind of folk artist who drove purists crazy.... My Eyes Have Seen is a nice portrait of a performer bucking conformity as she stretches her artistic legs a bit.."

== Track listing ==
All songs Traditional unless otherwise noted.

1. "Poor Little Jesus" – 1:54
2. "Bald Headed Woman" – 2:20
3. "Motherless Children" – 2:10
4. "I Know Where I'm Going" – 2:00
5. "The Foggy Dew" (Canon Charles O’Neill) – 5:29
6. "I've Been Driving on Bald Mountain/Water Boy" (Avery Robinson) – 6:54
7. "Ox-Driver Song" – 2:35
8. "Down on Me" – 2:55
9. "Saro Jane" – 2:45
10. "Three Pigs" – 1:18
11. "No More Cane on the Brazos" – 3:38
12. "Jumpin' Judy" – 2:26
13. "Battle Hymn of the Republic" (Julia Ward Howe) – 3:52

== Personnel ==
- Odetta Holmes – vocals, guitar
- Bill Lee – bass
