= Make Me a Pallet on the Floor =

American blues song

"Make Me a Pallet on the Floor" (Roud 13930; also "Make Me a Pallet on your Floor", "Make Me a Pallet", or "Pallet on the Floor") is a blues/jazz/folk song. It is considered a standard. As Jelly Roll Morton explained, "A pallet is something that – you get some quilts – in other words, it's a bed that's made on a floor without any four posters on 'em."

== Structure ==
The melody is 16 bars long. One writer describes the structure as "a proto-blues [...that] has little in common musically with regular blues". When played in the key of C, the typical structure is:

F	F	C	C
F	F	C	C
C	E^{7}	Am	Fm^{6}
C	D^{7}G^{7}	C	C

== History ==
The composition probably originates from the end of the nineteenth century. One jazz historian states that the song "could have been sung around New Orleans in the mid-1890s." A 1906 report in the Indianapolis Freeman referred to a performance of the song by "The Texas Teaser, Bennie Jones". It appeared in sheet music in 1908 as part of "Blind Boone's Southern Rag Medley No. One: Strains from the Alleys." "The lyrics first appear in a 1911 article by folklorist Howard Odum, who had transcribed them from a performance he had heard in Mississippi a few years before."

Some sources attribute the modern score to W. C. Handy, who later modified it into a song known as "Atlanta Blues". He published "Atlanta Blues" in 1923, featuring lyrics credited to Dave Elman. The first recording of the melody appears in Handy's band's 1917 performance of "Sweet Child", which was written by Stovall and Ewing.

Early recordings of the song were made by numerous musicians, including Virginia Liston ("Make Me a Pallet", OKeh 8247, 1925), Ethel Waters, ("Make Me a Pallet on the Floor", Columbia 14125-D, 1926), Mississippi John Hurt ("Ain't No Tellin'", OKeh 8759, 1928); and country music duo the Stripling Brothers ("Pallet on the Floor", Decca 5367, 1936).

During a live session captured by Alan Lomax, Delta blues guitarist and singer Sam Chatmon accounted, "When I first started picking guitar it was about the first or the second [song] I learned ... [I] was about 4 years old", making it the year 1901 when Sam learned the song in Bolton, Mississippi.
