= Betsy Bakker-Nort =

Politics and law (1874–1946)

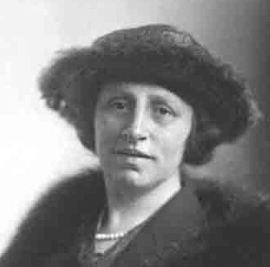
- Betsy Bakker-Nort in 1922

Member of the House of Representatives
- In office 1922–1942

Personal details
- Born: Bertha Nort; 8 May 1874 Groningen, Netherlands
- Died: 23 May 1946 (aged 72) Utrecht, Netherlands
- Party: VDB
- Education: University of Groningen; University of Utrecht

Bertha "Betsy" Bakker-Nort (8 May 1874 – 23 May 1946) was a Dutch lawyer and politician who served as a member of the House of Representatives for the Free-thinking Democratic League (VDB) from 1922 to 1942.

Born in Groningen, she became involved with the feminist movement in 1894, joining the Dutch Association for Women's Suffrage (VVVK), where she was mentored by Aletta Jacobs, one of the pioneering activists of the 19th century.

At age 34, Bakker-Nort started studying law at the University of Groningen after realising that fighting for women's rights required a thorough understanding of the law. In the 1922 general election, the first in which women were allowed to vote, she was elected to parliament and became the VDB's first female representative. She was re-elected four times and, during her time in the chamber, mainly argued the case for more women's rights concerning marriage and labour law. She was also active internationally, taking a leading role in preparing the International Woman Suffrage Alliance's actions for the 1930 League of Nations conference on international law. In 1933, she acted as a judge in a counter-trial in London of the arson case of the Reichstag fire.

After the German invasion of the Netherlands in May 1940, Bakker-Nort did not return to parliament. From December 1942, she was interned at Westerbork transit camp and Camp Barneveld before the Germans moved her in September 1944 to the Theresienstadt concentration camp in Bohemia. She was liberated in June 1945. She died the following year. According to VDB chairman Pieter Oud, Bakker-Nort had accomplished the task Jacobs had given her: leading the women's movement.

== Early life ==
Bertha "Betsy" Nort was born on 8 May 1874 in Groningen, Netherlands, the youngest of four daughters of a non-religious Jewish couple, Joseph Nort and Wilhelmina van der Wijk. Her father, a merchant, died when she was very young. She grew up mostly around women, including two maids. She later said that, as a young girl, it struck her as unfair that her independent mother was not allowed to vote in local council elections, "yet each man was, no matter how dumb". After finishing secondary school, she travelled to Sweden to study Scandinavian languages. She translated around 40 Danish, Norwegian and Swedish works, including feminist novels and children's books, into Dutch. She observed that in Scandinavia, a woman's position in society was much better than in the Netherlands.

== Activism ==
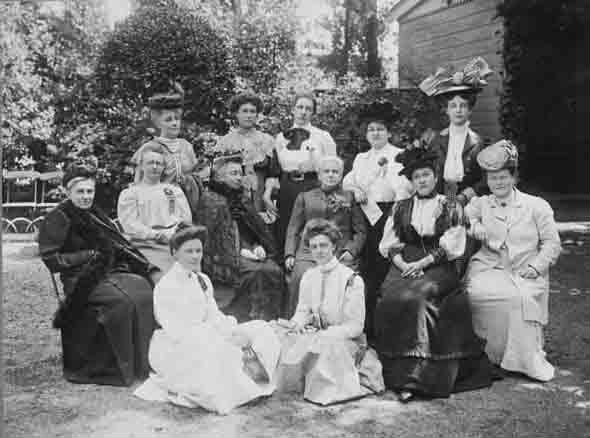
Bakker-Nort (standing, right) at the International Woman Suffrage Alliance conference held in June 1908 in Amsterdam

After returning to the Netherlands in 1894, Nort became actively involved in the first wave of Dutch feminism. She joined the Dutch Association for Women's Suffrage (VVVK), and helped start its local Groningen chapter. Together with Aletta Jacobs, she went door to door to recruit new members. Jacobs, a fellow Groninger who was 20 years Nort's senior, was the first female student at a Dutch university and was one of the founders of the VVVK. She became Nort's mentor. In his 2007 history of the Free-thinking Democratic League (VDB), Meine Henk Klijnsma wrote that Jacobs likely recruited Nort for the VDB. They went from town to town to advocate for women's rights in speeches. In 1899 Nort started writing about women's issues, drawing upon her Scandinavian experience; her early work was published as columns in the feminist magazine Belang en Recht ("The Importance of the Law"). The historian Marianne Braun wrote that this early work showed her calm and determined approach and social-liberal orientation. In 1904, she married Gerrid Bakker, who was a grain merchant, translator, and fellow member of the VVVK, and changed her name to Bakker-Nort. They had no children.

In 1908, at age 34, Bakker-Nort started studying law at the University of Groningen after realising that the fight for women's rights required comprehensive legal knowledge. She said that the husband's marital power was solely based on his ability to vote and elect policymakers. She was the 14th woman to enrol at the University of Groningen. Bakker-Nort finished her degree in 1912. Two years later, she earned a doctorate from the University of Utrecht for her thesis on the legal position of married women across Western Europe. Bakker-Nort was the first woman to earn a doctorate in law at a Dutch university based on a fully-fledged research study. From her comparative study, she concluded that the position of Dutch married women was most unfavourable, not because the laws were that different, but because the Dutch courts interpreted them in a stricter way. Unable to restrict herself to comparisons, she added a reasoned plea for abolishing the part of the marital law that declared married women "incompetent to act". As described in the 1838 civil code, the status of married women was legally similar to that of minors and people with severe mental health problems. (Note: In the country's first civil code, dating from 1809 and based on the Napoleonic Code, which in turn borrowed heavily from Roman private law, the rights of married women were limited in ways similar to what the Romans called "patria potestas".) This meant that married women could not open a bank account, apply for a mortgage or insurance, or sign a labour agreement without their husbands' permission. Similar laws existed in other countries. After completing her thesis Bakker-Nort started to work as a lawyer and attorney, first in Groningen and, from 1930 onwards, in the Hague. She acted as the main legal expert for the VVVK.

Bakker-Nort considered getting women the right to vote to be a principal means to achieve the overhaul of marriage law, a standard view among first wave feminists. She said that getting the vote was essential to make progress on women's issues and that it was a fundamental right for women to have a say in all matters. In 1917 Dutch women obtained the right to stand in elections (passive suffrage), though they could not vote (active suffrage). Bakker-Nort continued to campaign with the VVVK for active suffrage. The women's suffrage campaign was won in 1919, when the women's right to vote became law, instigated by the VDB's Henri Marchant. Once the VVVK had achieved its goal, it changed its name to Association of Women Citizens (VVS) and widened its scope to gain more rights for women. Bakker-Nort co-authored a report for the VVS outlining provisions she thought should be included in a modern marriage law and wrote in a column in its monthly magazine that the old laws, which made married women legally incapacitated, denied them any say over their children and property and thus needed to be reformed. She singled out women's legal status of "incompetent to act", calling it humiliating. She joined the Association of Women with Higher Education (VVAO), a more conservative group than the VVVK which did not always appreciate her progressive ideas and, for example, did not include her in their legal committee, despite her expertise.

== Political career ==
=== 1918–1924 ===
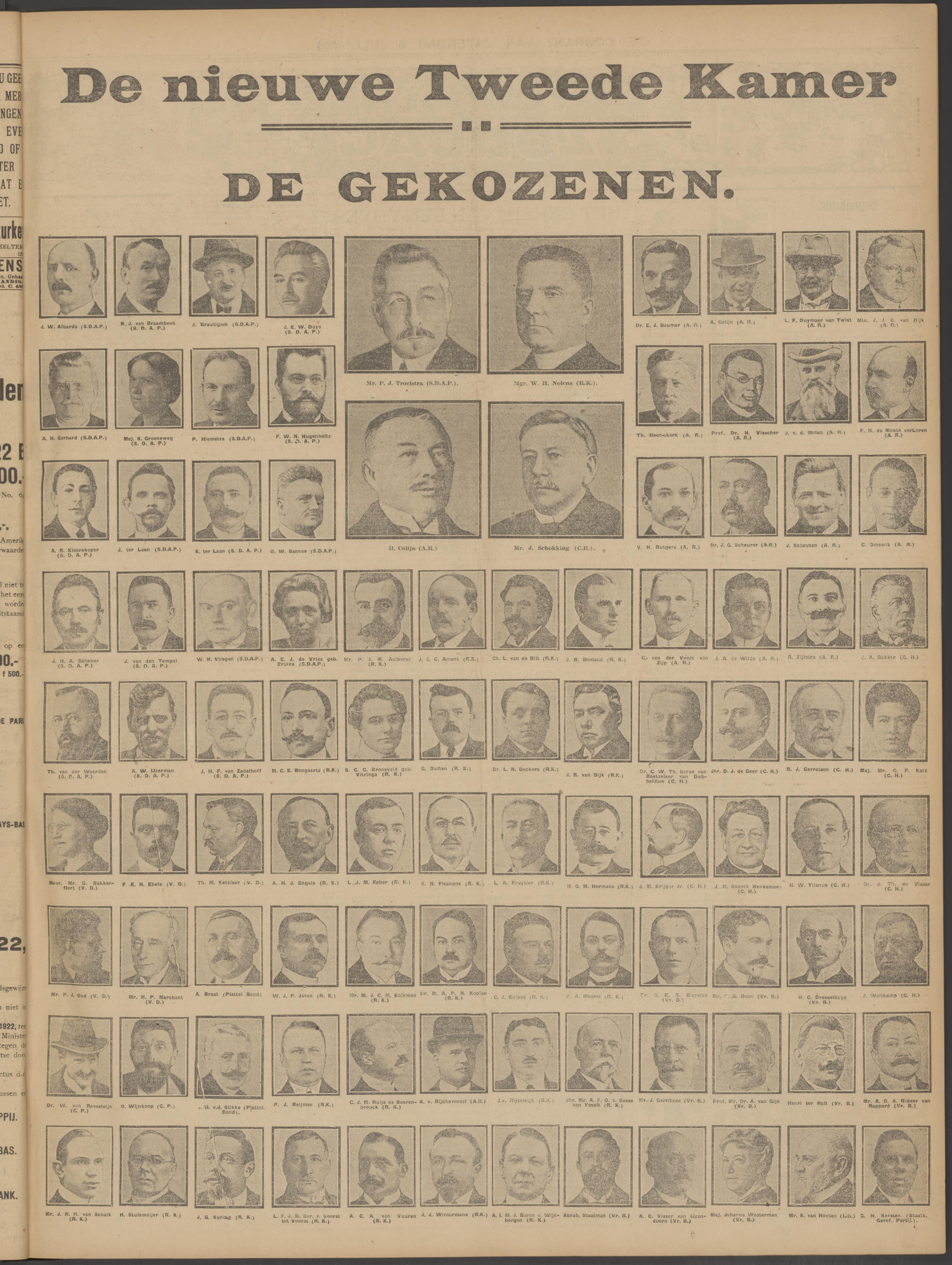
Bakker-Nort was one of seven women elected in the 1922 general election.

By 1918, Bakker-Nort was one of two female board members of the VDB, Mien van Itallie-Van Embden being the other. In the 1918 general elections, the VDB reserved two spots for women on their candidate list and assigned them to Bakker-Nort and her mentor Jacobs. Both Bakker-Nort and Jacobs failed to be elected. However, Suze Groeneweg of the Social Democratic Workers' Party did succeed and became the first female member of the House of Representatives.

For the 1922 election, the first one in which women could vote, the VDB decided that a woman should be assigned the second position on its list of candidates, behind Marchant, whose bill had given women the vote. Due to serious illness, Jacobs could not take the position. Instead, it was given to Bakker-Nort, whom Jacobs saw as her successor. The party's election campaign focussed on legal reform, including the abolition of the Senate, the introduction of referendums, and the strengthening of the legal position of women. The VDB retained its five seats, and Bakker-Nort was elected member of the House of Representatives in July 1922 as the party's first female representative. She was one of seven women elected altogether out of 100 members. In her maiden speech, she introduced parliament to her views of the "scandalous" marriage law.

In her first year, Bakker-Nort introduced a bill for a so-called "sister-pension", to entitle sisters who had lived with and looked after widowed brothers to the right to their pension once they died. The bill passed in the House but failed in the Senate. Also, in her first year, she tried to amend the Ruijs de Beerenbrouck government's proposed legislation to make minor changes to the marriage law, proposing more comprehensive reform with equal rights for women. However, the three Christian parties of the coalition government rejected her amendment. Within the VDB, she was a role model for younger female party members Corry Tendeloo and Nancy Zeelenberg.

=== 1925–1928 ===
In the run-up to the 1925 election, Bakker-Nort argued the case in parliament against a government bill to allow councils to fire female teachers at state schools once they married, but with the majority of the House being members of Christian parties and opposing this, her arguments to stop the bill failed. Moreover, she considered it morally unacceptable that the state forced women into economic dependency on their husbands, adding that the husband and wife themselves should decide, not the state. Nevertheless, Bakker-Nort was re-elected, and the VDB went from holding five to seven parliamentary seats.

Soon after the First De Geer cabinet was formed, Bakker-Nort planned a new bill to reform marriage law. To that end, she created a broader platform and organised a cross-party committee consisting of members of the Liberal State Party, the Democratic Party, and the VDB. She appointed a male, Samuel van Houten, an 89-year-old veteran of Dutch politics, as the committee's president. Throughout 1927, members of the local chapters of the parties involved made and discussed proposals. However, in 1928, Bakker-Nort again made a plea in parliament to end the legal incompetency of married women, but it was rejected by the Christian majority.

=== 1929–1933 ===
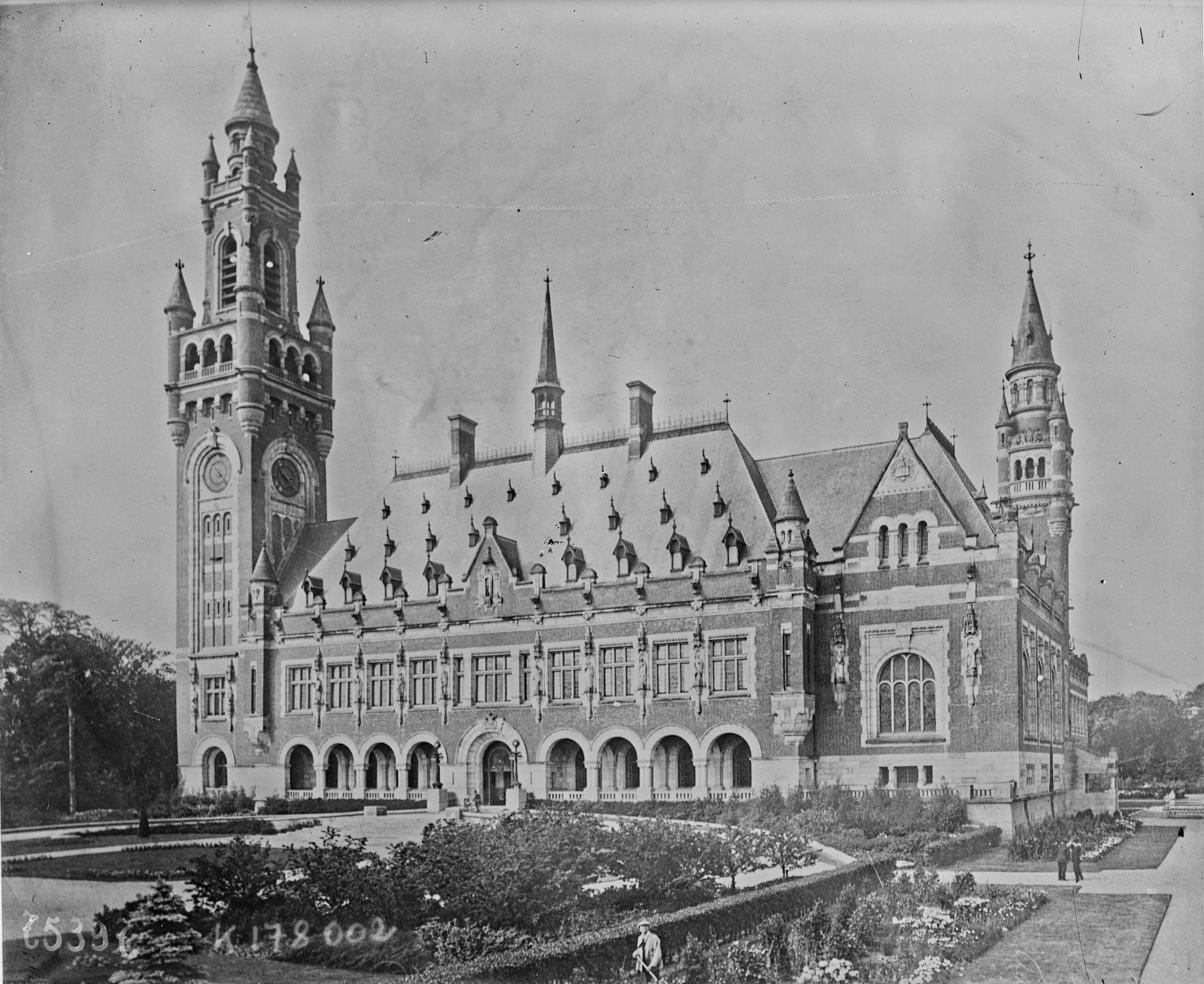
The Peace Palace in the Hague

In the 1929 election, Bakker-Nort kept her seat and was joined by van Itallie-Van Embden as the second female member of the VDB. At the end of the 1920s, Bakker-Nort was moderately optimistic about the future of women's rights in the Netherlands. While she expressed dismay at the fact that women still were banned from taking up public offices such as judge, notary, or mayor, she observed that women within the Catholic organisations were slowly taking up more feminist viewpoints, and she welcomed the first female member of parliament for any Christian party, Frida Katz. However, her optimism soon disappeared when the Great Depression led to fast-rising unemployment, and married women were fired to make way for male job-seekers. Nevertheless, she said that for the VDB, the economic downturn did not alter the principle of the individual’s right of self-determination, of equal pay for equal work, and of equal rights generally.

Bakker-Nort took a leading role in preparing the International Woman Suffrage Alliance's actions for the 1930 League of Nations conference on international law. Women from 35 countries were present at the conference at the Peace Palace in the Hague, though they were not formally invited. The Alliance's main focus was nationality law, as, despite decades-long protests against laws that made married women automatically lose their nationality and take on their husbands', in many countries, little progress had been made towards achieving equality.

The women staged protest marches, carrying their national flags and wearing dresses ranging from white (equality) to black (absolutely unequal). The different dress shades symbolically reflected the gap between the nationality law demanded by the Alliance and the law of the land they represented. Bakker-Nort said the black dresses of the Dutch women amidst colourful ones of other nations created a "rather painful situation" for the hosts and showed how far behind the Netherlands was, as its laws were "still based on the obsolete principle of subjection of women to men". The activists were able to get meetings with the League of Nations delegates but eventually antagonised the conference president so much that he ordered the police to remove the women from the Peace Palace. The Hague Convention resulted in little progress, only preventing women from becoming stateless. Bakker-Nort continued to fight for the right of a married woman to choose to keep her nationality.

During parliamentary debates on retracting the ban on women being appointed mayor, Bakker-Nort ridiculed those who said women lacked physical power by suggesting that, if required, the minister should organise boxing or wrestling matches to appoint suitable candidates. She also pointed out how female mayors performed flawlessly in neighboring countries. Following a vote, the ban was lifted. In 1931, she introduced a bill to remove restrictions on women being appointed notaries, a cause she had been arguing for as early as 1917 but was voted down.

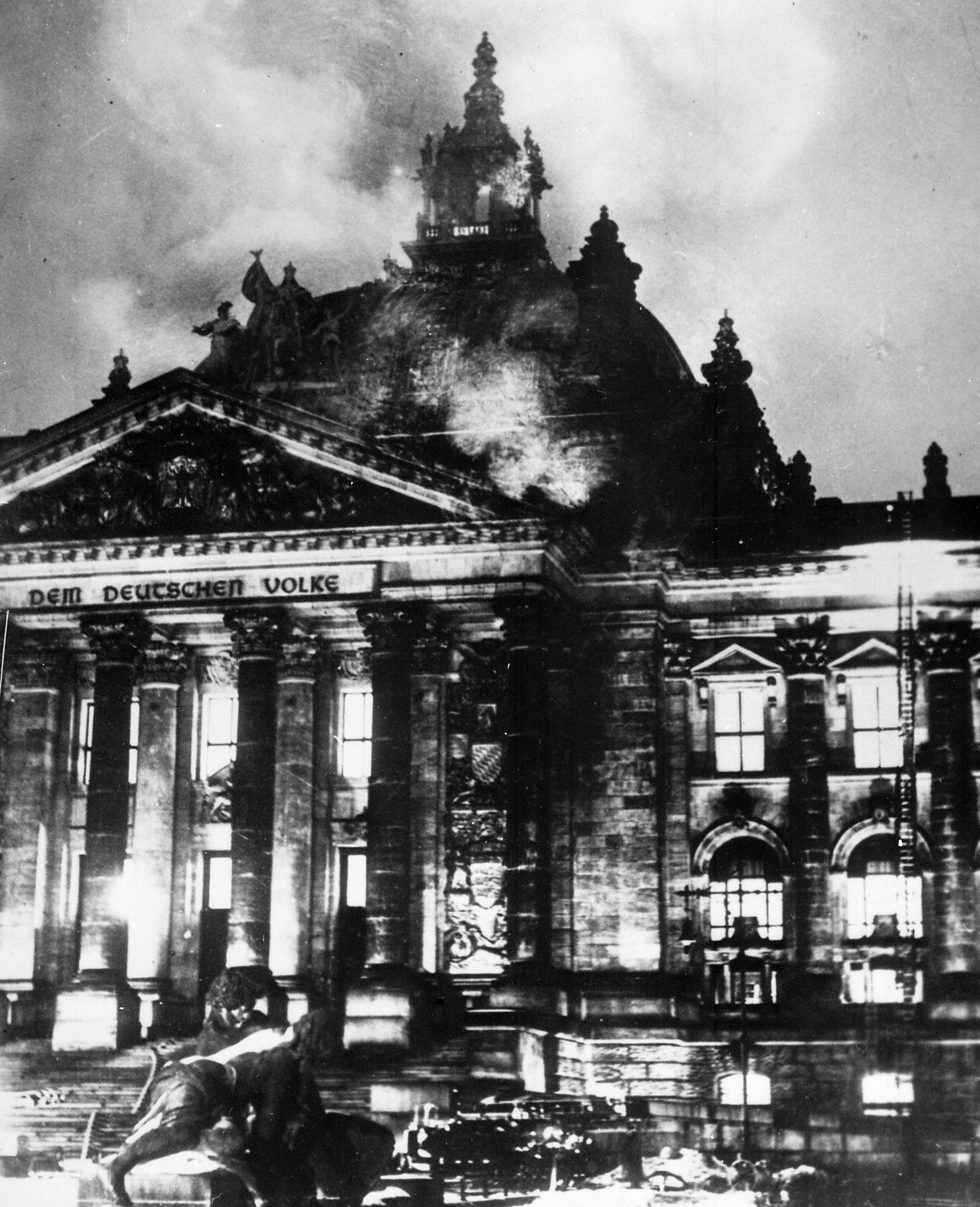
The 1933 Reichstag fire

In 1933 Bakker-Nort accepted an invitation from German communist leader Willi Münzenberg to travel to London and join an international commission of foreign legal experts participating in a counter-trial of the arson case of the Reichstag fire. Five men, all communists, were about to go on trial in Leipzig, but it was feared the Nazis would not give them a fair trial. So, for one week, Bakker-Nort and the other acting judges went through the evidence and concluded that the defendants were innocent and the Nazis were behind the fire.

When the Leipzig judge invited committee members to the proceedings in Germany, Bakker-Nort declined. She denied allegations of bias by critics of the counter-trial and explained that she had taken part because the defendants lacked legal support in Germany, as many lawyers who had defended communists had been imprisoned in Nazi concentration camps, deterring others. After the Leipzig trial found one of the defendants, the Dutchman Marinus van der Lubbe, guilty, and the Nazis executed him, Bakker-Nort lamented the unfair trial, particularly the unlawfulness of applying the death penalty based on a law adopted only after the Reichstag fire. She urged the Dutch people to value the freedom and justice that democracy provided and to fight all who aimed to curtail them. (Note: In 2008, 75 years after the fire, the German government granted Van der Lubbe a posthumous pardon.)

=== 1934–1936 ===
As the economic crisis continued, the government intervened in the labour market. Where city councils previously had been allowed to fire female teachers who married, they were now required to do so. This erosion of women's rights was particularly painful for Bakker-Nort because it happened during the Second Colijn cabinet, of which the VDB was one of the coalition parties. She had tried to make the firing of married teachers temporary, but her amendment failed. According to Klijnsma, the VDB had made a mistake in not negotiating the protection of women's rights during the formation of the coalition.

At a parliamentary budget review in 1935, Bakker-Nort condemned Germany's new marriage law, called the German Blood Protection Law, which banned Aryans, a now-obsolete historical race concept describing people of Proto-Indo-European heritage as a racial grouping, from marrying Jews. Both the Netherlands and Germany had signed the 1902 Hague Marriage Convention, which laid out the rules for recognising the validity of international marriages. The new German law caused the Dutch parliament to debate how to apply the rules of the convention to marriages involving German nationals. Bakker-Nort argued that because it was impossible to determine who was Jewish and who was Aryan, the rules of the treaty did not apply, and the Dutch would not have to revoke the convention's agreement. However, she asked Minister Josef van Schaik to revoke it anyway as a sign of protest. Van Schaik agreed with her that the German law would not apply to Dutch Jews but decided not to revoke the agreement.

=== 1937–1940 ===
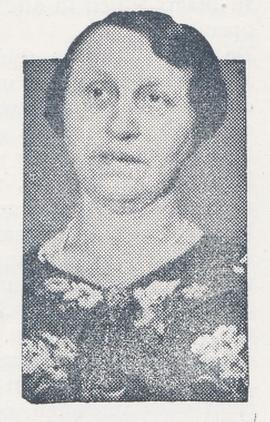
Bakker-Nort c. 1937

In 1937 Bakker-Nort wrote a piece about fascism in the election issue of the VDB's monthly magazine entitled "Democracy or Dictatorship", in which she attacked the fascist party the National Socialist Movement in the Netherlands (NSB) in an unusually sarcastic way. For the 1937 election, the NSB used the image of its leader Anton Mussert and the slogan, "Without this man, the Netherlands does not have a future." Bakker-Nort argued it should say, "With this man, the Netherlands does not have a future, especially the women." The NSB won four seats in parliament, fewer than expected; the VDB retained its six seats and did not return to the new coalition government, the Fourth Colijn cabinet. The election results did not disappoint Bakker-Nort; she said voters had not punished the VDB and had understood why the party had to allow some women's rights to erode. In early 1938 Minister Carl Romme prepared a bill to ban paid work for married women altogether. This rejuvenated the feminists inside the VDB, both in parliament and in the local chapters. They were spurred on by the activities of the VVGS, whose youth committee's president Tendeloo and other feminists such as Willemijn Posthumus-van der Goot organised protests across the country. Bakker-Nort said Romme pretended to base his exclusion of married women from the workforce on principle grounds that the husband was the breadwinner and the wife had to look after the family, but illogically did not apply this principle when companies needed the women. The feminists' efforts did not go unrewarded: Romme never introduced his bill. In a later debate on labour issues, Bakker-Nort asked the government to address the widespread sexual harassment to which female factory workers were subjected. In 1939 her husband Gerrid died.

The late 1930s saw a rise in antisemitism in the Netherlands. The VDB attacked the NSB for condoning the Nazis' aggression toward German Jews during and following the Kristallnacht. They did, however, argue against the formal banning of the NSB, admitting that in a true democracy, even despicable voices should be allowed to be heard. Bakker-Nort said in 1938, "We can not allow democracy to be murdered by its adversaries." When in early 1940, fear of a German invasion increased, parliament debated a possible new law for treason. According to her, Bakker-Nort argued against the death penalty; traitors should be deported. In May 1940, just days before the German invasion of the Netherlands, Bakker-Nort announced she would not stand again in the 1941 election, leaving it to the next generation. Party members suggested Tendeloo would be a good candidate. Her last day in parliament was 9 May 1940, when she debated the bill for the punishment of treason and espionage. The next day Germany invaded the Netherlands. Within a week, the Dutch were defeated, and the German occupation began. The House and Senate no longer sat, and the occupiers dissolved parliament officially on 25 June 1940. Bakker-Nort had spent eighteen years in the House, addressing parliament mainly on the issues of justice, education, and labour, and for the majority of her stay, was on the Standing Committee for Private and Criminal Law.

== Imprisonment ==
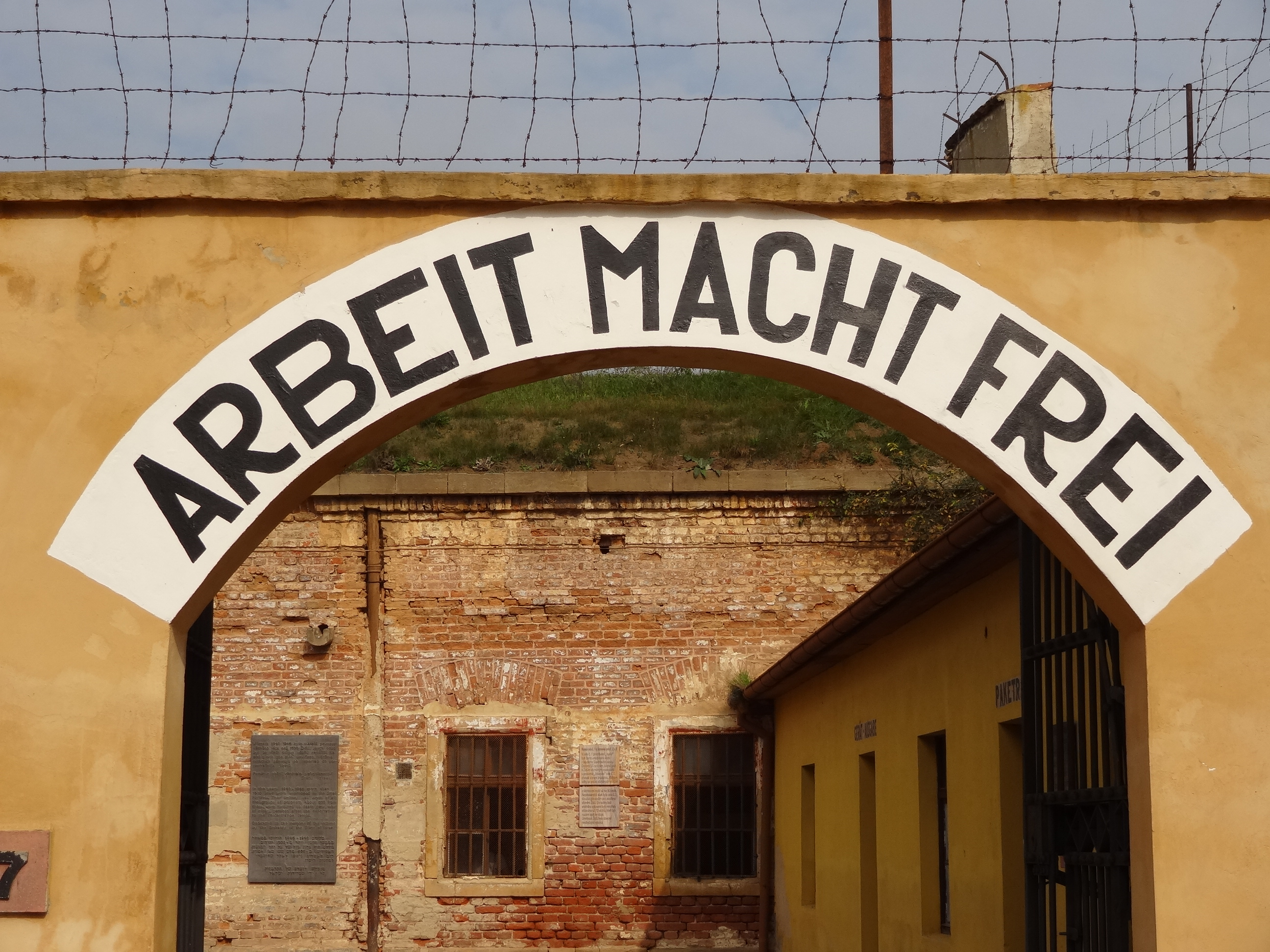
"Work is liberating" sign in the Theresienstadt concentration camp

As the German occupiers started to arrest and deport some Jewish Dutch citizens in the summer of 1940, Bakker-Nort must have felt threatened, according to Klijnsma. She had never belonged to a Jewish denomination and had renounced her Jewishness, but she did value Jewish traditions. In 1942, she was one of the few members of parliament who accepted an offer to resign and take their pension. However, this did not prevent her from being arrested by the Germans and imprisoned in the Westerbork transit camp in the northeast of the Netherlands in December 1942.

Following an intervention, possibly by VDB leader Dolf Joekes, Bakker-Nort was made part of Plan Frederiks and moved to Camp Barneveld in February 1943; Plan Frederiks was an agreement civil servant Karel Frederiks had made with the occupiers to keep a small group of Dutch Jews in the Netherlands and exclude them from deportation to the concentration camps. However, in April 1944, the Germans moved all Jews from Barneveld back to Westerbork and then in September 1944 onwards to the Theresienstadt concentration camp in Bohemia in what is now the Czech Republic. After the defeat of the Germans, Bakker-Nort was found alive at the camp in June 1945 by a Dutch repatriation mission, together with 400 other Dutch survivors. She moved to Utrecht and did not return to parliament. Her seat for the VDB was taken by Tendeloo.

== Death and legacy ==
Silent clip of Betsy Bakker-Nort in 1923

Bakker-Nort died in Utrecht on 23 May 1946, aged 72. While the national newspaper Algemeen Handelsblad published only a short notice of her death, Tendeloo and former VDB chairman Pieter Oud wrote obituaries. According to Oud, Bakker-Nort had successfully accomplished the task Jacobs had given her: of leading the women's movement. He praised her drive to get women the vote, without the militant aspects of the English suffragettes, and her tireless efforts to reform marital law and labour laws. He urged the country's young women to realise how much they owed to the pioneers of the women's movement, of whom Bakker-Nort was one of the most prominent. In his 1968 memoirs, Oud wrote that her dedication to public office was equal to none and that although he did not consider her oratory skills the best, she quickly became a competent parliamentarian through her high work rate. Her successor Tendeloo was instrumental in ending married women's incompetency to act.

Braun wrote in 2013 that in the 21st century, Bakker-Nort is seen as a transition figure who was part of the first wave of feminism in the Netherlands that got women the vote but continued the fight for more rights. Once women's suffrage was achieved, the strength of activism had significantly reduced: member numbers for groups such as the VVS dwindled. The newly acquired right to study at university quickly became standard, and the fight was almost forgotten. Despite the political climate in the 1920s and 1930s being dominated by Christian parties that aimed to reduce women's rights based on their interpretation of the Bible, Bakker-Nort's efforts, in and outside parliament, were relentless.

In 2003, many lost papers, notes, photos, pamphlets, and lectures that Bakker-Nort had kept resurfaced. At some point in the 1930s, she donated her documents to the International Archives for the Women's Movement in Amsterdam. The archives also housed personal documents of, among others, Jacobs and Rosa Manus and documents of women's organizations and journal issues. In July 1940, the Germans transported the entire archives to Germany. After the Soviet Red Army took Berlin in 1945, they moved all these stolen materials to Moscow. In 1992, the feminists' materials were identified in the Russian Military State Archives and recorded on microfilm, and ten years later returned to the International Archives of the Women's Movement. A lack of archives or access to them impacts how history is presented and whether women's stories can be uncovered. For example, the retrieval of the IAV records led to new biographies of Jacobs and Manus.

== Publications ==
- Bakker-Nort, Betsy (1910). "Waarop berust de maritale macht?" [On What Ground Is the Marital Power Based?]. Maandblad van de VVVK (in Dutch). 15 (2): 4.
- Bakker-Nort, Betsy (1915). Schets van de rechtspositie der getrouwde vrouw [Sketch Of The Legal Position Of Married Women] (in Dutch). the Hague: Belinfante.
- Bakker-Nort, Betsy (1917). Zijn vrouwen benoembaar tot notaris volgens de Nederlandsche wet? [Can Women Be Appointed Notary According To Dutch Law?] (in Dutch). Belinfante.
- Bakker-Nort, Betsy (1920). Hoofdlijnen voor een moderne huwelijkswetgeving [Main Points For a Modern Marriage Law] (Report) (in Dutch). VVS.
- Bakker-Nort, Betsy (1926). "De vrouwen tegen den Code Napoléon, naklanken van het congres te Parijs" [Women Against The Napoleonic Code, After Effects Of The Paris Convention]. Het Nieuwe Leven (in Dutch). 12 (4/5): 97–109.
- Bakker-Nort, Betsy (1930). "Een belangrijk wetsontwerp" [An Important Bill]. De opbouw, democratisch tijdschrift voor nederland en Indië (in Dutch): 276–286.
- Bakker-Nort, Betsy (1931). Moet de maritale macht in onze huwelijkswetgeving behouden blijven of worden afgeschaft? [Should Marital Power Be Kept Or Abolished In Our Marriage Law?] (in Dutch). pp. 1–16.
