= The Drunken Sailor and Other Kids Favourites =

Studio album by Tim Hart
- Released: 1983
- Length: 33:53
- Label: Music for Pleasure

The Drunken Sailor and other Kids Favorites is an album by Tim Hart and Friends.

This album follows Tim Hart's first collection "My Very Favorite Nursery Rhymes". There is a greater variety in treatment - "Hush Little Baby" is sung as a calypso, with the tune of "Island in the Sun" on oil-drums creeping in at the end. Melanie Harrold's "A Fox Jumped Up" has a bouncy hoedown fiddle, though there is no credit given for any fiddler. Brian Golbey does a comic-lugubrious version of "Clementine" with steel guitar accompaniment. (Brian had also been present on the first "Silly Sisters" album.) "What shall We Do With Drunken Sailor" is out-an-out disco a la Boney M. "Who Killed Cock Robin" has Maddy Prior double tracking in a very high pitched voice. Notable uilleann pipes player Davy Spillane plays, apprioriately, on the Irish song "Cockles and Mussels". Maddy does a duet with Melanie Harrold on "Michael Finnegal", to the sound of mandolas and mandolins (or perhaps they are synthesisers).

EMI released an hour-long cassette called "Favorite Nursery Rhymes" in 1985. It contained all these tracks except "Widdecombe Fair" and "Curly Locks". It also contained all but two tracks from "My Very Favorite Nursery Rhymes". In their place there was a new track - "Humpty Dumpty". In 1989 EMI/Music For Pleasure released a 3-CD set called "The Children's Collection". One CD consisted of a different selection of these tracks. The same two tracks were missing from "The Drunken Sailor", but all the tracks from "My Very Favorite Nursery Rhymes" were present. Running time about 35 minutes. These tracks have not been publicly available since 1989. Producer Tim Hart. Engineer Dave Bascombe, Jerry Boys. Recorded 1983

== Track listing ==
LP - side one

1. Over The Hills And Far Away (Trad)
2. A Fox Jumped Up (Trad)
3. Clementine (Trad)
4. Three Jolly Rogues Of Lynn (Trad)
5. Who Killed Cock Robin? (Trad)
6. Cockles and Mussels (Trad)
7. Hush Little Baby (Trad)

LP - side two

1. What Shall We Do With The Drunken Sailor? (Trad)
2. The Riddle Song (Child Ballad 1) (Trad)
3. Michael Finnigan (Trad)
4. Widecombe Fair (Trad)
5. Froggy's Courting (Trad)
6. Curly Locks (Trad)

== Good News ==
Park Records have re-released Tim Hart's Very Favorite Nursery Rhyme Record; a 2-CD album containing 32 tracks. I believe this was done to help pay for his cancer treatment, hopefully the money will now be used towards some sort of memorial for Tim.

== Track listing ==
CD1

1. Oh The Grand Old Duke Of York
2. Sing A Song Of Sixpence
3. Once I Caught A Fish Alive
4. Medley
5. Little Bo Peep
6. Mary, Mary Quite Contrary
7. Old MacDonald Had A Farm
8. There Was An Old Woman Tossed Up In A Basket
9. Twinkle, Twinkle Little Star
10. Boys And Girls Come Out To Play
11. Nick Nack Paddy Wack
12. Baa, Baa Black Sheep
13. Bobby Shaftoe
14. Hush-A-Bye-Baby
15. Humpty Dumpty
16. Lavenders Blue (Dilly Dilly)
17. London Bridge Is Falling Down
18. Oranges And Lemons
19. Oh Dear What Can The Matter Be

CD2

1. Over The Hills And Far Away
2. A Fox Jumped Up
3. Clementine
4. Three Jolly Rogues Of Lynn
5. Who Killed Cock Robin?
6. Cockles And Mussels
7. Hush Little Baby
8. What Shall We Do With The Drunken Sailor?
9. The Riddle Song
10. Michael Finnigan
11. Widdicombe Fair
12. Froggy's Courting
13. Curly Locks

== Personnel ==
- Maddy Prior - vocals
- Melanie Harrold - vocals
- Brian Golbey - vocals
- Gina Fullerlove - French horn
- B.J. Cole - steel guitar
- Rick Kemp - bass
- Spike Fullerlove - vocals
- Tamsey Kaner - cello
- Lea Nicholson - concertina
- Steve Noble - percussion
- Debbie Paul - vocals
- Andy Richards - synthesiser
- Beverly Jane Smith - vocals
- Davy Spillane - uilleann pipes
- The Livingston Hooray Ensemble - chorus
