= The Grey Cock =

Traditional song

The Grey Cock or Saw You My Father (Roud 179) is one of the famous English/Scots Child ballads (number 248) and is sometimes known as The Lover's Ghost.

It has been recorded by many singers, including Tim Hart and Maddy Prior (on Summer Solstice, 1971) and Eliza Carthy.

== Synopsis ==
A woman asks after her father, her mother, and her true-love John. Only John is there. He waits until all are abed and joins her. The woman tells the cock to crow when it is day; it crows an hour early, and she sends her love away before she needs to.

== Versions ==
Two versions are printed in James Reeves's The Everlasting Circle. They were collected at Beaminster and Puddletown in Dorset. "Child assumes the ballad to be an aubade, but in an article in the Journal of American Folklore (Vol. 67, No. 265, 1954) Dr Albert B. Friedman gives reasons for thinking that it concerns a revenant or lover's ghost, due to return to the world of the dead at cock-crow.—James Reeves. Popularly known and recorded as The Night Visiting Song, the piece implies that the lover's death was from drowning at sea: he died because of the "tempest's rages" and must return to the "arms of the deep".

== See also ==
- Willie's Fatal Visit
