= My Very Favourite Nursery Rhymes =

Studio album by Tim Hart and friends
- Released: 1981
- Genre: Children's

Tim Hart chronology
Tim Hart (1979)	My Very Favourite Nursery Rhymes (1981)	The Drunken Sailor and other Kids Songs (1983)

My Very Favourite Nursery Rhymes is an album by Tim Hart and Friends.

By 1981 both Tim Hart and Maddy Prior had children, so it was appropriate to create an album of children's songs. The treatment is very light and poppy. The clever use of synthesisers makes it seems as if there is a whole orchestra present at times. Tim takes the lead on most songs. "Old MacDonald" and "Bobby Shaftoe" are given country-and-western treatments. John Kirkpatrick takes the lead vocals on "Little Bo Peep". Melanie Harold leads on "Bobby Shaftoe". The album was released on the Music for Pleasure label. Another similar album was released in 1983, called "The Drunken Sailor". The rights for "Music for Pleasure" were sold to EMI Gold, who released an hour-long cassette called "Favourite Nursery Rhymes" in 1985. It contained all these tracks except "Old Woman Tossed Up in a Blanket" and "Boys and Girls come out to Play". Two tracks were missing from "The Drunken Sailor". In its place there was a new track – "Humpty Dumpty", with leads vocals by Bob Johnson. In 1989 EMI/Music For Pleasure released a 3-CD set called "The Children's Collection". One CD consisted of spoken fairy stories, one was Disney hits, and one was a different selection of tracks. This time all the tracks of this album were present, but two tracks were again missing from "The Drunken Sailor".

Despite the commercial appeal of these tracks they were not publicly available since from 1989 until Park Records re-issued the double CD. If you are a Registered DJ in the European Union, you may buy "Complete Kids Collection" which has 3 of the tracks. The website dms world also lists two tracks which are not otherwise available – "Wheels on the Bus" and "Hokey Cokey". Of course, this may be an error on the website, but if so, the mistake is repeated on the DJ-only album "DJs Guide to ... Kids Parties 2". Running time about 35 minutes. Producer Tim Hart. Engineer Dave Cook, Recorded at Quest Studios, at 71 Windmill Road, Luton 1981.

== LP track listing ==
=== Side one ===
1. The Grand Old Duke of York (Trad)
2. Sing a Song Of Sixpence (Trad)
3. Once I Caught A Fish Alive (Trad)
4. Medley: Hey Diddle Diddle/Little Jack Horner/Little Miss Muffet (Trad)
5. Little Bo Peep (Trad)
6. Mary Mary Quite Contrary (Trad)
7. Old MacDonald Had A Farm (Trad)
8. There Was an Old Woman Tossed Up In A Blanket (*) (Trad)
9. Twinkle Twinkle Little Star (Unknown)

=== Side two ===
1. Boys and Girls Come Out To Play (*) (Trad)
2. Nick Nack Paddy Wack (Trad)
3. Baa Baa Black Sheep (Trad)
4. Bobby Shaftoe (Trad)
5. Hush-a-Bye Baby (Trad)
6. Lavender's Blue (Dilly, Dilly) (Trad)
7. London Bridge Is Falling Down (Trad)
8. Oranges and Lemons (Trad)
9. Oh Dear, What Can The Matter Be (Trad)

== CD track listing ==
=== Disc 1 ===
1. Oh The Grand Old Duke Of York
2. Sing A Song Of Sixpence
3. Once I Caught A Fish Alive
4. Medley
5. Little Bo Peep
6. Mary, Mary Quite Contrary
7. Old Macdonald Had A Farm
8. There Was An Old Woman Tossed Up In A Basket
9. Twinkle, Twinkle Little Star
10. Boys And Girls Come Out To Play
11. Nick Nack Paddy Wack
12. Baa, Baa Black Sheep
13. Bobby Shaftoe
14. Hush-A-Bye-Baby
15. Humpty Dumpty
16. Lavenders Blue (Dilly Dilly)
17. London Bridge Is Falling Down
18. Oranges And Lemons
19. Oh Dear What Can The Matter Be

=== Disc 2 ===
1. Over The Hills And Far Away
2. A Fox Jumped Up
3. Clementine
4. Three Jolly Rogues Of Lynn
5. Who Killed Cock Robin?
6. Cockles And Mussels
7. Hush Little Baby
8. What Shall We Do With The Drunken Sailor?
9. The Riddle Song
10. Michael Finnigan
11. Widdicombe Fair
12. Froggy’s Courting
13. Curly Locks

== Charts ==
Chart (1983)	Peak position
Australian (Kent Music Report)	55

== Personnel ==
- Tim Hart – vocals, acoustic and electric guitar
- Maddy Prior – vocals
- John Kirkpatrick – vocals, concertina
- Melanie Harrold – vocals
- Bob Johnson – vocals, electric guitar
- Peter Knight – violin
- Rick Kemp – bass
- B.J. Cole – steel guitar
- Tamsey Kaner – cello
- Mickey Posner, Andy Richards – synthesisers
- William Spencer, Gary Wilson and the St. Michaels School – playground noise
