= Spier (surname) =

Spier is a surname. Notable people with the surname include:

- Bernd Spier (1944–2017), German schlager singer and record producer
- Guy Spier (born 1966), South African/German/lsraeIi Swiss-based investor and author
- Jo Spier (1900–1978), Dutch artist and illustrator
- Peter Spier (1927–2017), Dutch-born American illustrator and writer
- Virgil Spier (born 1981), Dutch athlete
- William Spier (1906–1973), American writer, producer, and director for television and radio
