= The Fox (folk song) =

Folk song

The Fox is a traditional folk song (Roud 131) from England. It is also the subject of at least two picture books, The Fox Went out on a Chilly Night: An Old Song, illustrated by Peter Spier and Fox Went out on a Chilly Night, by Wendy Watson. The earliest version of the song was a Middle English poem, dating from the 15th century, found in the British Museum.

== Modern lyrics ==
Typical lyrics are as follows:

The fox went out on a chilly night,
he prayed to the Moon to give him light;
he'd a many a mile to go that night
before he reached the town-o, town-o, town-o,
he'd many a mile to go that night
before he reached the town-o.

He ran till he came to a great big bin
where the ducks and the geese were put there in.
"A couple of you will grease my chin
before I leave this town-o, town-o, town-o,
a couple of you will grease my chin
before I leave this town-o."

He grabbed the grey goose by the neck,
threw the duck across his back;
he didn't mind their quack, quack, quack,
and their legs all a-dangling down-o, down-o, down-o,
he didn't mind their quack, quack, quack,
and their legs all a-dangling down-o.

The old grey woman jumped out of bed;
out of the window she cocked her head,
crying, "John, John! The grey goose is gone
and the fox is on the town-o, town-o, town-o!"
Crying, "John, John, the grey goose is gone
and the fox is on the town-o!"

So John, he ran to the top of the hill,
and he blew his horn both loud and shrill.
The fox, he said, "I'd better flee with my kill,
or they'll soon be on my trail-o, trail-o, trail-o!"
The fox, he said, "I'd better flee with my kill,
or they'll soon be on my trail-o!"

He ran till he came to his cozy den;
and there were his little ones eight, nine, ten.
They said, "Daddy, daddy, better go back again,
'cause it must be a mighty fine town-o, town-o, town-o!"
They said, "Daddy, daddy, better go back again,
'cause it must be a mighty fine town-o."

Then the fox and his wife without any strife
cut up the goose with a fork and knife.
They never had such a supper in their life
and the little ones chewed on the bones-o, bones-o, bones-o,
they never had such a supper in their life
and the little ones chewed on the bones-o.

== History ==
The two earliest versions both date from the fifteenth century (c. 1500), and are written in Middle English. The first, usually called "The Fox and the Goose", goes as follows:

"Pax uobis," (Note: Latin: Pax vobis, "Peace to you") quod the ffox,
"for I am comyn to toowne."

It fell ageyns the next nyght
the fox yede to with all his myghte,
with-outen cole or candelight,
whan that he cam vnto the toowne.

Whan he cam all in the yarde,
soore te geys wer ill a-ferde.
"I shall macke some of yow lerde,
or that I goo from the toowne!"

Whan he cam all in the croofte,
there he stalkyd wundirfull soofte;
"For here haue I be frayed full ofte
whan that I haue come to toowne."

He hente a goose all be the heye;
fast the goose began to creye;
oowte yede men as they myght heye
and seyde, "Fals fox, ley it doowne!"

"Nay," he saide, "soo mot I the—
sche shall go unto the wode with me,
sche and I vnther a tre,
e-mange the beryis browne.

I haue a wyf, and sche lyethe seke;
many smale whelppis sche haue to eke;
many bonys they must pike
will they ley adowne!"

The second, called "The False Fox" ("false" here meaning "deceitful"), is as follows:

The fals fox camme unto owre croft,
and so oure gese ful fast he sought;

With how, fox, how!
With hey, fox, hey!
Comme no more unto oure howse
to bere oure gese aweye!

The fals fox camme into oure yerde,
and there he made the gese aferde.

Refrain

The fals fox camme unto oure gate,
and toke our gese there where they sate.

Refrain

The fals fox camme to owre halle dore;
and shrove our gese there in the flore.

Refrain

The fals fox camme into our halle,
and assoyled our gese both grete and small.

Refrain

The fals fox camme unto oure cowpe,
and there he made our gese to stowpe.

Refrain

He toke a gose fast by the nek,
and the goose thoo begann to quek.

Refrain

The good wyfe camme out in her smok,
and at the fox she threw hir rok.

Refrain

The good mann camme out with his flayle,
and smote the fox upon the tayle.

Refrain

He threw a gose upon his bak,
and furth he went to thoo with his pak.

Refrain

The goodmann swore, yf that he myght,
he wolde hym slee or it were nyght.

Refrain

The fals fox went into his denne,
and there he was fully mery thenne.

Refrain

He camme ayene yet the next wek,
and toke awey both henne and chek.

Refrain

The goodman saide unto his wyfe,
"This fals fox lyveth a mery lyfe."

Refrain

The fals fox camme uppoun a day,
and with oure gese he made a ffray.

Refrain

He toke a goose fast by the nek,
and made her to say, "Wheccumquek!"

Refrain

"I pray the, fox," said the goose thoo,
"take of my fethers but not of my to."

Refrain

In Joseph Ritson's Gammer Gurton's Garland (1810), the song is recorded (under the name "Dame Widdle Waddle") thus: (The cover of 'The Fox' by Marty Robbins has the same lyrics as below.)

Old Mother Widdle Waddle jumpt out of bed,
And out at the casement she popt out her head:
Crying the house is on fire, the grey goose is dead,

And the fox he is come to the town, oh!

== Modern covers ==
"The Fox" has been recorded or covered by:

1950s

- J. R. R. Tolkien, singing Sam Gamgee's song of the Stone Troll to the melody of The Fox.
- Harry Belafonte, on Mark Twain and Other Folk Favorites RCA LPM-1022, LP (1954)
- Pete Seeger, on Birds, Beasts, Bugs and Little Fishes Folkways, LP (1955)
- Burl Ives, on Burl Ives Sings... For Fun (1956)
- Odetta, on Odetta at the Gate of Horn (1957)
- Gateway Singers, on Live at Stanford (1957)
- Salli Terri, on Songs of Enchantment (1959)

1960s

- The Brothers Four, on the album Rally 'Round! (c. 1960)
- Jimmie Rogers, from the album Jimmie Rogers Sings Folk Songs (1960)
- Tom Glazer, from the Album Come On and Join in the Game (1960s)
- Bob Grossman, from the Album Bob Grossman (1961) EKL 215 B
- The Smothers Brothers, on the comedy album Think Ethnic (1963)
- Jon Pertwee, on the album Children's Favourites (1966) MFP 1175
- The Young Tradition, as "Daddy Fox," on the album So Cheerfully Round (1967) TRA 155

1970s

- MacLean & MacLean, as a parody with vulgar lyrics on MacLean & MacLean Suck Their Way to the Top
- Estil C. Ball, on High Atmosphere: Ballads and Banjo Tunes from Virginia and North Carolina (1975)
- Roger Whittaker, on the album The Magical World of Roger Whittaker (1975)
- Tom Glazer, on the album Children's Greatest Hits, Vol II (1977)

1980s

- Tim Hart, as "A Fox Jumped Up" on the album The Drunken Sailor and other Kids Favourites (1983)
- Fred Penner, on Special Delivery, LP (1983), later reissued as Ebeneezer Sneezer, (1994), CD
- A cartoon made by Weston Woods Studios (1988)
- Benjamin Luxon and Bill Crofut, on the album Simple Gifts (1989)

1990s

- Peter, Paul and Mary, on the album Peter, Paul and Mommy, Too (1993)
- Bill Staines, on his album One More River (1998)
- Charlie Zahm, on his album The Celtic Balladeer (1999)

2000s

- Nickel Creek, on their eponymous album (2000)
- Da Vinci's Notebook, parodied as "The Gates" about a disgruntled laptop PC user going after Bill Gates on Brontosaurus (2002)
- Shira Kammen ("The False Fox", vocals by Shay Black) on The Almanac (2003)
- Eddie Blazonczyk and the Versatones, on Under the Influence (2005)
- Tom Chapin, sung/narrated as an audio book with Chapin providing all the voices (2006)

2010s

- Garrison Keillor and Guy's All Star Shoe Band, performed on a broadcast of A Prairie Home Companion (2011)
- Laura Veirs, on her album Tumble Bee (2011)
- We Banjo 3, released as a single with Sharon Shannon (2015)
- Misha Collins and Darius Marder, on a livestream (2016)
- Little Baby Bum "The Fox Song" (2016) and "The Fox and the Moon" (2019)
- Husband and wife folk duo The Hound+The Fox on the album Moon Songs: Lullabies for Baby and Parent (2017)
- Peter Hollens on his album Legendary Folk Songs (2018)
- The Petersens & Ger O'Donnell (2019)
