= Barneveld =

Barneveld refers to the following places:

== Netherlands ==
- Barneveld (municipality), municipality in Gelderland
- Barneveld (town), town in the municipality
- Camp Barneveld, World War II internment camp for Dutch Jews near the town of Barneveld

== United States ==
- Barneveld, New York
- Barneveld, Wisconsin

== See also ==
- Van Barneveld
