= Camp Barneveld =

Nazi camp for Jews in the occupied Netherlands

Barneveld
- Internment camp
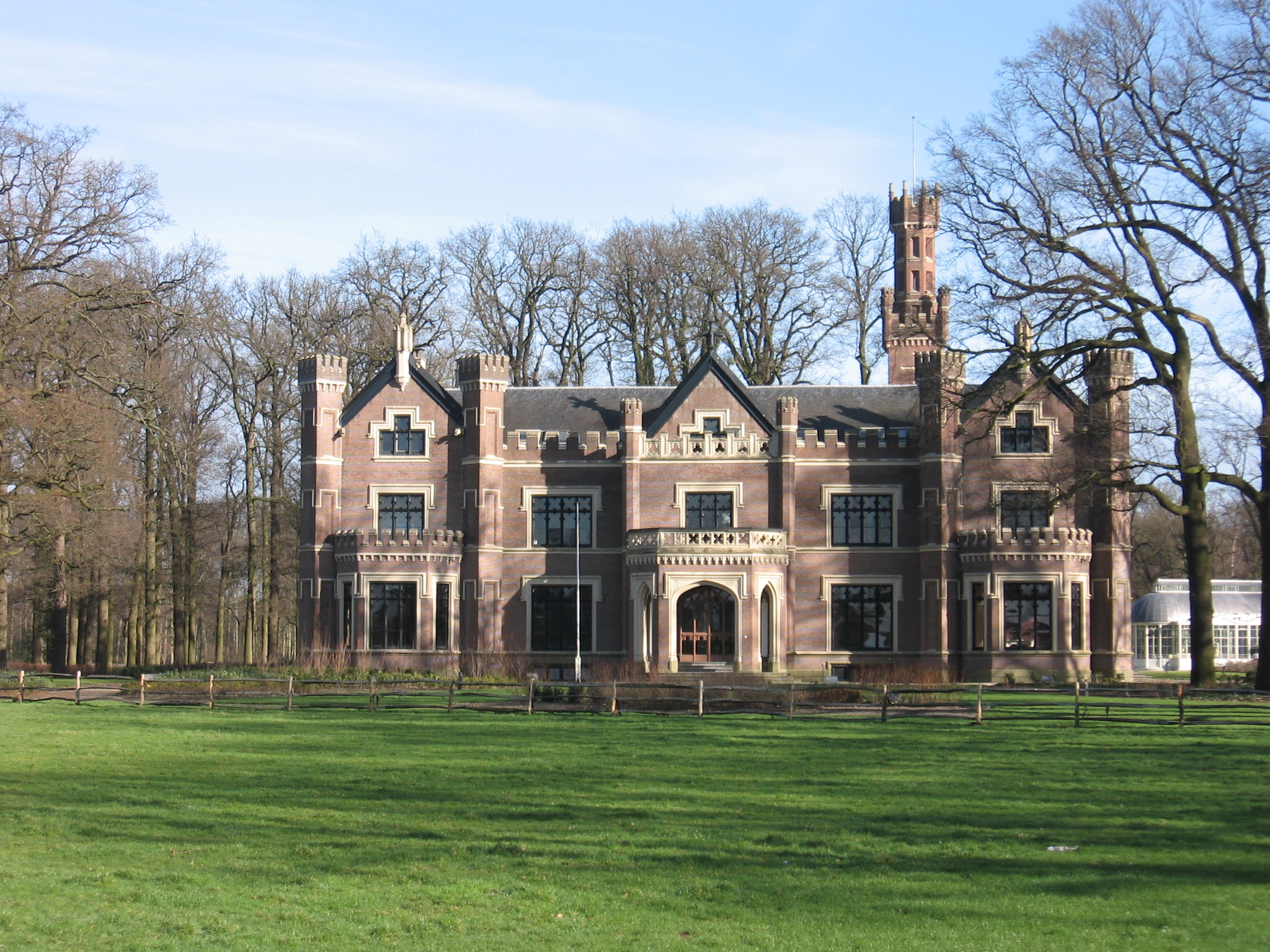
- Castle De Schaffelaar was one of two buildings of Camp Barneveld

- Location within Netherlands
- Coordinates: 52°8′N 5°35′E
- Location: Barneveld, the Netherlands
- Original use: Residence, job creation camp
- Operational: 16 December 1942 – 29 September 1943
- Inmates: Jews
- Number of inmates: around 650 deported to Westerbork transit camp and onwards to Theresienstadt; around 600 liberated
- Notable inmates: Abel Herzberg, Betsy Bakker-Nort, Eduard Meijers

Camp Barneveld was an internment camp consisting of two buildings for Dutch Jews near the town of Barneveld, the Netherlands during the German occupation in World War II. Dutch civil servant Karel Frederiks had made an arrangement, later called Plan Frederiks, with the occupiers to keep a small group of Dutch Jews in the Netherlands and exclude them from deportation to the labour, concentration, or extermination camps abroad. At first, in December 1942, a castle called De Schaffelaar was used to house the interned Jews. When De Schaffelaar was full, a nearby large villa called De Biezen and its barracks were added. Although the Nazis did eventually, in September 1943, deport the group of around 650 Jews from Camp Barneveld to Westerbork transit camp and then on to concentration camp Theresienstadt in Bohemia, almost all survived.

== Background ==
In mid-1942, Dutch civil servant Karel Fredriks had made an arrangement with the Generalkommissar Fritz Schmidt to safeguard five "deserving" Dutch Jews. Another civil servant, Jan van Dam, also approached Schmidt and within months the list was extended to a few hundred, selected from thousands of Jewish lawyers, professors, doctors, musicians and actors begging to be included. Reichskommissar Arthur Seyss-Inquart officially promised to keep those on the list from being deported to camps abroad. Dutch historian Jacques Presser wrote in his 1968 book about the Dutch Jews during the occupation that the Nazis possibly agreed to Plan Frederiks in order to channel any nascent resistance. Historian Loe de Jong called the Barneveld Jews "an easy prey for the occupier" in his 14 volume book series The Kingdom of the Netherlands During World War II. Frederiks arranged an empty castle near Barneveld, De Schaffelaar, to house the Jews. On 16 December 1942 the first Jews arrived.

== Camp ==
De Schaffelaar was a neo-gothic castle dating from the 1850s. It was in a derelict state, without heating and sanitary ware. It was surrounded by a large lawn and woods. There was no fence. There were no German guards. The first arrivals brought their own furniture, turning the many empty rooms into small living rooms. Barracks were placed in the gardens in around March 1943 to house the ever-expanding group.

Once the castle and its barracks were full, the barracks on the grounds of the nearby villa De Biezen were selected for the newcomers. In the 1930s, during and following the Great Depression, De Biezen had been a labour camp for jobless people.

Camp Barneveld was run by a Dutch officer, supported by six staff who performed administrative duties as well as acting as guards. They were paid from the camp fund raised from the interned Jews themselves; on arrival the Jews had to hand over all their money. Children were given daily lessons by professors. There were concerts and speeches. A woman who had been interned at Barneveld as a child later said she never realised she was imprisoned. Compared to life at Herzogenbusch concentration camp and Westerbork transit camp, other Nazi camps in the Netherlands, life at Camp Barneveld was favourable. Initially visitors were allowed and the interned Jews were allowed to visit the town. From June 1943 onwards these privileges were taken away.

From interviews with survivors Presser concluded that many Barneveld Jews had assessed the risks involved in going into hiding to be greater than voluntarily going to Camp Barneveld. One couple maintained contacts with outside the camp in order to be able to flee, which eventually they did. In May 1943 there were 538 people interned at the camp, 363 in De Schaffelaar and 175 in De Biezen. By early September this had grown to 651, 468 in the castle, 183 in the villa. Prominent names among them were writer Abel Herzberg, member of the House of Representatives Betsy Bakker-Nort, and jurist Eduard Meijers.

== Closure ==
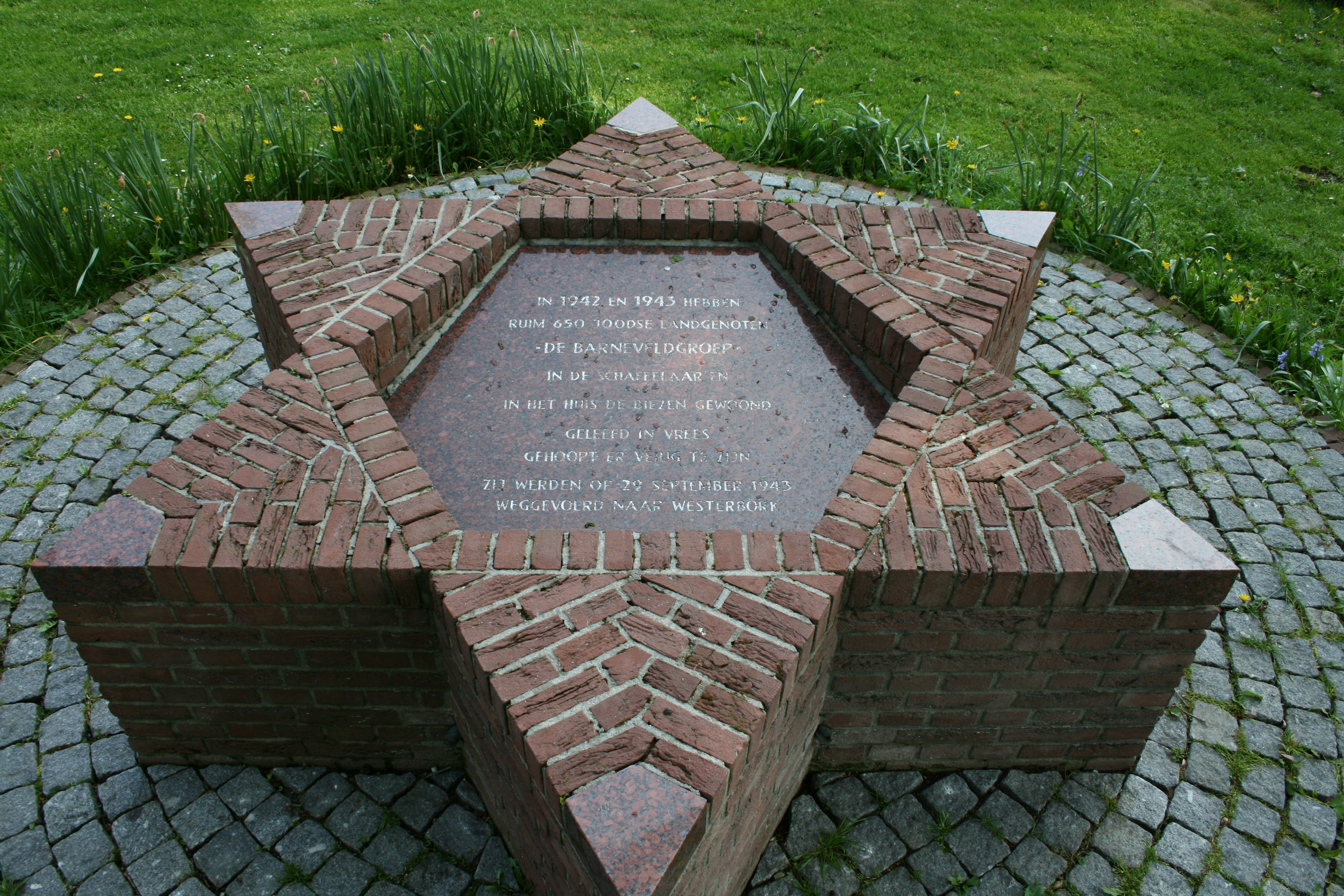
Jewish monument at Camp Barneveld

Schmidt died in June 1943. In August 1943 orders were sent from Berlin to close the camp and deport the Jews. On 29 September 1943 the Barneveld Jews were told they were going to be transferred to Westerbork. An eyewitness reported the Nazis did not carefully guard the prisoners and 22 people fled. On 4 September 1944 the group was put on a train to concentration camp Theresienstadt in Bohemia; a list from Westerbork exists with 650 names of which 16 are crossed out.

== See also ==
- The Saved
