= Mien van Itallie-Van Embden =

Dutch politician

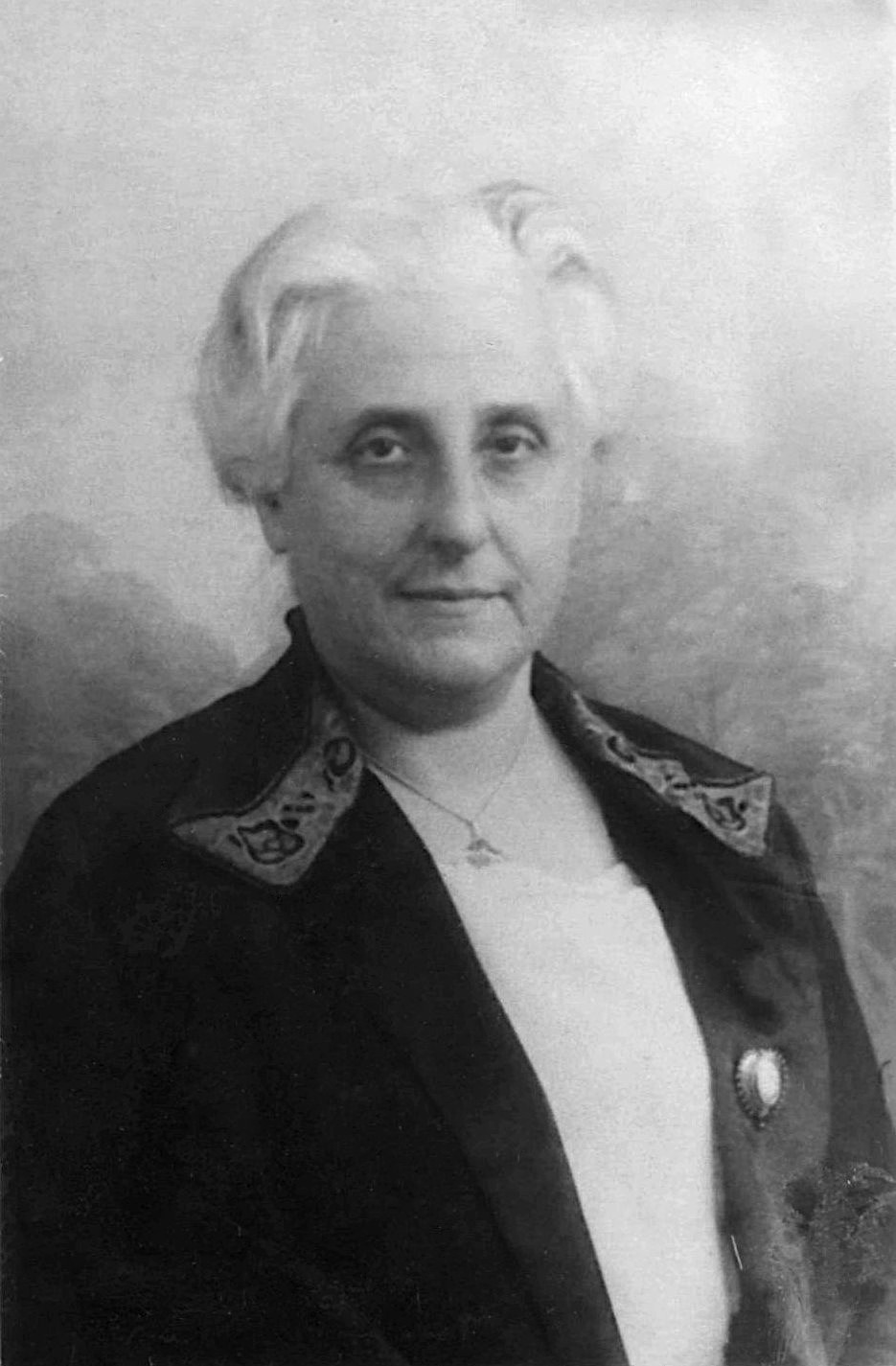
- van Itallie-van Embden in the 1930s

Member of the House of Representatives
- In office 1928–1933

Personal details
- Born: Hendrika Wilhelmina Bernardina van Itallie-van Embden; 22 October 1870 the Hague, the Netherlands
- Died: 6 September 1959 (aged 88) Trogen, Switzerland
- Party: VDB

Hendrika Wilhelmina Bernardina "Mien" van Itallie-van Embden (22 October 1870 – 6 September 1959) was a Dutch lawyer and politician who served as a member of the House of Representatives from 1928 until 1933 for the Free-thinking Democratic League (VDB).

She was active in the women's rights and peace movements. From a young age she was a member of the Vereeniging voor Vrouwenkiesrecht, of which she became a leading figure in 1900. She married Leopold van Itallie in 1894, after which she was known as Mien van Itallie-van Embden. By 1911, she was on the board of the VDB, one of two female board members, Betsy Bakker-Nort being the other. In 1915 she was elected on the board of the Women's International League for Peace and Freedom.

On 18 September 1928 she became a member of the House of Representatives for the VDB, taking the seat of Simon van Aalten who had died, and joining Bakker-Nort as the party's second female member of parliament. She maintained her seat after the 1929 general election. She often argued the case for dewaponisation and improvements for women.

Prior to the 1933 general election she decided not to put herself up on the VDB's candidate list. She was disillusioned with parliament's endless finance discussions following the Great Depression, hindering the ability to achieve the reforms she envisioned. She said an agricultural expert should take her place.

During the Second World War she and her husband were imprisoned by the Nazis in concentration camps in Barneveld, Westerbork, and Theresienstadt.
