= The Fox Went out on a Chilly Night: An Old Song =

1961 book by Peter Spier

- Author: Peter Spier
- Publisher: Doubleday
- Publication date: 1961
- Publication place: United States
- Pages: unpaged
- Awards: Caldecott Honor

The Fox Went out on a Chilly Night: An Old Song is a 1961 American children's picture book written and illustrated by Peter Spier. The book is an illustrated version of the song The Fox. The book was a recipient of a 1962 Caldecott Honor for its illustrations. A film by Weston Woods was made in 2007, sung by Alice Peacock.
