= Willie's Fatal Visit =

Traditional song

Song
- Genre: Scottish folk

Willie's Fatal Visit (Roud 244, Child 255) is an English-language folk song, most likely originating in Scotland.

== Synopsis ==
A woman asks after her mother, her father, her brother John, and her true love Willie. Only Willie was nearby. He came to her at night, and she took him to bed, telling the cock not to crow until daylight. It crows earlier, and she takes the moonlight for dawn. Willie goes. He meets a ghost along the way. By a church, she tells him that he traveled in sin and said no prayers; then she kills him, tearing his body asunder.

== Origins ==
A version of this ballad was published in Peter Buchan's Ancient Ballads and Songs of the North of Scotland. Francis James Child believed that the first part of the ballad was a medley of Sweet William's Ghost (Child ballad 77), Clerk Saunders (Child ballad 69) and The Grey Cock (Child ballad 248).

== See also ==
- List of the Child Ballads
