= Burl Ives Sings... For Fun =

Studio album Album Set by Burl Ives
- Released: 1956
- Genre: Folk
- Length: 30:54
- Label: Decca

Burl Ives chronology
Burl Ives Sings In the Quiet of the Night (1956)	Burl Ives Sings... For Fun (1956)	Children's Favorites (1956)

Burl Ives Sings... For Fun is a 1956 album by American folk singer Burl Ives.

== Reception ==
Professional ratings
Review scores
Source	Rating
Allmusic	3.5/5 stars

In his Allmusic review, critic Bruce Eder wrote of the album: "The mood is lighthearted, but it's not all wafting innocuous melodies, as "Goober Peas" calls up some serious echoes."

== Track listing ==
Side	Track	Song title	Length
1.	1.	The Fox	2:08
1.	2.	The Three Jolly Huntsmen	2:52
1.	3.	The Erie Canal	1:37
1.	4.	My Good Old Man	3:11
1.	5.	Old Dan Tucker	1:14
1.	6.	Wooly Boogie Bee	1:42
1.	7.	Blue Tail Fly	2:02
2.	1.	The Boll Weevil	1:35
2.	2.	Let's Go Hunting	2:28
2.	3.	Goober Peas	2:29
2.	4.	Aunt Rhody	1:13
2.	5.	Killigrew's Soiree	3:14
2.	6.	Big Rock Candy Mountain	2:39
2.	7.	I'm Goin' Down the Road (with The Andrews Sisters and Vic Schoen's Orchestra)	2:32
