= Villa Bouchina =

Dutch church that housed Jews in 1943

Coordinates: 51°58′11″N 6°17′20″E

Villa Bouchina was the parsonage of the Christian Reformed Church in the City of Doetinchem, Province of Gelderland. From February 27 until April 21, 1943, it was used temporarily to house nine Jews, including three children, who were known as Mussert Jews.

== History ==
Anton Mussert was the head of the Dutch Nazi Party, the NSB. A number of Jews had joined the NSB, which initially was not antisemitic. Once war broke out that changed, and all Jews were removed from NSB ranks. Villa Bouchina, the parsonage, had become temporarily empty when Rev. J.TH. Meesters was taken to camp Amersfoort on 11 September 1942 for his participation in the Dutch resistance, where he was executed on 15 October 1942. They had a cleaning lady as well as a cook. There were no guards. Despite them having been removed from the NSB, their original membership marked them as traitors. On April 21, these Jews were taken to Camp Theresienstad. They lived in Villa Bouchina not because they were of particular interest to the Dutch non-existing government or the Germans, but because they were under the direct protection of Anton Mussert. Mussert was executed by the Allied forces in 1946.

The reservation camp was part of Plan Frederiks. The idea was to protect certain Jews who had been and would be beneficial to the Netherlands. It is not confirmed whether Villa Bouchina was part of that plan. The designation of "a camp" is false.

In addition, in Barneveld (a couple of miles away from Doetinchem) the Germans used the castle 'De Schaffelaar' and the house 'De Biezen' for the same purpose. The approximately 600 inmates of Barneveld were chosen by Secretary-General Frederiks, who was also in control of Villa Bouchina. Fredericks was functioning within the confines of Nazi occupation under the Nazi leadership of Arthur Seyss-Inquart. The villa belonged to the Christian Reformed Church in Doetinchem.

== Prisoners ==
- Jo Spier
- Peter Spier
- Albertina Sophie (Tineke) Spier
- Céline Spier
- Thomas Spier
- Clara Ricardo-Ancona
- Abraham Spetter
- Paul Drukker
- Kaatje van Lunenburg-Groen

The prisoners stayed at Villa Bouchina until 21 April 1943 when they were deported via Westerbork to the Theresienstadt concentration camp. Paul Drucker was taken to Auschwitz on 9 March 1944 and died there. Abraham Spetter and Clara Ricardo-Ancona were removed on 28 February 1945 to a location in Central Europe.

The Spier family and Kaatje van Lunenburg-Groen survived the war.

== Research ==
A Dutch researcher has been investigating Villa Bouchina for a long time. Historian Chris van der Heijden in his book 'Joodse NSB'ers' also describes the history of Villa Bouchina.

There is no history on Villa Bouchina, except that for seven weeks eight or nine Jewish people temporarily lived there until late April 1943. From 1943 until 1946 Rev. C.H. Appelo lived at Villa Bouchina and from 1946 until 1952 Rev. E.J. Wassink.

Eventually a new Christian Reformed Church was built on de Holter Weg with a new parsonage. Villa Bouchina was sold to Dr. van Aken. Chris van der Heijden analyzes the war as well as the people who for seven weeks resided in the Parsonage.
