= Nancy Zeelenberg =

Dutch lawyer and politician

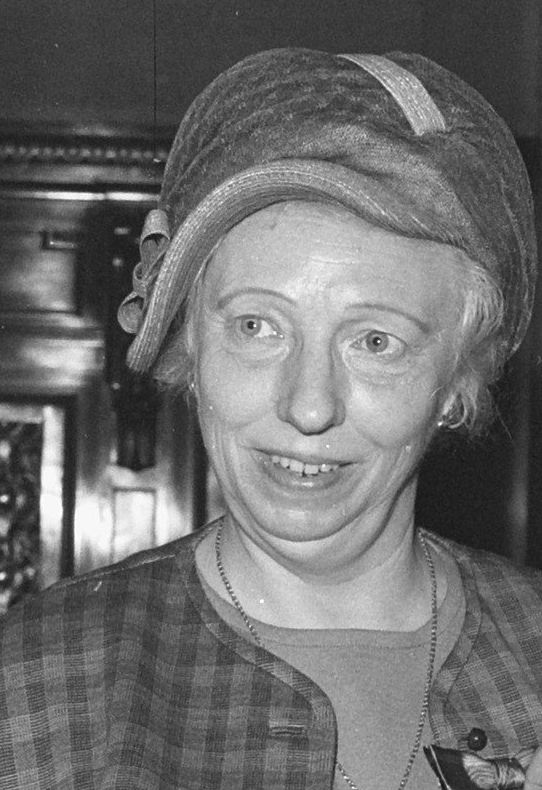

Member of the Council of State
- In office 1967–1978

Deputy Mayor of Rotterdam
- In office 1962–1967

Member of the municipal executive of Rotterdam
- In office 1958–1967

Member of the Senate of the Netherlands
- In office 1960–1967

Member of the House of Representatives of the Netherlands
- In office 1952–1958

Personal details
- Born: July 26, 1903
- Died: April 22, 1986 (aged 82)
- Party: Labour Party
- Occupation: Lawyer

Jannetje (Nancy) Zeelenberg (Rotterdam, July 26, 1903 – Rotterdam, April 22, 1986) was a Dutch lawyer and politician.

She was active in the field of women's emancipation and was chairman of the Onderlinge Vrouwenbescherming, Rotterdam Department, president of the Association for Women's Interest and Equal Citizenship (1946–1950), and member of the Committee of Inquiry into married civil servants working in the National Office.
