= Summer Solstice (album) =

Studio album by Maddy Prior and Tim Hart
- Released: 1971
- Genre: Folk
- Length: 31:39
- Label: B & C Records: Crest 12; Shanachie Records
- Producer: Sandy Roberton

Summer Solstice is a 1971 album by Maddy Prior and Tim Hart. The album was recorded after the duo had joined Steeleye Span. The songs are mostly pastoral, with subtle understated instrumental accompaniment. It differs from the duo's previous two Folk Songs Of Old England albums in its use of multitracking techniques (both on vocals and instruments), as well as additional flourishes of electric instruments on three tracks. The 1991 CD was issued on the Shanachie label.

== Track listing ==
All tracks (except 8 and 10) traditional, arranged by Hart and Prior.

1. False Knight on the Road (3:03)
2. Bring Us in Good Ale (3:51)
3. Of All the Birds (0:53)
4. I Live not Where I Love (4:25)
5. The Ploughboy and the Cockney (3:40)
6. Westron Wynde (0:27)
7. Sorry the Day I Was Married (1:29)
8. Dancing at Whitsun (3:40) (by Austin John Marshall, Copper Family)
9. Fly up My Cock (1:45)
10. Cannily Cannily (2:25) (by Ewan MacColl)
11. Adam Catched Eve (0:25)
12. Three Drunken Maidens (2:14)
13. Serving Girls Holiday (3:41)

== Personnel ==
=== Musicians ===
- Maddy Prior – vocals
- Tim Hart – vocals, acoustic guitar (1,4,5,8,12), electric guitar (5), acoustic appalachian dulcimer (2,10,13), electric appalachian dulcimer (13), harmonium (2,5), psaltery (2), tabor (13)
- Andy Irvine – mandolin (10)
- John Ryan – string bass (10,12)
- Gerry Conway – percussion (1), bells (2)
- Pat Donaldson – electric bass (1,5)
- Robert Kirby – string arrangement (4)

=== Production ===
- Producer: Sandy Roberton
- Engineers: Jerry Boys, Roger Mayer, Vic Gamm
- Art Direction, illustration: Grahame Berney, Keith Davis
- Photography: Keith Morris

== External sources ==
- Tim Hart And Maddy Prior - Summer Solstice at discogs.com
