= Three Jolly Rogues =

Traditional song

Song
- Genre: British folk

Three Jolly Rogues is an English folk song.

== Synopsis ==
A miller, a weaver and a tailor lived in King Arthur's time (or in "Good Old Colonial times"). They were thrown out because they could not sing. All three were thieves. They are suitably punished.

The Miller got drowned in a dam
The Weaver got hung in his yarn
The Tailor tripped as he ran away with the broadcloth under his arm.

== Lyrics (version from "Three Jolly Rogues of Lynn", performed by Tim Hart and Friends) ==
In good King Arthur's day
When we served under the King
Lived a miller and a weaver and a little tailor
Three jolly rogues of Lynn.

Now the miller he stole corn
And the weaver he stole yarn
And the little tailor he stole broadcloth
For to keep those three rogues warm

Now the miller was drowned in his dam
And the weaver was hanged in his yarn
And the devil put his claw on the little tailor
With the broadcloth under his arm

Now the miller still drowns in his dam
And the weaver still hangs in his yarn
And the little tailor he skips through hell
With the broadcloth under his arm

== Printed versions ==
The earliest complete text is a broadside in the Bodleian Library, dated 1804, "The Miller Weaver and Little Tailor". It is also known as "In Good King Arthur's Days". The song is quoted by Thomas Hardy in "Under the Greenwood Tree". It is known in the USA from the early nineteenth century, usually as "In Good Old Colony Days" or "In Good Old Colony Times."

== Recorded versions ==
Phonograph recording of Bismarck's voice (1889)
The only known recording of Bismarck's voice. See the file's page for a transcript and other details.

- Otto von Bismarck (1889) In good old colony times...
- Richard Dyer-Bennet on "Richard Dyer-Bennet 6 - With Young People in Mind" (1958)
- Oscar Brand on "Songs Inane Only" (1958)
- The Highwaymen (folk band) on "Standing Room Only!" (1961)
- Ed McCurdy on "The Folk Box" (various artists) (1964)
- Alice Stuart on "All The Good Times" (1964)
- The Watersons on "New Voices" (various artists) (1965)
- The Clancy Brothers on "Freedom's Sons" (1966); here, the song is titled “When We Were Under the King”
- Roger Nicholson on "Nonesuch for Dulcimer" (1972) (performed by Nicholson (mountain dulcimer) and Bob Johnson (guitar/vocals); here, the song is titled "In Good King Arthur's Day")
- Tim Hart on "The Drunken Sailor and other Kids Favourites" (1983)
- Tom Paxton on "A Folksong Festival" (Pax Records, 1986)
- Jim Douglas on "A Peddlar's Pack ", ℗ 2004 Smithsonian Folkways Recordings / 1979 Folkways Records, Released on: 1979-01-01
