= Standing committee (parliamentary system) =

Permanent legislative panel

A standing committee is a permanent committee made up of a small number of parliamentary members appointed to analyse and opine on issues in a specific area of government, such as, for example, finance, justice, or education. Its counterpart is a select committee, which is erected to investigate or solve a specific problem, and, upon conclusion, is dissolved.

Standing committees exist in the British Parliament, as well as in other parliaments based on the Westminster model or those borrowing from it, such as the US, Canada, and India.
