= Plan Frederiks =

Plan-Frederiks was a plan made up by the Dutch politicians K.J. Frederiks and J. van Dam that was meant to protect Jewish people in name of the German people during World War II.

The occupying German forces did not want the Jews to hide away, so they gave certain Jews places in special reservation camps in the Netherlands. Only Jews that had been important to Germany, for such reasons as fighting in World War I or being a famous painter, in case of Jo Spier, were given such treatment. Frederiks and Van Dam wanted other Jews to show up for this plan and try to get a place in one of these camps, instead of hiding away. It would be easy to catch these people.

The reservation camps that were used for this plan were Villa Bouchina, De Schaffelaar, and De Biezen. They were all opened in February 1943 and closed in April of the same year. In all, about 700 people were incarcerated in these camps, after which they were transported to Theresienstadt, where many of them died.
