= Jo Spier =

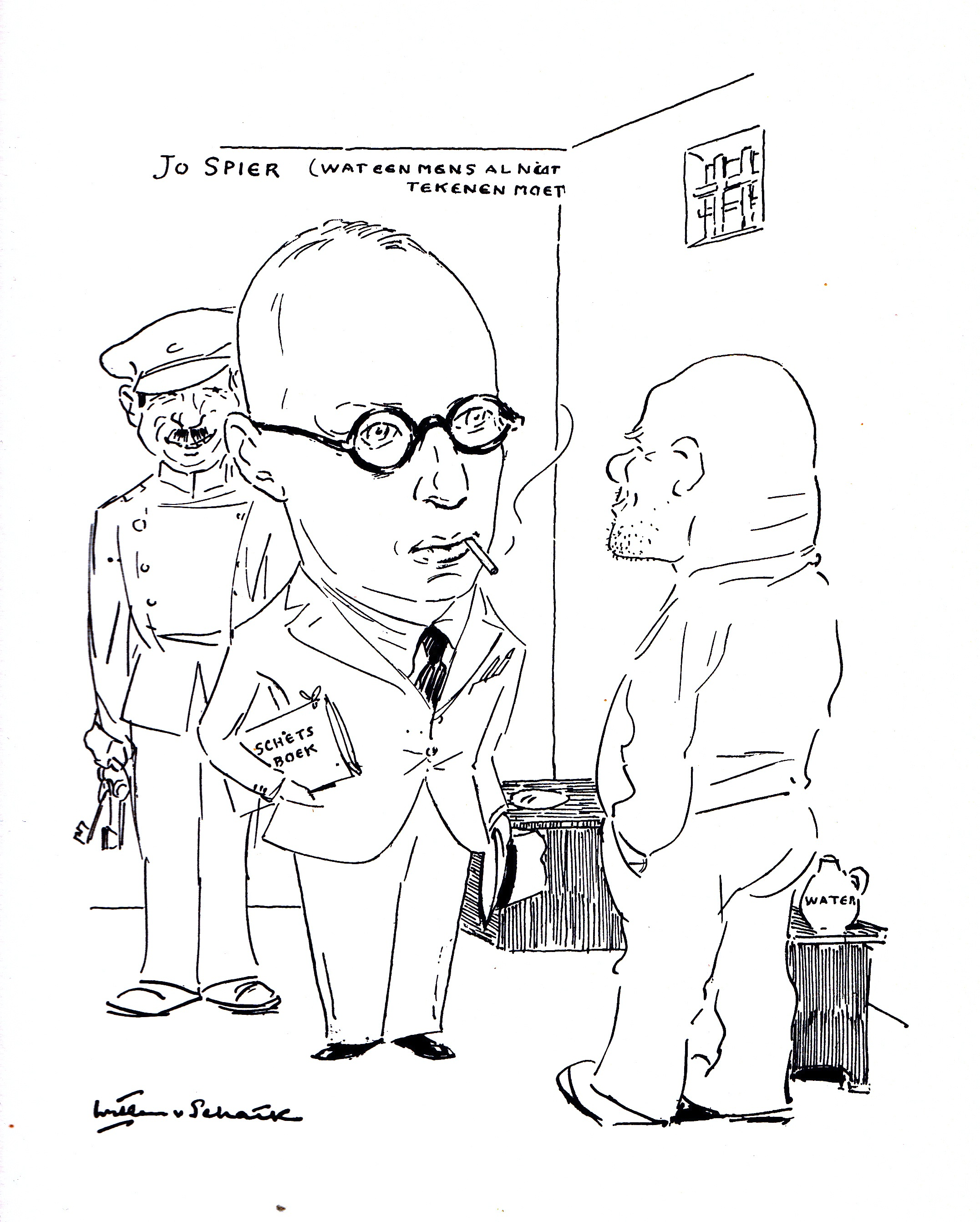
- Jo Spier (caricature by Willem van Schaik)
- Born: Joseph Eduard Adolf Spier; 26 June 1900; Zutphen
- Died: 21 May 1978 (aged 77); Santa Fe, New Mexico

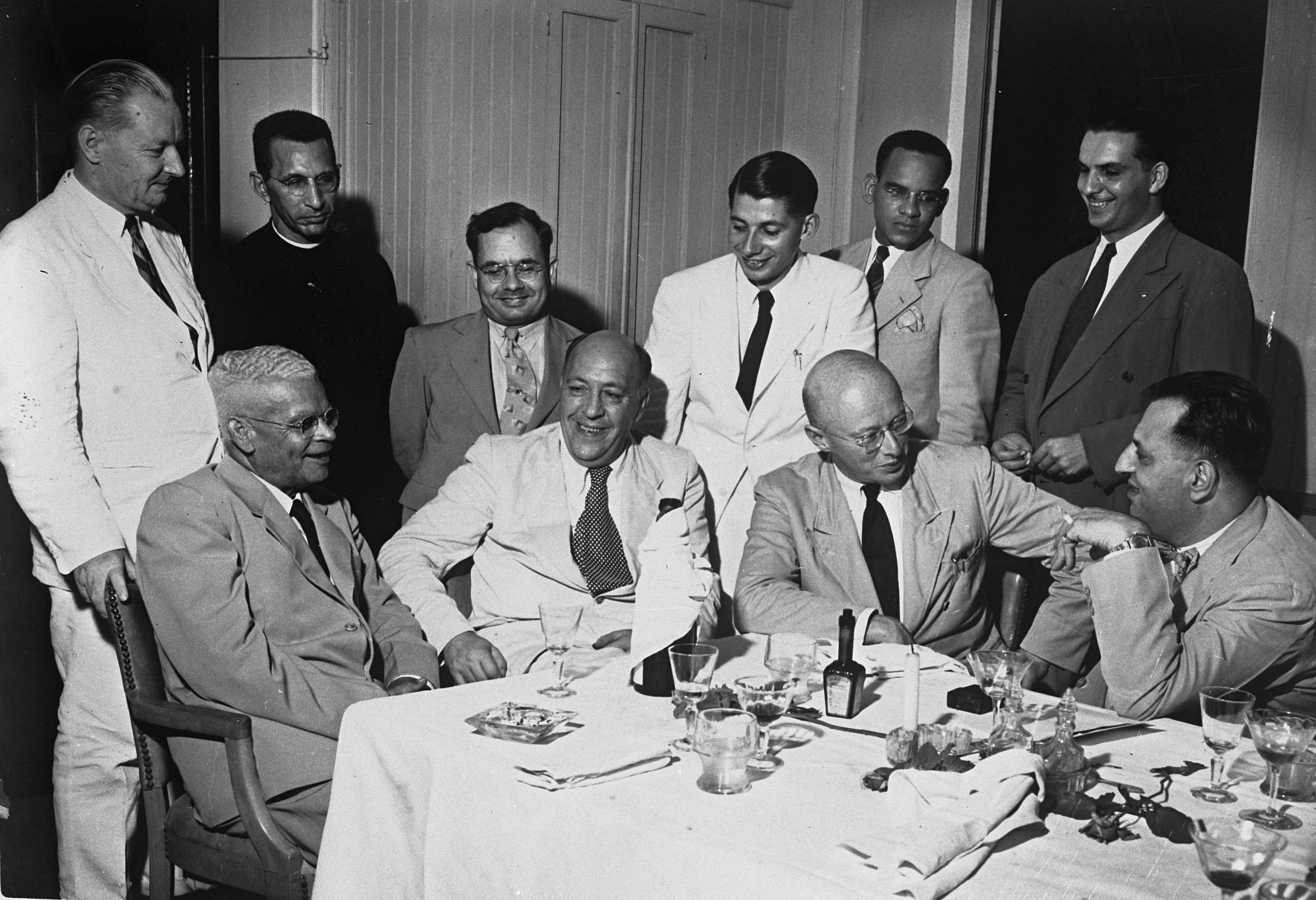
Jo Spier (sitting, 3rd from left) in 1947

Joseph Eduard Adolf Spier (26 June 1900 – 21 May 1978) was a popular Dutch artist and illustrator.

== Life ==
Jo Spier was born in Zutphen, the Netherlands. From 1924 to 1939 Jo Spier worked for the newspaper De Telegraaf where he created humorous illustrations and cartoons about everyday life. He also worked as a courtroom sketch artist and theater review artist for them. During World War II his subject matter became more political and he was arrested for his satirical depiction of Hitler. He was first sent to the camp at Westerbork, then to Villa Bouchina with his wife and three children. For a period of a few months in 1943 they were protected from transport to German concentration camps, supposedly due to the influence of the leader of the pro-German Nationaal Socialistische Beweging, Anton Mussert. On 21 April 1943 Spier was transferred to the Theresienstadt concentration camp, where he was held with his family until the end of the war. During his internment in Theresienstadt, Spier also cooperated with the Germans by assisting with the film Theresienstadt, ein Dokumentarfilm aus dem jüdischen Siedlungsgebiet.

== Emigration and death ==
Jo Spier moved to the United States in 1951 with his family and continued to work until the end of his life. Spier died in Santa Fe, New Mexico on 21 May 1978.

== Family ==
Jo Spier was married to Albertine Sophie "Tineke" van Raalte and they had three children, Peter Spier, Thomas Spier (DDS), and Celine Spier. Peter Spier was also a noted illustrator of children's books.

== Books illustrated by Jo Spier ==
- The Creation, text from Genesis, hand-lettered by Joseph P Ascherl, New York: Doubleday & Company, 1970.
- The Squirrel and the Harp, by David DeJong, New York: Macmillan, 1966.
- The Spice Cookbook, by Avanelle Day and Lillie Stuckey, David White Company, 1964
- Waters of the New World: Houston to Nantucket, by Jan de Hartog, New York: Atheneum, 1961.
- Peter Stuyvesant of Old New York, by Anna Crouse and Russel Crouse, New York: Random House, 1954.
- The Story of Louis Pasteur, by Alida Sims Malkus, New York: Grosset & Dunlap, 1952.
- One Sky to Share: The French and American Journals of Raymond Leopold Bruckberger, New York: P. J. Kenedy & Sons, 1952.
- Holland's House: a Nation Building a Home, by Peter Bricklayer, Haarlem, Netherlands: Joh. Enschede En Zonen, 1939.
- Mijn Jordanertjes : kinderen, die ik gekend heb, by A van Vlaardingen, Utrecht: Bijleveld, 1931.
- (in Dutch) Godfried Bomans: Kopstukken. Ill. Jo Spier. Amsterdam, Brussel, Elsevier 1947 etc. (27th pr., 1987)

== Bibliography ==
- Dat alles heeft mijn oog gezien. Herinneringen aan het concentratiekamp Theresienstadt 1942–1945. Amsterdam, Elsevier, 1978. ISBN 90-10-01965-9
- The Marshall Plan and You. The Hague, Netherlands, Ministry of Economic Affairs, 1949

=== About Jo Spier ===
- Peter van Straaten & Jo Spier. Virtuoze tekenaars van het Nederlandse leven. Persmuseum Amsterdam, 2012. No ISBN
- Jo Spier. Tekenaar van een tijdperk Samenst. door G.E. van Baarsel. Stedelijk Museum Zutphen, 2000. ISBN 90-805756-1-5
- Jo Spier: Album. Amsterdam, Elsevier, 1957. No ISBN
- Michel van der Plas: Vader en moeder. Baarn, Bosch& Keuning, 1987. ISBN 90-246-4621-9 (Interviews with children of famous parents, a.o. Peter Spier)
