= Peter Spier =

Dutch-American writer and illustrator

- Born: June 6, 1927; Amsterdam, North Holland
- Died: April 27, 2017 (aged 89); Port Jefferson, New York
- Education: Rijksakademie in Amsterdam
- Occupations: children's writer and illustrator
- Writing career
- Language: English
- Notable works: Island City: Adventures In Old New York (1961); The Fox Went Out on a Chilly Night (1961); London Bridge Is Falling Down! (1967), in the Mother Goose Library Series; To Market! To Market! (1967)
- Notable awards: Noah's Ark won: Caldecott Medal from the American Library Association; 1982 National Book Award in the Picture Book category; 1978 Lewis Carroll Shelf Award

Peter Spier (June 6, 1927 – April 27, 2017) was a Dutch-American illustrator and writer who created more than thirty children's books.

== Bio ==
Spier was born in Amsterdam, North Holland, and grew up in Broek in Waterland, the son of Jo Spier, a popular artist and illustrator, and Tineke van Raalte. Jo Spier was Jewish, and, during the Second World War, Peter and his father were two of nine prisoners of Villa Bouchina and were later imprisoned in Theresienstadt. After the war he studied at the Rijksakademie in Amsterdam and joined the Royal Netherlands Navy for four years. The entire Spier family emigrated to the United States in 1950. Spier started his career as a commercial artist for advertising agencies and only later focused on writing and illustrating children's books. He died on April 27, 2017, in Port Jefferson, New York.

== Medium and artistic style ==
Like other children's illustrators such as Beatrix Potter or Christopher Wormell, Peter Spier demonstrates his talent and skills as an artist/illustrator using pen, ink and watercolour on paper. Many of Spier's illustrations are extremely detailed and historically accurate. Close examination will often yield a humorous scene not readily apparent at first glance the finding of which often delights readers of all ages.

== Copyrights ==
Spier reserved all rights and retained the copyrights to his works. In correspondence he noted that many of the original publishing plates used to reproduce his work were not available though the original works were thought to survive.

== Publishers ==
The Doubleday & Company, Inc., of Garden City, New York, originally published many of Spier's works including The Mother Goose Library Series: "London Bridge Is Falling Down!". More recent publications can be found under the labels Doubleday Books For Young Readers, Dragonfly Books and Random House.

== Awards ==
Noah's Ark (1977) won the annual Caldecott Medal from the American Library Association, recognizing the illustrator of the year's "most distinguished American picture book for children". In its first paperback edition, it won a 1982 National Book Award in category Picture Books. (Note: Spier won the 1982 award for paperback Picture Books. From 1980 to 1983 in National Book Award history there were dual awards for hardcover and paperback books in many categories. Most of the paperback award-winners were reprints, including Noah's Ark. Also during that period alone, there were multiple Children's categories, including Picture Books in 1982 and 1983.) The book was named to the Lewis Carroll Shelf Award list in 1978.

People (1980) won a Christopher Award and was one of five finalists for the 1981 National Book Award in category Children's Nonfiction. (Note: From 1980 to 1983 there were multiple Children's categories, including Nonfiction from 1981 to 1983. Very few nonfiction books have won the undifferentiated NBA for Children's or Young People's Literature (1969–79 and 1996–present).) It was also adapted into a 1995 animated television special that soon aired on Disney Channel.

The Fox Went Out on a Chilly Night (1961) was named a Caldecott Honor Book by the American Library Association in 1962.

== Works ==
- Island City: Adventures In Old New York (1961)
- The Fox Went out on a Chilly Night: An Old Song (1961)
- London Bridge Is Falling Down! (1967), in the Mother Goose Library Series
- To Market! To Market! (1967)
- Hurrah, We're Outward Bound! (1968)
- And So My Garden Grows (1969)
- Of Dikes and Windmills (1969)
- The Erie Canal (1970)
- Gobble, Growl, Grunt (1971)
- Fast-Slow High-Low (1972)
- Crash! Bang! Boom! (1972)
- Tin Lizzie (1975)
- Noah's Ark (1977)
- Bored—nothing to do! (1978)
- Oh, Were They Ever Happy! (1978)
- The Legend of New Amsterdam (1979)
- Nothing Like a Fresh Coat of Paint (1980)
- People (1980)
- Peter Spier's Village Board Books (1981)
  - Bill's Service Station
  - Firehouse
  - The Toy Shop
  - My School
  - Pet Store
  - Food Market
- Peter Spier's Christmas
- Peter Spier's Little Bible Storybooks
  - Genesis creation narrative|The Creation
  - Noah
  - Jonah
- Peter Spier's Little Animal Books
  - Little Cats
  - Little Dogs
  - Little Ducks
  - Little Rabbits
- Dreams
- We the People: The Constitution of the United States (1987)
- Peter Spier's Advent Calendar: Little Town of Bethlehem
- Peter Spier's Advent Calendar: Silent Night, Holy Night
- Rain (1982)
- Christmas! (1983)
- The Book Of Jonah (1985)
- Big Trucks, Little Trucks (1988)
- Fast Cars, Slow Cars (1988)
- Here Come The Fire Trucks (1988)
- Trucks That Dig And Dump (1988)
- Circus (1995)

== As illustrator ==
- The Cow Who Fell in the Canal (1957), by Phyllis Krasilovsky
- Wonder Tales of Seas and Ships (1957), by Frances Carpenter
- Hans Brinker, or The Silver Skates (1958), by Mary Mapes Dodge (1865, revised 1876)
- Betty Crocker's Guide to Easy Entertaining (1959)
- Tales from the House Behind (1962), by Anne Frank
- The Sailing Ship (1964), by Jan de Hartog
- History of the Theater (1964), by Hannelore Marek
- Great Furniture Styles, 1660–1830 (1965), by Donald D. MacMillan
- Elizabethan England (1965), by Anthony West
- Here and There: 100 poems about places (1967), compiled by Elinor Parker
- The Erie Canal (1970), an edition of "Low Bridge" by Thomas S. Allen (1905), "includes musical notation"
- The Star-Spangled Banner (1973), an edition of "The Star-Spangled Banner" by Francis Scott Key (1814) —"includes music, background history, and pictures of flags"
- "A Traveler’s Tale of Ancient Tikal," National Geographic (December 1975), pp. 799–811.
- We The People: The Constitution Of The United States Of America (1987) —"includes the text of the Constitution of the United States", a bicentennial edition of the US Constitution
- The Last Hurdle (1988), by F. K. Brown (1953)
- The Little Riders (1988), by Margaretha Shemin —later adapted as a Disney film
