= Tim Hart =

English folk singer (1948–2009)

- Born: 9 January 1948; Lincoln, Lincolnshire, England
- Died: 24 December 2009 (aged 61) La Gomera, Canary Islands, Spain
- Genre: British folk rock
- Occupations: Musician; singer; writer; photographer
- Instruments: Guitar; dulcimer; keyboards; banjo; mandolin; percussion; vocals
- Years active: 1966–88, 1995, 2008
- Formerly of: Steeleye Span

Tim Hart (9 January 1948 – 24 December 2009) was an English folk singer and multi-instrumentalist, best known as a founding member of British folk rock band Steeleye Span.

== Early years ==
Tim Hart was born in Lincoln, England, but moved to St Albans in Hertfordshire at a relatively young age: his father, the Rev. Canon Dennis Hart, was successively perpetual curate then vicar of St Saviour's church in Sandpit Lane, St Albans from 1955 to 1992. Hart began his life as a musician performing with the Rattfinks, St Albans School's second band, the first being The Zombies. In 1966, he began performing with Blackpool-born folk singer Maddy Prior, touring English folk clubs. In 1968 and 1969 the duo recorded two albums: Folk Songs of Olde England, Volumes One and Two.

== Steeleye Span ==
From 1970 to 1982, Hart and Prior were the backbone of Steeleye Span. Hart's contribution to the band demonstrated his musical abilities on a wide range of instruments, some electric, including: acoustic guitars, lap dulcimer, organ, five string banjo, mandolin, bells, tabor and spoons as well as vocals.

In 1971, as well as recording two albums as part of Steeleye Span, they recorded Summer Solstice – a much more professional recording than their first two albums, including a string arrangement by Robert Kirby, better known for his work with Nick Drake. Almost every song that Hart sang was traditional. Steeleye Span's commercial success peaked in 1975. They toured in the United States and Australia and used electric instruments more frequently. However, further hits eluded them. They announced that their 1978 tour of the United Kingdom would be their farewell, although they reformed and were still active as both a live and a recorded act in 2024.

== Fragmentation ==
Hart took this opportunity to release a solo album, Tim Hart, in 1979. Steeleye Span members Maddy Prior, Rick Kemp, and Nigel Pegrum contributed vocals, bass, drums, and percussion.. Hart appeared on one more Steeleye Span record, Sails of Silver, before resigning in 1982. His last gig was at the Theatre Royal, Norwich.

In 1981, Hart released two albums of nursery rhymes originally written for his own children on the Music for Pleasure label. He used most of Steeleye Span, and other musicians who had small children and could take the project seriously. In a bold move, he became a record producer for a rock band, The Monochrome Set. Their album Eligible Bachelors was a whimsical cynical view of relations between the sexes.

Hart's health seriously declined, and in 1988 he emigrated to La Gomera, a small island in the Canary Islands. Abandoning music altogether, he became a full-time writer and photographer, married again, built himself a house on the side of a mountain, and restored his health. As there was no guidebook to La Gomera available in English, Hart wrote, and took most of the photographs for, La Gomera: A Guide to the Unspoiled Canary Island (2004).

== The Journey ==
In 1995, Hart was persuaded to return to the United Kingdom for a five-hour marathon concert performance in aid of the charity War Child, and featured nearly every member of Steeleye Span. A recording of the concert, The Journey, appeared in 1999. Hart also appeared occasionally as a support act on Steeleye Span tours, opening the show with a solo set and typically joining the band on stage for the encore.

For many years he did not perform outside of La Gomera. However, Hart performed with Maddy Prior as part of the BBC Electric Proms on 23 October 2008.

== Illness and death ==
In December 2008, Hart was diagnosed with inoperable lung cancer, and returned to England with his wife Conny to seek continuing medical treatment. It was announced during Steeleye Span's 2009 winter tour that Park Records would be reissuing Hart's recordings of nursery rhymes to support him through his illness. He and his wife returned to their home in La Gomera in early December 2009, where he died in the early morning of 24 December 2009, aged 61. He was cremated at a private ceremony with half of his ashes being scattered over La Gomera, and the other half being returned to his family plot in St Albans.

== Discography ==
Tim Hart and Maddy Prior

- Folk Songs of Olde England Vol. 1 (1968)
- Folk Songs of Olde England Vol. 2 (1968)
- Summer Solstice (1971)

The above three albums were reissued in 2003 as "Heydays" a double CD

Tim Hart

- Tim Hart (1979) Chrysalis CHR 1218

Tim Hart and Friends

- My Very Favourite Nursery Rhyme Record (1981)
- The Drunken Sailor and other Kids Songs (1983)

The above two albums were reissued twice, as:

- Favourite Childrens Songs – two vinyl discs held in a single sleeve
- My Very Favourite Nursery Rhyme Record - a double CD in 2010

== Books ==
- Throbs (1978)
- La Gomera: A Guide to the Unspoiled Canary Island (2004)
