= Inez Catalon =

American Creole singer (1913–1994)

- Born: September 23, 1913; Maurice, Louisiana, U.S.
- Origin: Kaplan, Vermilion Parish, Louisiana, U.S.
- Died: November 23, 1994 (aged 81) Kaplan, Louisiana
- Genres: Creole music
- Instrument: Vocals
- Years active: 1974–1994
- Labels: Rounder; Folkways

Inez Catalon (c. September 23, 1913^{[a]} – November 23, 1994) was an American Creole ballad singer, who was one of the most well-known performers of the genre known as Louisiana "home music". These are a cappella versions of ballads and love songs, drinking songs, game songs, lullabies and waltzes performed by women in the home, passed down from earlier generations to provide entertainment for the family before radio and television existed. Home music is not considered part of the public performance repertoire of Cajun and zydeco music because the songs were sung in the home by women, rather than in the dance halls of southwestern Louisiana which featured almost exclusively male performers.

Catalon was a recipient of a 1993 National Heritage Fellowship awarded by the National Endowment for the Arts, which is the United States government's highest honor in the folk and traditional arts.

== Early life ==
Inez Catalon was born in Maurice, Louisiana and grew up in nearby Kaplan, Louisiana, the youngest of ten children with German, Spanish, French and African ancestry. Her great-grandmother was an enslaved person.

The family lived in a house in Kaplan built by her father in the 1920s. Her father was a farmer who died when Catalon was a child. Both of Catalon's parents spoke Creole French rather than English. Both parents sang, but her mother was her greatest influence as a singer, with a "beautiful deep, rich" voice that young Inez tried to replicate. Her mother did not consider her to be a very good singer because her "tongue was too heavy". By the time Inez was a child, all but one of her older siblings had moved away from the home but none of Catalon's sisters were interested in learning the songs that were passed down from prior generations. Inez, however, enjoyed learning the cantiques (songs that originated in France) that her mother knew, spending most of her day singing songs on the steps of the family home. Inez Catalon never received formal schooling, due to the death of her father which required the Catalon children to go to work.

== Career ==
Catalon worked as a domestic for much of her adult life. However, she enjoyed singing on a stage. Her performance style has been described as "saucy" and that some of her songs were considered "risqué". One music scholar described Catalon as "a vibrant tell-it-like-it-is character with a wealth of music, jokes, and stories within her". She was most well-known for her unaccompanied performances of songs that told their stories through a series of vignettes, passed down from her French-speaking ancestors. She also enjoyed singing other styles of traditional music as well as popular songs of the day, including blues, jazz, Tin Pan Alley and Jimmie Rodgers tunes.

Catalon's first public singing performance was in 1974 at the inaugural "Tribute to Cajun Music" which later evolved into the Festivals Acadiens et Créoles. She was the first performer to take the stage at that 1974 event. Afterwards, she performed at many music festivals across the United States, including both the 1976 and 1983 Festivals of American Folklife in Washington, D.C. She also toured as part of the "A la mode de chez nous" concert series featuring French-American music and dance, sponsored by the National Council for the Traditional Arts.

In Louisiana, she performed several times during the mid-1980s at the Louisiana Folklife Festival in Baton Rouge as well as appearances at both the Festivals Acadiens et Créoles and Festival International de Louisiane in Lafayette.

Catalon was also a frequent performer at the New Orleans Jazz & Heritage Festival, usually accompanied by folk singer and folklorist Marce Lacouture. Lacouture is from Texas but has Cajun ancestry on her father's side, which she began to explore in the early 1980s by spending time doing research in Acadiana. By 1983, she had met ballad singers Catalon and Lula Landry from whom Lacouture was learning the old French a capella songs, as well as Cajun and Creole cultural history. In 1986, Lacouture was awarded a grant from the National Endowment for the Arts to formally apprentice with Catalon and Landry, as an attempt to preserve the old, traditional songs associated with home music. This was followed by another apprenticeship grant in 1987–1988 from the Louisiana Folklife Program. The relationship was more than just professional, as Lacouture became a close friend to both women, learning from them in their homes and being treated as if she was a granddaughter.

Catalon and Lacouture performed together at the New Orleans Jazz Festival at least six times between 1986 and 1994. At her successful but final Jazz Fest performance in 1994, the "sweet but very outspoken" Catalon chastised the women in the audience for "dressing immodestly" and flipped the hem of her ankle-length dress towards the crowd as she left the stage. Lacouture said it was Catalon's "way of getting the last word" and was her "unique way of bidding farewell to her audience". Catalon died seven months after that performance.

== Personal life ==
Catalon was Catholic. She lived throughout her life in the house that her father built.

Catalon had two children, including her son John Chargois and daughter Mary A. Chargois. At the time of her death, Catalon had nine grandchildren and two great-grandchildren.

Catalon died in her sleep on November 23, 1994, at Abrom Kaplan Memorial Hospital in Kaplan, Louisiana as a result of long-standing heart problems. She was buried in Maurice Cemetery.

== Legacy ==
In 1973, Catalon shared a traditional Louisiana tale with folklorist Barry Jean Ancelet. That tale was adapted into a children's book in French titled Qui Est le Plus Fort? (Who is the Strongest?) published originally in 1999 and for which Catalon received credit as a contributor; it was reissued as a second edition in 2014.

At the 1989 New Orleans Jazz & Heritage Festival, Catalon, Lula Landry and Marce Lacouture were interviewed by Nick Spitzer on the Allison Miner Music Heritage Stage. The archive of that interview plus 33 others comprise the "Crescent City Living Legends Collection", which was selected in 2002 by the Library of Congress for inclusion in the National Recording Registry for being "culturally, historically, or aesthetically significant".

The certificate Catalon received in 1993 from the National Endowment for the Arts as part of her National Heritage Fellowship recognized her "as a master traditionalist artist who has contributed to the shaping of our artistic tradition and to preserving the cultural diversity of the United States".

In 2000, Lacouture released her first solo CD (re-released in 2004), titled La Joie Cadienne that includes the songs "Inez" and "Lula" which are tributes to the women who were her major influences and mentors.

A theme of the 2019 Festivals Acadiens et Créoles was a celebration of the role of women in Cajun and Creole music, and included a day long symposium titled "La Femme et les Filles: Female Perspectives in Cajun and Creole Culture". Catalon was one of the women balladeers celebrated for preserving the traditional songs associated with Louisiana home music.

== Discography ==
Catalon had no solo albums or singles, so sound recordings of her performances are found only on various artist compilation albums.

- Zodico: Louisiana Creole Music (1976, Rounder Records, RR 6009) ): includes four songs by Catalon; one music critic has described this album as the "widest spectrum of Creole music collected on one record"
- Louisiana Creole Music (1978, Folkways Records, FA 2622): includes three songs and two stories by Catalon
- Louisiana Folk Masters: Women's Home Music (2007, Louisiana Crossroads Records, LCR CD 2002-3): includes five songs by Catalon; this album was the biggest selling CD at the 2007 Festivals Acadiens et Créoles
- La Musique de la Maison: Women & Home Music in South Louisiana (2008, Origin Jazz Library, OJL-3001): includes three songs by Catalon; all 34 of the songs by 15 artists were recorded by folklorists between the late 1940s and 1977

== Filmography ==
Catalon was featured in two documentaries about Creole music and culture in Louisiana.

- Les Créoles (1976, Société Radio-Canada), part three of a four-part documentary series titled Le Son de Cajuns; part three focuses on the black French-speaking culture in Louisiana and includes Catalon in interview and performance sequences.
- In 1984, Catalon was featured in an episode of the Louisiana Educational Television Authority series En Francais that included interviews with Catalon, her brother Lionel, and two friends as well as a few song performances.

== Notes ==
a. Sources vary on birth date; see talk page discussion
