= Levee Town =

Studio album by Sonny Landreth
- Released: 2000; Expanded Edition 2009
- Recorded: 1998–2000; Dockside Studio; WestWind Media
- Genre: Blues Rock Cajun Zydeco
- Label: Sugar Hill Records 2000; LandFall Records 2009
- Producer: Landreth, Post, Field

Sonny Landreth chronology
| South of I-10 (1995) | Levee Town (2000) | From the Reach (2007) |

Levee Town is the seventh studio album by Sonny Landreth. Released on Sugar Hill Records October 17, 2000 and re-released in an Expanded Edition on Landreth's own LandFall Records April 21, 2009.

== Overview ==
Levee Town expands on the themes and musical styles exhibited on Landreth's first two major label releases Outward Bound (1992) and South of I-10 (1995). The record shows a maturity in writing and production as well as a continuing evolution in Landreth's unique slide guitar playing. The production utilizes a mixture of arrangement styles that befits the range of musical material - introspective singer songwriter ("Love and Glory"); bare bones 3 piece instrumentals ("Z. Rider"); “double-clutch” Zydeco grooves ("The U.S.S. Zydecoldsmobile"); Memphis style horn arrangements ("Angeline"); swamp pop ("Soul Salvation"); a mash up of New Orleans musical textures ("Deep South"); and the exuberant bayou groove and guitar showcase of the title song ("Levee Town"). Front and center throughout is Landreth's exceptional slide guitar.

== Writing ==
Landreth toured extensively for two years after the 1995 release of South of I-10, but during that time he began to write the songs that would form the core of his next album. Levee Town contains story songs reflecting his life and friends around his Louisiana home. Inspiration cited by Landreth for the songs comes from a wide mix of influences; Robbie Robertson's writing for The Band; Joseph Campbell's works on myth; Kahlil Gibran's The Prophet; Richard Ford's novel The Sportswriter; Longfellow's Evangeline; Plato's Protagoras; a 1982 Oldsmobile 98 beast of a car that was a gift to Landreth from his parents; and as always the legends, music, myth, and people of the Louisiana Gulf Coast Bayou region where Landreth grew up and still lives.

All of the songs on the album were written solely by Landreth except "Angeline" which is a collaboration with songwriter Will Jennings. Jennings also co wrote "For Who We Are (The Night Bird Sings)" which was recorded for Levee Town (featuring Jennifer Warnes) but not released until the 2009 Expanded Edition. "The Going On", a song collaboration with songwriter Wendy Waldman, was written and recorded for Levee Town but not included on the record. It was later re-recorded and released on Landreth's 2008 album From the Reach.

Demos for the songs took shape at Landreth's home studio throughout 1996–1997. By 1998 music producer and TV/film composer Mike Post had become a friend of Landreth's and expressed an interest in the project. Post offered his WestWind Media studio in Burbank CA as a place to record basic tracks. WestWind Media was primarily a post-production facility but one wing of the building contained a large well designed tracking room and a control room with a vintage Neve console making the studio a perfect place to capture live tracks.

== Recording ==
Tracking and overdubs took place at WestWind throughout 1998 with Landreth (guitars), longtime associate David Ranson (bass), and Michael Organ (drummer) tracking the songs live. Ranson a well known and well regarded bass player from Louisiana had performed and recorded with Landreth for three decades and understood the nuances of the music better than anyone. Organ, an accomplished rock drummer with enough finesse to capture the Louisiana groove influences of the music, had played with Landreth since 1995. Mike Post provided production and arrangement support and played keyboards. Post associate Cary Butler was the primary engineer. Some overdubbing was also completed in a secondary studio at Mike Post Productions.

Basic tracks recorded with Post that appear on the final record are – "Levee Town", "This River", "Love and Glory", "Spider-Gris", "Godchild", "Turning With the Century", "Angeline", and "Deep South". On "Godchild" and "Deep South" Landreth had become very fond of the guitar tracks he had recorded on demos in his home studio, so the ADAT demos were transferred to 24 Track 2 inch tape, the bass and drum tracks were then replaced at WestWind by Ranson and Organ - keeping the demo guitar tracks intact.

In 1999 and 2000 tracking and overdubbing moved to Dockside Studio in Maurice just outside Lafayette, Louisiana. Dockside was owned by Landreth's friends Steve and Cézanne Nails and was another studio with a great Neve recording console and an ample tracking room as well as the advantage of being close to home for Landreth. David Ranson (bass) and Michael Organ (drummer) were once again the rhythm section and long time Landreth friends Tony Daigle (engineer) and R.S. Field (producer) worked on the tracks. Songs recorded at Dockside included "The U.S.S. Zydecoldsmobile", "Broken Hearted Road", "Z. Rider", and "Soul Salvation". Several other tracks were also recorded, some for a proposed instrumental album that was never completed. Three of those tracks, "Pedal To Metal", "Old Flame", and "Fare You Well", appear on the 2009 Expanded Edition release.

=== Guests ===
Many of Landreth's longtime musical friends appear as guests on Levee Town. Steve Conn (Keyboards on most tracks); Stephen Bruton (guitar on "Soul Salvation"); Bonnie Raitt (vocals on "Soul Salvation"); John Hiatt (vocals on "Levee Town"); Marce LaCouture (vocals); Michael Doucet (fiddle); Errol Verret (accordion); Danny Kimbal (rubboard); Zydeco Joe Mouton (accordion). Jennifer Warnes and Herb Pedersen, both accomplished singers in their own right, sing background vocals on most of the album. The Legendary White Trash Horns appear on both "Angeline" and "Deep South". The horn parts were recorded as overdubs at Dockside with arrangement help from Post. Bonnie Raitt's vocal contribution to "Soul Salvation" was recorded at Windmill Lane Studios in Dublin Ireland while she was on a trip abroad.

=== Mixing ===
Recording and overdubs for the album were completed by summer of 2000 and mixing for Levee Town was handled primarily at Dockside Studio by a combination of Landreth, Daigle, and Field.

== Release, reception, and re-release ==
After over two years of production, and the complications of Landreth changing labels and management, Levee Town was released in October 2000 on Sugar Hill Records. Critical reception was very favorable, but Sugar Hill may not have been able to supply appropriate publicity and promotional efforts for the record. Sales for Levee Town were minimal and it was several years before Landreth rekindled the momentum in his solo career.

Professional ratings
Review scores
| Source | Rating |
|---|---|
| Allmusic | link |

In 2002 Jimmy Buffett recorded the Levee Town track "The U.S.S. Zydecoldsmobile" on his Far Side of the World (album) and featured Landreth on the record. Over the next few years Landreth continued to build momentum with touring, a 2003 release of his own, guest appearances on albums with friends such as Little Feat, and Mark Knopfler, and a much touted 2007 appearance at Eric Clapton's Crossroads Guitar Festival in Chicago. Landreth's 2008 album From the Reach was the first release on his own label, LandFall Records, and featured contributions from Eric Clapton, Mark Knopfler, Dr. John and Vince Gill among others. By 2009 Landreth was once again on firm footing and the idea for a re-release of Levee Town became a possibility. He had fortunately insisted on owning the rights to the master recordings in his original contract with Sugar Hill so in April 2009 Levee Town Expanded Edition with five additional tracks was released on LandFall Records. Reception was once again very positive, with most critics praising the work even more than in 2000.

A 2005 commentary in The Nation magazine by journalist Alexander Cockburn on the difficulties and profiteering surrounding reconstruction of New Orleans after Hurricane Katrina quotes the Sonny Landreth song "Levee Town" with the line "Don't be surprised at who shows up, down in the Levee Town."

== Album cover Grammy nomination ==
The cover for Levee Town features the design work of Megan Barra and the photography of Jack Spencer both longtime friends of Landreth's. The cover and Megan Barra were nominated for the 2002 Grammy Award for Best Recording Package.

== Track listing ==
1. "Levee Town" - Sonny Landreth 6:28
2. "This River" - Landreth 4:20
3. "The U.S.S. Zydecoldsmobile" - Landreth 5:20
4. "Love and Glory" - Landreth 4:16
5. "Broken Hearted Road" - Landreth 4:40
6. "Spider-Gris" - Landreth 3:41
7. "Godchild" - Landreth 5:09
8. "Turning with the Century" – Landreth 4:33
9. "Z. Rider" - Landreth 4:05
10. "Soul Salvation" - Landreth 2:56
11. "Angeline" - Landreth, Will Jennings 3:59
12. "Deep South" - Landreth 6:26

== 2009 Expanded Edition bonus tracks ==
1. "Pedal To Metal" - Landreth 4:09
2. "For Who We Are (The Night Bird Sings)" - Landreth, Jennings 3:22
3. "Old Flame" - Landreth 4:04
4. "Road A Plenty" - Landreth 2:37
5. "Fare You Well" - Landreth 3:32

== Personnel ==
- Sonny Landreth: Guitar, Vocals, Producer, Horn, Arrangements, Mixing
- David Ranson: Bass
- Michael Organ: Drums, Percussion
- Steve Conn: Keyboards
- Sam Broussard: Acoustic Guitar
- Stephen Bruton: Leslie Guitar
- Michael Doucet: Fiddle
- Errol Verret: Accordion
- Joseph "Zydeco Joe" Mouton: Accordion, Rubboard
- Danny Kimball: Rubboard
- The Legendary White Trash Horns -Steve Howard: Trumpet, Horn Arrangements. Jon Smith: Tenor Saxophone, Horn Arrangements
- Bonnie Raitt: Background Vocals
- John Hiatt: Background Vocals
- Jennifer Warnes: Background Vocals
- Herb Pedersen: Background Vocals
- Marce LaCouture: Background Vocals
- Mike Post: Keyboards, Producer, Horn Arrangements
- R.S. Field: Producer, Chant, Mixing
- Engineering, Mastering, Technical: Tony Daigle, Cary Butler, Paul Wight, Ed Rogers, Ciaran Cahill, Mark Ellison, Justin Niebank, Jim DeMain, Billy Gosser, Joe Glaser, Kye Kennedy.
