= You Still Got Me =

You Still Got Me may refer to:

== Music ==
- You Still Got Me (Beth Hart album), a 2024 album by Beth Hart
- You Still Got Me (Doug Supernaw album), a 1995 album by Doug Supernaw
- "You Still Got Me", a song by Andy Stott, 2010
- "You Still Got Me", a song by Beth Hart, 2024

== See also ==
- "You Still Get Me High", by Kylie Minogue from Tension
