= Michael Organ (drummer) =

American rock 'n' roll drummer (born 1953)

Background information
- Born: July 20, 1953 (age 73); Carlisle, Indiana, U.S.
- Genres: Rock; Blues; Country; Roots rock
- Instruments: Drums; Keyboards; Percussion
- Years active: 1973–2004
- Labels: Associated With; Epic Records; Polygram Records; Sugar Hill Records
- Website: Michael Organ

Michael Organ (born 1953 Carlisle, Indiana) is an American rock drummer, best known for performing and recording with Sonny Landreth and Henry Lee Summer. Organ was a part of a number of country and bluegrass albums from the 1980s into the 1990s. He also recorded with Jimmy Buffett and a number of other country artists. He was an active musician as of 2009.

== Career ==
Michael Organ played drums with pop/rock singer Henry Lee Summer from 1983 to 1992 including work on all four of Summer's album releases for Epic Records as well as the 1988 single Darlin' Danielle Don't, the 1989 top twenty single Hey Baby, and the 1993 single Ain't That Love.

Organ later performed and recorded with legendary slide guitarist Sonny Landreth from 1995 to 2001 including work on the 2000 release Levee Town on Sugar Hill Records. Levee Town was re-released in April 2009 with additional tracks from the original recording sessions.

During the 1990s, Organ lived in Nashville, Tennessee, working as a session musician and performing with such roots rock artists as Danny Flowers, Tim Krekel, Pat McLaughlin, Gary Nicholson, Michael Henderson, Sheila Lawrence, and Tom Ovans. During that period, Organ also recorded with Jimmy Buffett, recorded and toured with the Amazing Rhythm Aces, and performed with Bo Diddley - as well as working with country music artists Lionel Cartwright, Lee Roy Parnell, Kevin Welch, Highway 101, Claudia Church, and Deborah Allen.

Organ also recorded and performed in the mid-1990s with Canadian Polygram Records rock recording artist Sue Medley and the Toronto duo Lost & Profound (Lisa Boudreau and Terry Tompkins) playing on their 1994 Polygram release Memory Thief produced by Richard Bennett.

In 1999, Organ began a music project with the creative dance and movement educator Margot Faught. Organ composed rhythmic tracks to be used in dance and movement classes which were compiled into the CD Zuni Movement. Ms. Faught utilized the CD in teaching seminars internationally, including her work for the New York City Center Project Dance program as well as the New York arts organization Together In Dance.

In 2004, Organ composed music for Current, a project by multidisciplinary performance group Susurrus that is still in performance.

== Discography ==
2009 Sonny Landreth - Levee Town Expanded Edition - LandFall
2000 Sonny Landreth - Levee Town - Sugar Hill
1995 Sonny Landreth - Son of Native Stepson - Zoo/BMG EP
1996 Tom Ovans - Nuclear Sky - Demon
1995 Jimmy Buffett - Margaritaville Cafe: Late Night Gumbo - Margaritaville
1994 Lost and Profound - Memory Thief - Polygram
1992 Sue Medley - I Am Alive - Polygram EP
1993 Henry Lee Summer - SlamDunk - Epic
1991 Henry Lee Summer - Way Past Midnight - Epic
1989 Henry Lee Summer - I've Got Everything - Epic
1988 Henry Lee Summer - Henry Lee Summer - Epic

== Equipment ==
During his career Organ was an endorsing artist for Drum Workshop Drums, Sabian Cymbals, and Pro-Mark drum sticks.
