= French Louisiana =

Louisiana territories

The flag of French Louisiana

The term French Louisiana (French: Louisiane française [lwizjan fʁɑ̃sɛːz]; Louisiana Creole: Lwizyàn françé) refers to two distinct, historical regions:

- First, to historic French Louisiana, comprising the massive, middle section of North America claimed by France during the 17th and 18th centuries; and,
- Second, to modern French Louisiana, which stretches across the southern third of the present-day State of Louisiana, also called Acadia, Cajun Country, or Creole Country.

Each term has been in use for many years.

In contemporary cultural discourse, Louisiana French (particularly Cajun) culture has multiple dimensions. Firstly, concerning its origins, it is widely regarded as a culture of mixed origins. It is not the culture of a single ethnic group but was jointly shaped by the different immigrant groups who historically settled in Louisiana, including the original French settlers, Acadians, Spanish, Irish, as well as Black and White Creoles, among others. Furthermore, other Creole groups and Native American groups also made contributions to the region's culture, for instance, the use of filé in the culinary specialty gumbo originates from Native Americans, and these collectively form the region's unique cultural mosaic.

Against this backdrop of mixed culture, another definition is the emphasis placed by many Cajuns on the "blood" relationship with the Acadians from the Canadian Maritimes Provinces, which gives rise to a strong sense of belonging to the broader Acadian diaspora, transcending geographical boundaries.

== French Louisiana, district of New France ==
New France, including French Louisiana and French Canada

French Louisiana was one of the districts of New France and included the future territory of Arkansas, Illinois, Louisiana, and Missouri. Beginning in 1682 this region, known in French as la Louisiane française, functioned as an administrative district of New France. It extended from the Gulf of Mexico to Vincennes, now in Indiana. France ceded the Western part of the region to Spain and the Eastern part to Britain in 1763 after the French and Indian War. They regained the Western territory by treaty in 1800, and sold it to the United States in 1803 through the Louisiana Purchase.

Louisiana French Map, 2015

Following the Louisiana Purchase and the Governance Act, the vast territory of colonial French Louisiana became part of the United States. While the political entity of French Louisiana ceased to exist, French language, culture, and identity persisted, particularly concentrated in the southern part of the present-day state of Louisiana, Despite American governance, southern Louisiana remained francophone, dominated by diverse French and French Creole communities, including white Creoles, Cajuns, creole free people of colour, and French speaking enslaved people. This region, which is often referred to today as "French Louisiana" or "Cajun Country" and "Creole Country", is known for its cultural heritage. "Creole and Cajun culture are unique examples of Louisiana’s eclectic history”. Modern French Louisiana is separate from the historical administrative district that once stretched across the American Midwest.

== Modern French Louisiana ==
The flag of New Orleans

The flag of Acadiana

The flag of the United Houma Nation

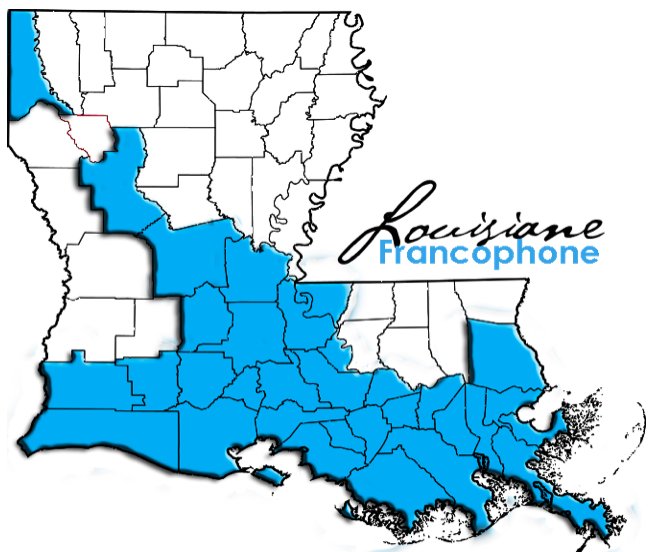
Modern French Louisiana

Greater New Orleans and the twenty-two parish cultural region known as Acadiana compose present-day 'French Louisiana'. Although the Louisiana French (Cajuns & Creoles) dominate south Louisiana's cultural landscape, the largest French-speaking group in the state is thought to be the United Houma Nation Native American tribe. Other important ethnic groups in the region include African Americans, Isleños, descendants of German Coast settlers, Filipinos, non-French related Caucasian American (including Irish Americans and Italian Americans), and various immigrant groups, including Vietnamese, Laotians, and a growing number of Hispanics. In addition, French Louisiana influences can be found in cities adjacent to the region, such as Alexandria and Baton Rouge.

== French Louisiana cultural regions ==
Modern French Louisiana refers to the region in southern Louisiana where French-derived culture and language are still prominent. This area is described as a roughly triangular region with an apex below Alexandria and a base extending from New Orleans to Lake Charles. Within this larger triangular area, there are two main French-derived cultural regions:

The area west of the Atchafalaya Swamp is located in Louisiana's coastal wetlands and southwest prairie. It is a region where French-derived groups are dominant, including Acadians, French nationals, French royalists, etc. This region is commonly known as "Cajun Country" or officially called "Acadiana". The descendants of Acadians (known as Cajuns) historically settled in this region. Major parishes within Acadiana include Lafayette, St. Landry, Iberia, St. Martin, Acadia, and Vermilion.

Although Cajun culture is a product of the mixture of various immigrant groups, many Cajuns emphasize their Acadian ancestry. Its center is located "around Lafayette”. Historically, before 1919, this area was often called "Teche Country" named after Bayou Teche, which runs through the region. These bayous and waterways were the main transportation routes before roads were built. The cultural history of Southwest Louisiana (which is part of this region) indicates that in the early 20th century, the area had a unified, multiracial Creole culture and identity, but later split along racial lines under the influence of Americanisation. The "Acadianized identity and culture" emphasizing white Acadian ancestry emerged in the first half of the 20th century.

The area east of the Atchafalaya Swamp is along the Mississippi River and Bayou Lafourche, between Baton Rouge and New Orleans. Compared to the western region, this area is more cosmopolitan, influenced by people from the West Indies (including Haitian refugees), Germans, Spaniards, and Americans from up the Mississippi River (“Kaintucks”). This area also includes French or Creole language speakers who are Catholic.

The New Orleans metropolitan region, encompassing Orleans Parish and adjacent Mississippi River parishes, has long been associated with Louisiana Creole heritage and Afro-French cultural traditions.

New Orleans is one of the centres of this area, described as Creole cultural centre, influenced by Haitian Creole culture. Near New Orleans live French or Creole-speaking Catholic peasants.

== Modern use of Louisiana French ==
Louisiana French is a variety of French used in the state of Louisiana in the United States. In contemporary times, Louisiana French is undergoing the process of “language death”, but at the same time, its culture and community are also showing efforts towards revitalisation.

=== The endangerment of Louisiana French ===
Louisiana French does not simply originate from Canadian Acadian French. It is a product of the contact, “dialect mixing”, and "levelling/convergence" of various French varieties during the colonial period. These varieties came from mainland France, Quebec, Acadia, Saint-Domingue and other places. This multi-source mixing makes Louisiana French more like a "patchwork regio-lect”.

Louisiana French is in the process of gradually dying out. After the 1921 state constitution stipulated that only English could be used for teaching in public schools, students speaking French and Creole were punished and discriminated against, which accelerated the language decline. People were told their French was "not authentic" and not worth keeping. According to the 2013 estimate, there are approximately 100,000 speakers. This number is a decrease from around 1 million francophone speakers in the late 1960s. From 1980 to 2023, the share of Louisiana French spoken at home declined from a peak of around 6.5% to below 3.5%, showing a long-term downward trend. Its status as a "home language" is gradually being replaced by Spanish and other emerging immigrant languages. Moreover, Louisiana French has long been in contact with English. English is the dominant language and the high-status language in society. This asymmetrical linguistic environment has also affected the gradual decline of Louisiana French.

In the context of endangerment, the group known as "semi-speakers" has emerged; their language acquisition is often incomplete, and they show different linguistic features and greater variability compared to fluent native speakers.

The older generation before World War II typically used French or related Creole as their native tongue. People who grew up in the "60s and 70s" mainly learned English at home. The younger generation (Millennials, etc.) mostly grew up in English-speaking environments, and if they learned French, it was usually out of conscious choice or through school programs.

=== Kouri-Vini ===
In Louisiana, there is another related language, Kouri-Vini, also known as Louisiana Creole. It is an independent endangered language, mixed from French vocabulary of the French colonial period and African language influences. Kouri-Vini mainly developed in historical sugarcane growing areas, was used by white and black people regardless of race, and was more related to geographic regions than race. The number of Kouri-Vini speakers is much smaller than the number of Louisiana French speakers, speakers number “far fewer than 10,000”.

=== The revitalisation of Louisiana French ===
French revitalisation activities are ongoing in the Louisiana region. In 2020, "there are 34 immersion programs in 14 parishes across Louisiana with more than 5,000 students enrolled". There are also immersion programs for adults. Teachers in these schools may come from different French-speaking countries; teaching local French varieties is also encouraged. French is not just a language, but also an important vehicle for carrying the unique culture of Louisiana.

New French media platforms are emerging, such as the digital newspaper Le Louisianais (publishing content in both Louisiana French and Kouri-Vini), and the television channel Télé-Louisiane. Radio station KRVS also has French programming.

People use and promote French through regular gatherings (such as French conversation at the Blue Moon Saloon), cultural festivals (such as Festival Acadiens et Créoles), to use and promote French. Artists, musicians, and writers also promote the language through their works.

Louisiana has become an observer member of the Organisation Internationale de la Francophonie (OIF).

== Cultural heritage ==
=== Architecture ===
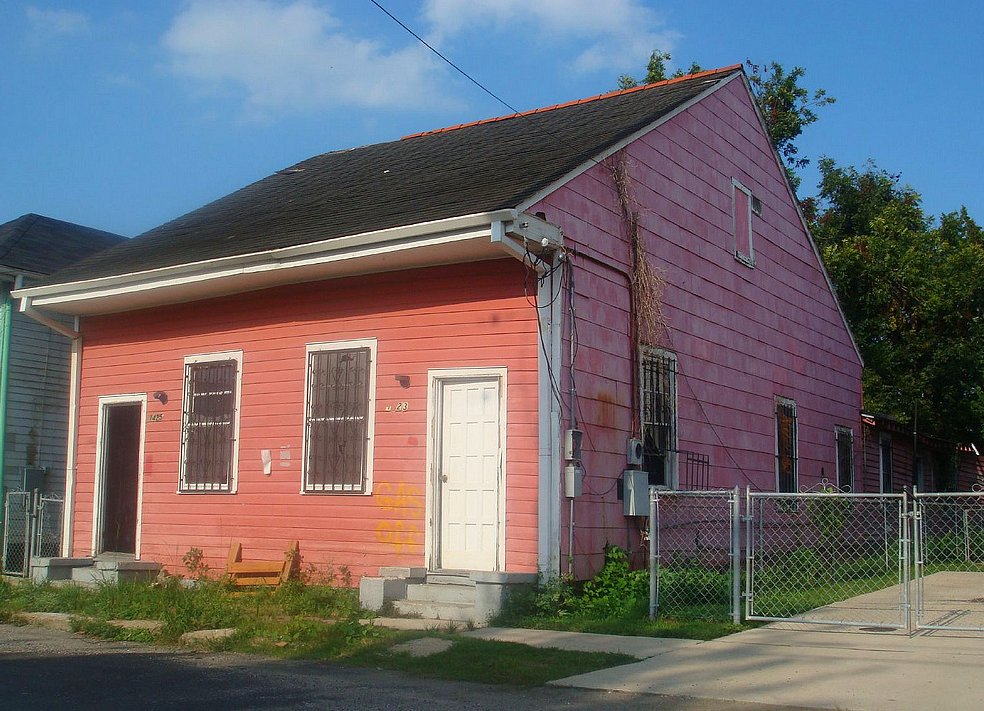
Creole Cottage 1423 Annette Street New Orleans

Louisiana's architectural heritage is a component of its unique culture, especially the Creole style architecture formed under the influence of French and Spanish colonial periods and the Caribbean region. This architectural style does not simply replicate the house styles of mainland France or Spain, but rather, while drawing on various cultural sources (including France, Britain, Spain, Canada, and the Caribbean region), it adapted to the unique subtropical humid climate and geographical environment of frequent floods. For example, the design of raising the main living area above the ground (usually a few feet to a full story high) is a main feature developed to cope with damp soil and the threat of floods. Early Creole construction methods also reflected cultural fusion. For instance, a mixture called bousillage was often used for wall infill a method that combined French building techniques with local Native American use of earth and plant materials.

The Vieux Carré Commission (VCC), which was established in 1936, is the core agency responsible for official historic preservation work in the French Quarter (I.e., the Vieux Carré) in New Orleans. The VCC develops and enforces strict guidelines to ensure that any building renovations or new constructions in this area are compatible with the historical appearance, emphasising the preservation of historical features, and modern alterations that would damage the historical integrity or significance of the buildings are not encouraged.

Historical areas including the French Quarter (Vieux Carré) in New Orleans have buildings that are living testaments to the interwoven influences of French, Spanish, and Caribbean cultures. The unique building types and styles in these areas, such as the Creole Cottage and Creole Townhouse, are preserved in modern times through systematic historical preservation efforts.

Some modern building projects, even newly constructed townhouses, reference the style and materials of historical buildings in their design to integrate into their historical community environment. Although certain very traditional structural forms may no longer be common, their iconic external features continue in new communities in the form of "pastiche" or imitation.

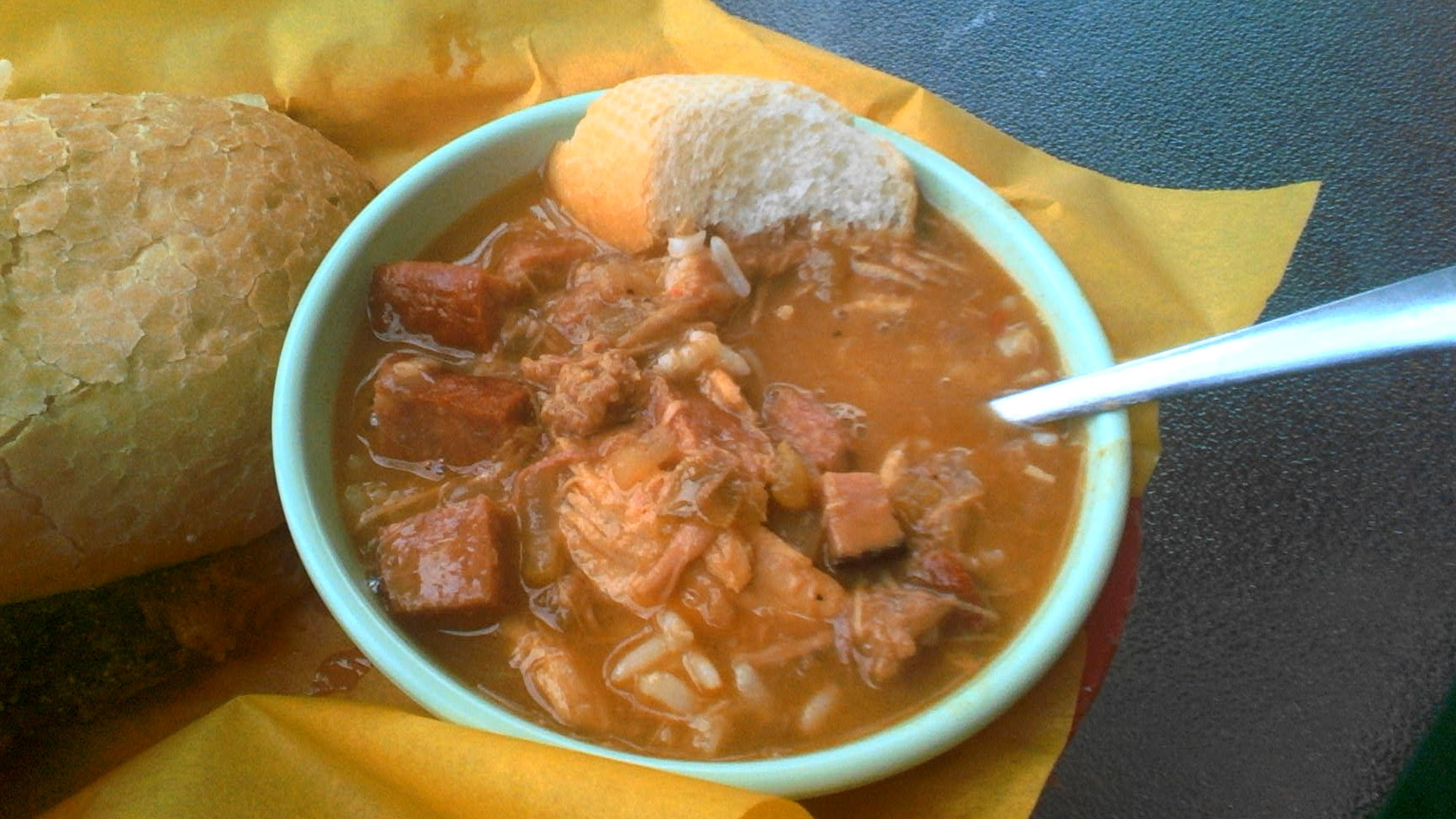
Gumbo

=== Cuisine ===
Louisiana cooking is more than just the piquant dishes of South Louisiana. It is primarily a product of the long-term fusion of various ethnic and cultural groups, such as the French (including their Acadian descendants/ Cajuns), Africans, and Spanish. This complex cultural blending produced distinctive regional food traditions. Cajun and Creole cooking are two famous styles of cooking in South Louisiana.

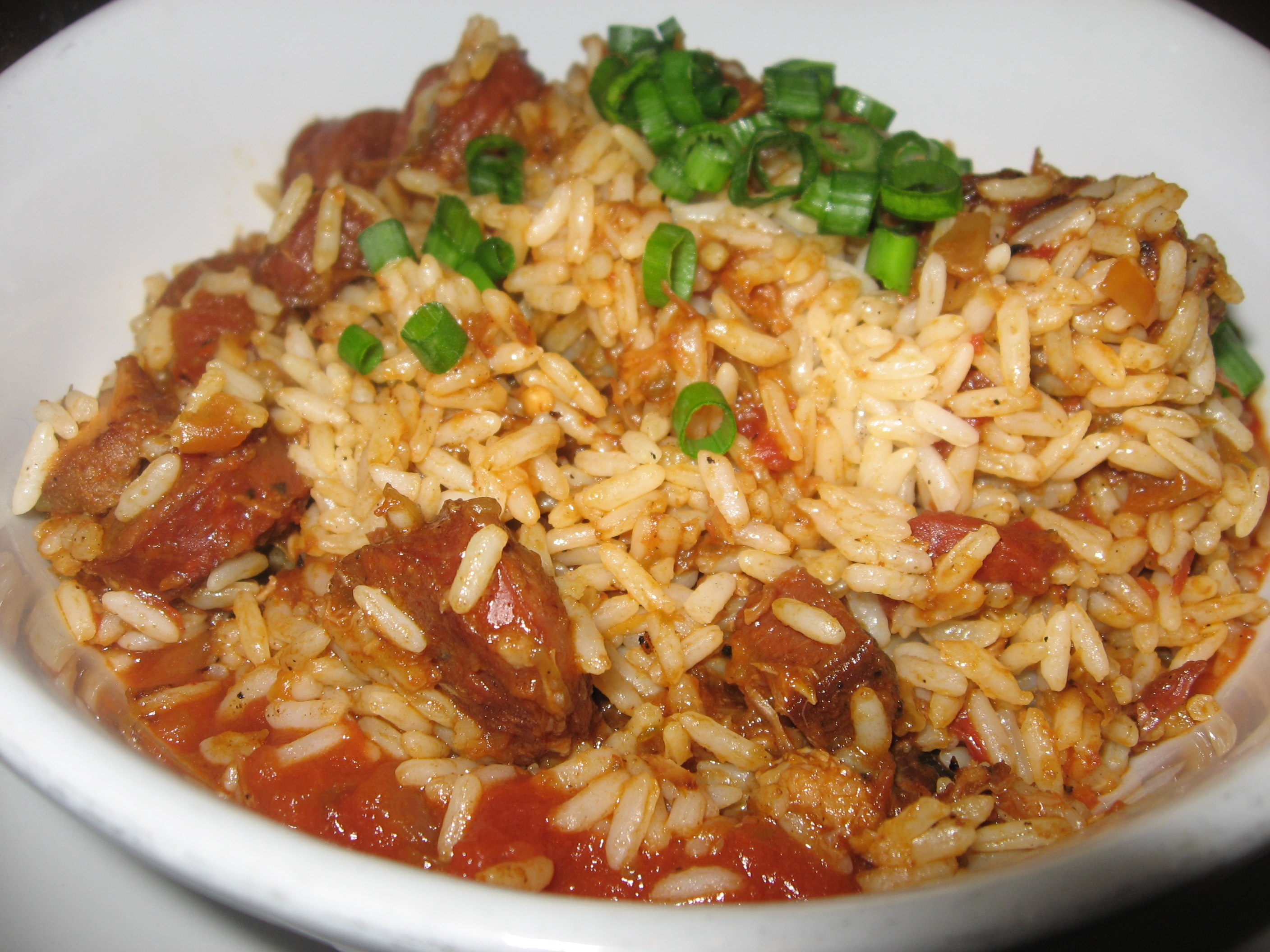
Jambalaya

Traditionally, Cajun cooking is associated with the rural prairies and bayou regions of south Louisiana, while Creole cooking is associated with New Orleans. Some people generalise this as "country food" (Cajun) and "city food" (Creole). Many representative dishes, such as Gumbo, Jambalaya, Crawfish Bisque, and Pralines, can be found on both menus.

Creole also often refers to the haute cuisine of New Orleans, with dishes greatly influenced by European-trained chefs. Cooking techniques and recipes are passed down through families across generations, often through oral tradition and observation. Traditional community activities, such as the Boucherie (hog-killing), are a way to maintain community ties and collective memory, where people jointly slaughter, prepare, and share every part of the pig.

Louisianians take pride in their cooking and enjoy showing off their skills. Louisiana’s cuisine has constantly been evolving, absorbing new influences. For example, crawfish went from being bait and "poor man's food" to popular boiled dishes. Developments in refrigeration and transportation allowed seafood consumption to expand inland. New immigrants continue to bring their food traditions into the Louisiana culinary landscape, integrating with local styles. For example, Vietnamese immigrants created "Viet-Cajun Crawfish" in Houston, combining Cajun boiled crawfish with Vietnamese flavours.

Other cuisines such as Italian, Asian, Middle Eastern, and Latin American are also welcomed and integrated locally. Families, communities, festivals (such as the Breaux Bridge Crawfish Festival and the Rayne Frog Festival), and institutions (such as the Southern Food and Beverage Museum and cooking schools) are actively maintaining and promoting Louisiana's food traditions.

=== Music ===
Louisiana Creole and Cajun music
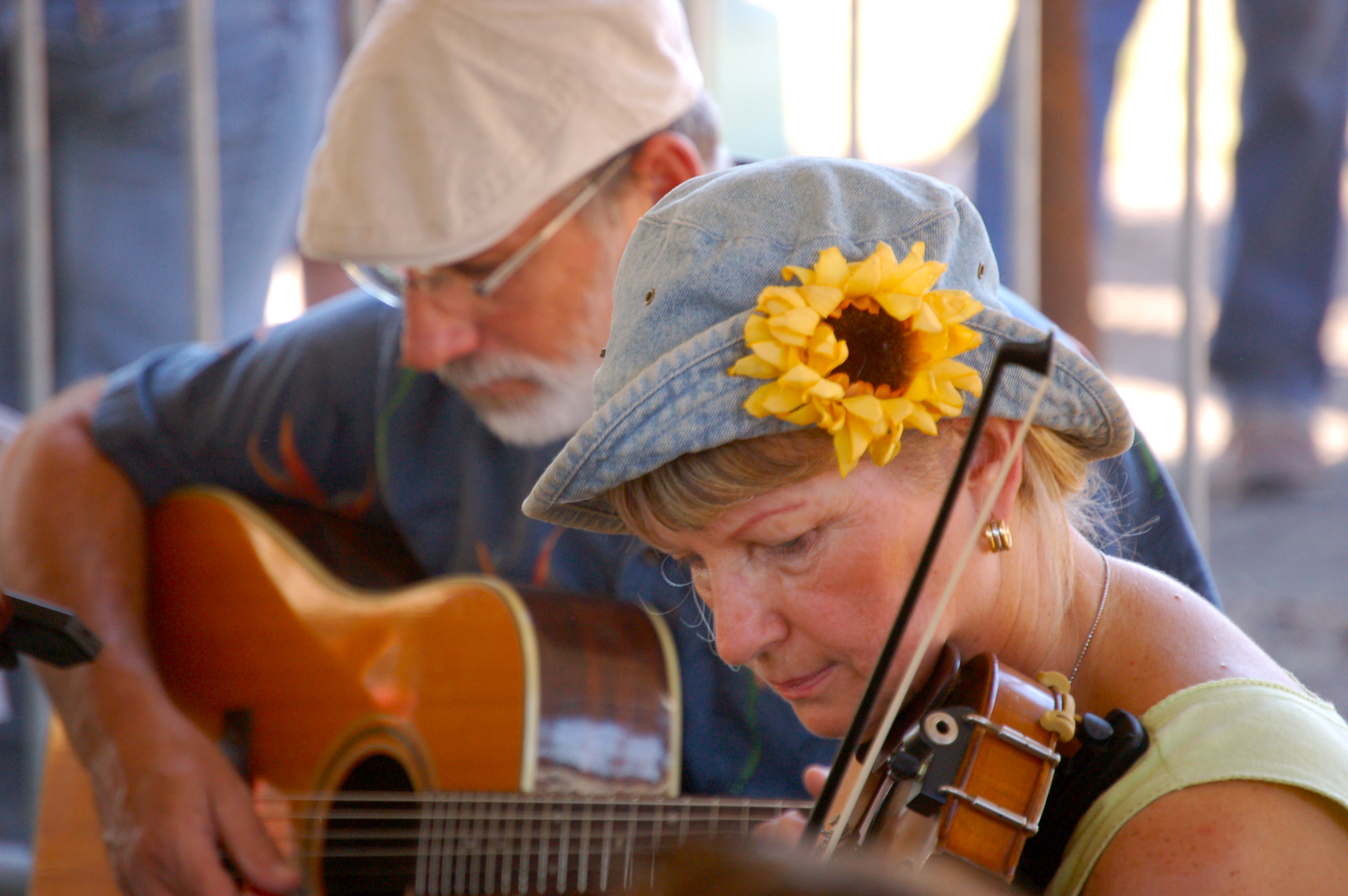
- Creole accordionist at Festivals Acadiens et Créoles, 2010
- Stylistic origins: African music, French folk music, Caribbean music, music of Spain
- Cultural origins: 18th century, French Louisiana (New Orleans, Acadiana)
- Typical instruments: Accordion, Fiddle, Triangle, Guitar, Horn section
- Derivative forms: Country music, Western swing, R&B, Rock and roll, Rap music

Subgenres
- Zydeco, Cajun music, Swamp pop

Regional scenes
- New Orleans, Lafayette, Ville Platte, Mamou

Creole folk songs originated from the enslaved Black population of Louisiana. These songs dealt with secular themes and were sung in a patois that reflected their grammatical syntax, instrumentation, musical style, and African heritage. Early in the history of the colony, shortly after the founding of New Orleans in 1718, slaves were permitted to gather for Sunday recreation in a plain on the edge of the city. Eventually the latter gathering place became known as Place Congo or Congo Square. There the blacks performed their dances and sang, accompanied by instruments made from whatever was at hand. Lullabies also have been handed down from the Creoles. Until this century the need to collect and preserve these songs was often not understood, but in the 1920s an effort was begun to include Cajun and Creole songs in American folk music. The people whose ancestors created the music are among those making an effort to preserve it.

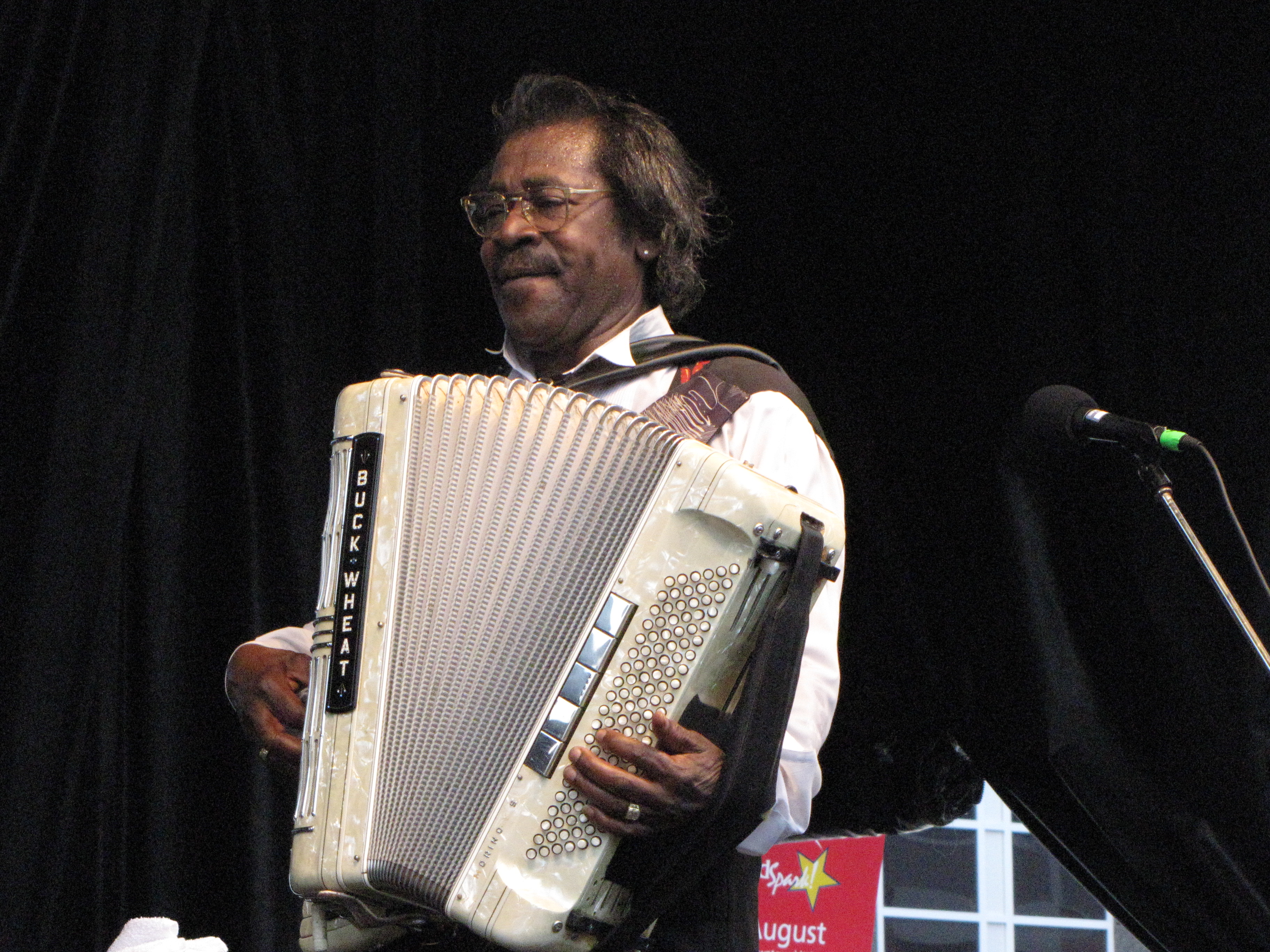
zydeco

Afro-French people also created a form of French music called zydeco. Both Cajun and zydeco music are intended for dancing, which shared background associated with bals de maison (house dances). Despite segregation, Creoles shared many songs with their Cajun neighbours, and the Cajun and Creole traditions have long borrowed from each other.

Music remains vibrant in modern French Louisiana culture and beyond. Traditional house dances and community dance clubs are important venues for music performance. Zydeco emerged from Black Creole dance music in rural areas of Louisiana and provides a way for musicians and dancers to fully articulate the deprivations of poverty with intelligence, artistry, and style.

These musics have been influenced by other music styles, such as Western swing, rock and roll, and country music, as well as blues and R&B, swamp-pop, reggae, rap and hip-hop.

Zydeco is also a hybrid. Zydeco players merge the past and present in a sound that still attracts young dancers. For example, Corey Ledet's album, Accordion Dragon, features unique band arrangements and includes lush, urbane horn arrangements that are rarely heard on zydeco waltzes but which work quite well. Beau Jocque mixed zydeco with classic rock and hip-hop, and Keith Frank has picked up Beau Jocque’s synthesis of zydeco and hip-hop.

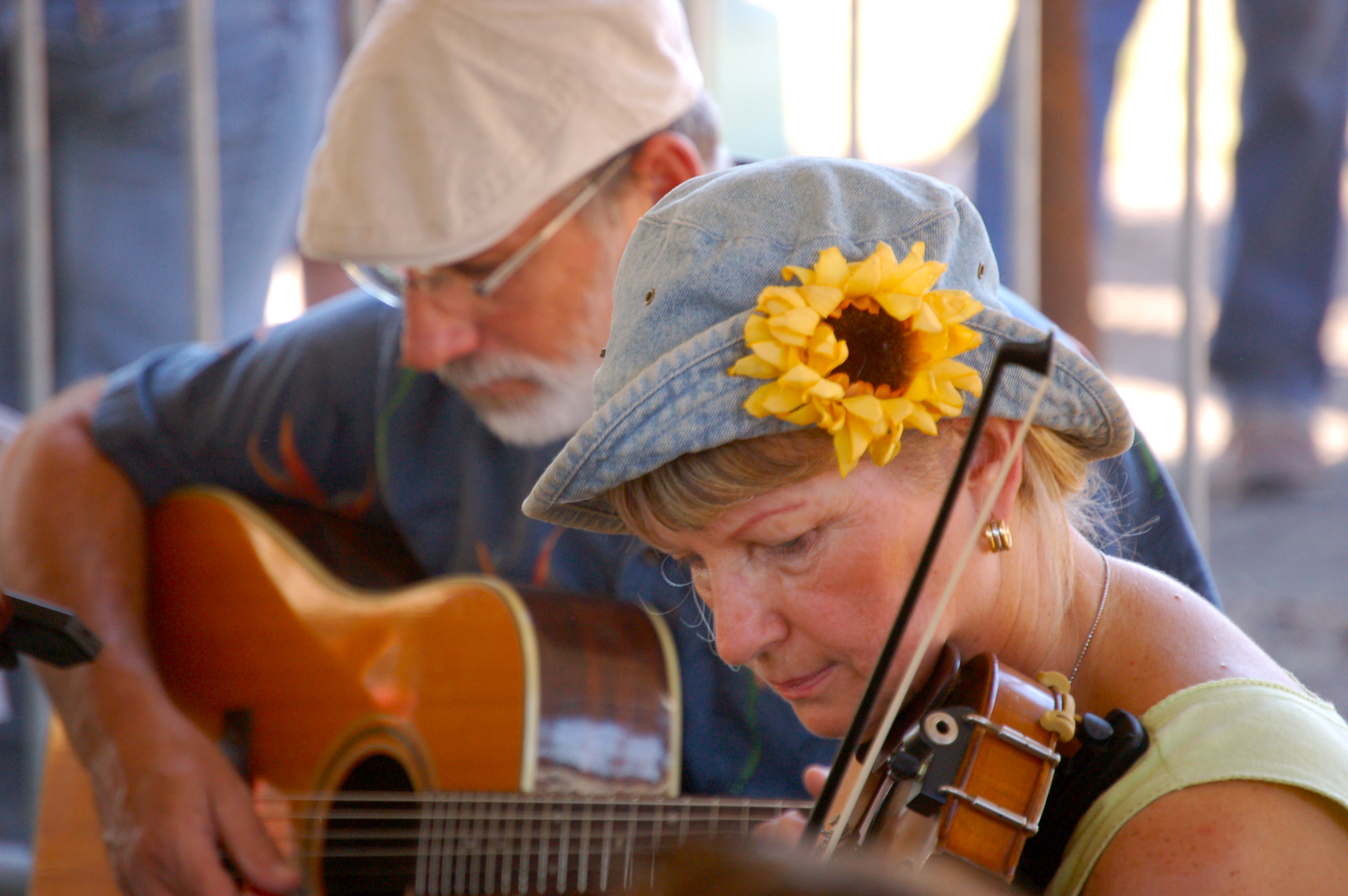
Festivals Acadiens et Créoles 2010 musicians

Black French music's listeners constitute a worldwide audience, and their distinctive sounds are part of an important ethnic music. Zydeco is heard at music clubs and festivals around the world. The visibility of zydeco increased in the 1980s when Queen Ida, Clifton Chenier, and Rockin’ Sidney each won Grammy awards. Rockin’ Sidney’s recording My Toot Toot became an international novelty hit, and movies such as The Big Easy introduced zydeco sounds to new audiences.

Festivals held in Ville Platte, Mamou, and New Orleans contribute to the perpetuation of this culture. Live Cajun music may be heard at local festivals like the annual Festivals Acadiens et Créoles or the Breaux Bridge Crawfish Festival. The “trail ride” culture associated with zydeco, where horseback riders take to the prairies on Sunday afternoons in a winding procession that culminates in an outdoor dance, represents a modern tradition.

Although the fluency in southwestern Louisiana’s vernacular French continues to decline, young Cajun songwriters continue to compose in French and add original songs to the repertoire. The number of jazz musicians who have recorded folk songs and other pieces in Creole shows the continuing use of the language by recent musicians.

== Cajun renaissance and identity ==
Since the rise of the Cajun Renaissance movement in the 1960s, Cajun culture and identity in Southern Louisiana have gained new attention and have been reshaped. This movement is not only a cultural revival but also accompanies an adjustment in the criteria for defining Cajun identity.

Cajun identity is a complex concept, not solely dependent on shared bloodlines and ancestry. It also encompasses shared cultural traditions, values, belief systems, and customs, as well as a strong sense of place. This identity is also largely constructed through differentiation from mainstream American culture. The Cajun community may have shifted from a "language community" primarily defined by a shared native language to one more focused on being a "cultural community" or even an “ideological community". For many young Cajuns, although they may no longer speak French fluently, French still holds a central place in their collective social and linguistic imaginary and is regarded as the "true" Acadian language. Using Cajun English, particularly in performative contexts such as telling jokes, has become an important way for the younger generation to construct and express their Cajun identity.

== See also ==
- Louisiana (New France)
- List of French possessions and colonies
