= Outward Bound (Sonny Landreth album) =

Studio album by Sonny Landreth
- Released: 1992
- Label: Zoo
- Producer: R.S. Field, Sonny Landreth

Sonny Landreth chronology
| Way Down in Louisiana (1985) | Outward Bound (1992) | South of I-10 (1995) |

Outward Bound is an album by the American musician Sonny Landreth, released in 1992. Landreth supported the album by playing the Montreal International Jazz Festival.

== Production ==
The album was produced by R.S. Field and Landreth. Landreth worked on Outward Bound for two years. Sue Medley contributed backing vocals to "Bad Weather". Members of the Goners, the backing band that worked on some of John Hiatt's albums and of which Landreth was a member, played on the album; Hiatt appeared on two songs. "Yokamoma" is an instrumental track. "New Landlord" is about an addiction to gambling.

== Critical reception ==
Professional ratings
Review scores
| Source | Rating |
|---|---|
| AllMusic | 3.5/5 stars |
| Chicago Tribune | 3/4 stars |
| The Encyclopedia of Popular Music | 4/5 stars |
| Entertainment Weekly | B |
| MusicHound Rock: The Essential Album Guide | 4/5 stars |

Entertainment Weekly praised Landreth's "snowflakes-in-the-swamp trail mix of bayou blues and Boulder boogie." Stereo Review noted that, "even when Landreth's voice is defeated by the melodrama or piety of his songs, he can always let his fingers do the talking." The Ottawa Citizen concluded that, "in the world of slide guitar players, Landreth belongs right up there with the late Duane Allman, Robert Johnson and Lowell George."

Rolling Stone noted that R.S. Field "has a knack for revitalizing traditional elements with a spark beyond musical nostalgia." The Orlando Sentinel thought that "Landreth isn't an outstanding lyricist, but his words have an appealing simplicity and frankness and his mild voice is well-suited to the material." The Washington Post said that "the revelation comes in hearing all of the crafty and evocative tunes Landreth has composed for the album and how they tailor-fit his light, tuneful tenor voice." The Colorado Springs Gazette-Telegraph listed the album as the 11th best of 1992. The Milwaukee Sentinel listed Outward Bound among the 25 best albums of 1992.

AllMusic wrote that "Landreth's playing sizzles and slashes... There's lots of space where what isn't played is just as important as what is."

== Track listing ==
| No. | Title | Length |
|---|---|---|
| 1. | "Soldier of Fortune" |
| 2. | "Back to Bayou Têche" |
| 3. | "When You're Away" |
| 4. | "Sacred Ground" |
| 5. | "New Landlord" |
| 6. | "Speak of the Devil" |
| 7. | "Yokamoma" |
| 8. | "Planet Cannonball" |
| 9. | "Common Law Love" |
| 10. | "Bad Weather" |
| 11. | "Outward Bound" |
