= A Night in London =

Video by Mark Knopfler
- Released: 1996
- Recorded: BBC Building, London, 15 April 1996
- Length: 94 minutes
- Label: Mercury

Mark Knopfler chronology
A Night in London (1996)	Real Live Roadrunning (2006)

A Night in London is a live concert video by Mark Knopfler released on VHS tape and Laserdisc in 1996 by PolyGram Music and on DVD in 2003 by Universal Music. The setlist includes songs from Knopfler's first solo album, Golden Heart, along with well-known Dire Straits numbers and film themes composed by the artist. It was officially released to YouTube in April 2024.

== Track listing ==
1. "Darling Pretty" – 5:39
2. "Walk of Life" – 5:21
3. "Imelda" – 5:50
4. "Father and Son" – 3:23
5. "Golden Heart" – 4:53
6. "Rüdiger" – 7:17
7. "Cannibals" – 7:07
8. "Je Suis Désolé" – 7:23
9. "Last Exit to Brooklyn" – 2:16
10. "Romeo and Juliet" – 7:49
11. "Done with Bonaparte" – 5:08
12. "A Night in Summer Long Ago" – 5:46
13. "Brothers in Arms" – 8:30
14. "Going Home" – 5:02
15. "Are We in Trouble Now" – 6:03
16. "Gravy Train" – 7:15 (Note: "Sultans of Swing" and "Money for Nothing" were included in the VHS/Laserdisc version)

== Personnel ==
- Mark Knopfler – vocals, guitar
- Richard Bennett – guitar
- Guy Fletcher – keyboards, backing vocals, acoustic guitar
- Jim Cox – keyboards, backing vocals
- Glenn Worf – bass guitar, upright bass, backing vocals
- Chad Cromwell – drums
- Paul Franklin – pedal steel guitar
- Sonny Landreth – guitar
- Jools Holland – piano, organ
- Dónal Lunny – bouzouki
- Liam O'Flynn – uilleann pipes
- Seán Keane – violin
- Máirtín O'Connor – accordion
- Sonia Slany – violin
- Jules Singleton – violin
- Jocelyn Pook – viola
- Dinah Beamish – cello
