= Lost & Profound =

Canadian music group

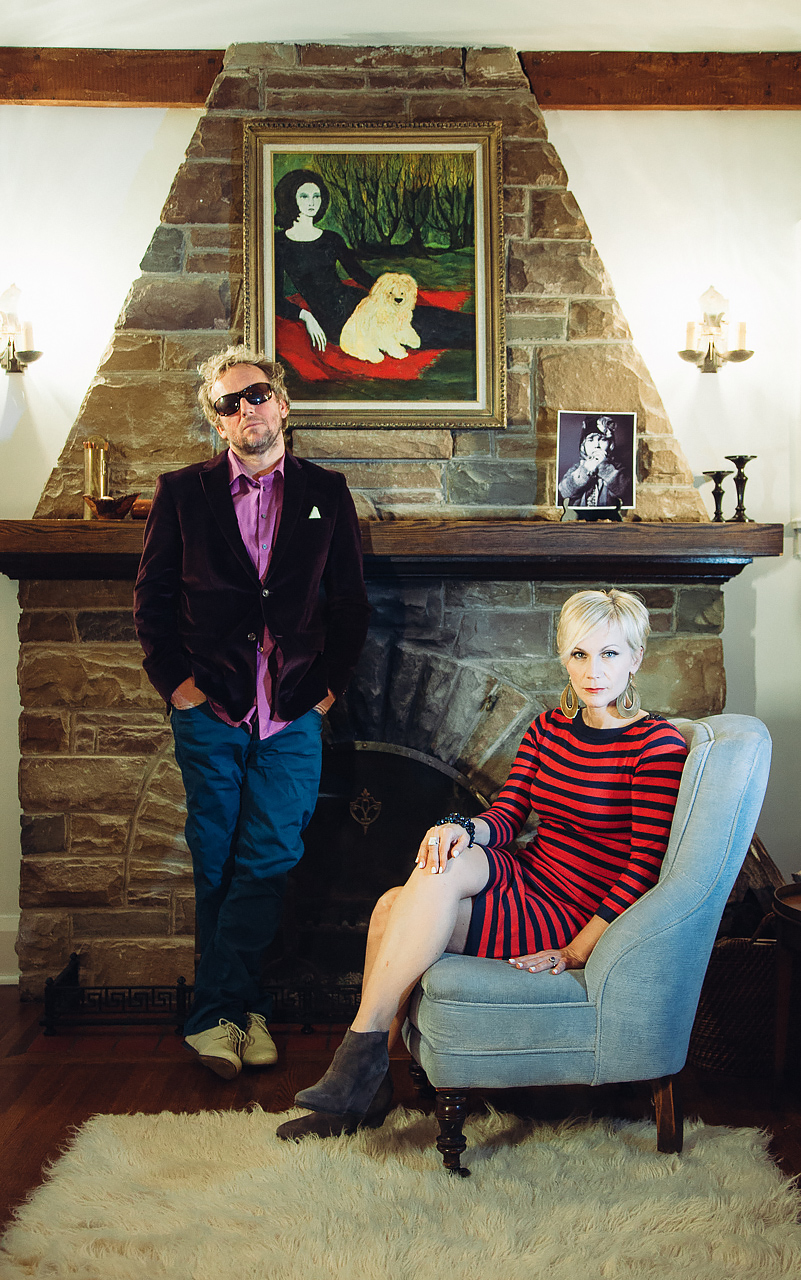

Background information
- Origin: Toronto, Ontario, Canada
- Genre: Alternative
- Members: Lisa Boudreau; Terry Tompkins
- Website: lostandprofound.ca

Lost & Profound is a Canadian folk rock band that originated in the early 1990s. They are known for their moody, low-key folk songs.

== History ==
Originally from Calgary, Alberta, the group began performing under the name The Psychedelic Folk Virgins. The band consisted of vocalist Lisa Boudreau and guitarist Terry Tompkins, with a varying roster of supporting musicians that included Anton Evans on bass, Vic D'Arsie on keyboards, and Curtis Driedger, Allen Baekeland, and David Quinton-Steinberg on drums.

After moving to Toronto in 1985, the band released the independent cassette The Bottled Romance of Nowhere and signed a recording contract with A&R's PolyGram Records.

Boudreau and Tompkins, a married couple, signed as Lost & Profound to PolyGram in 1992, and released their self-titled debut produced by Richard Bennett. The album included a Top 20 hit single "Brand New Set of Lies". Other singles from the album included "Curb the Angels" and "Winter Raging". They garnered a Juno Award nomination for Most Promising Group at the 1993 Juno Awards.

The band followed up with Memory Thief released on PolyGram Records in 1994, which spawned the singles "Miracles Happen" and "Invitation". Memory Thief was also produced by Richard Bennett and featured musicians Jamie Stewart (bass), Kenny Greenberg (guitar), and Michael Organ (drums). Boudreau and Tompkins recorded a faithful recreation of "Some Velvet Morning", the 1967 psychedelic duet by Nancy Sinatra and Lee Hazlewood for inclusion on Memory Thief. Producer Bennett brought in arranger Billy Strange to conduct his original orchestral score from the 1967 Sinatra/Hazlewood session.

Love's Sweet Messenger was released independently in 1996. Boudreau and Tompkins subsequently pursued different directions.

After a prolonged break, Boudreau and Tompkins reunited as Lost & Profound in 2015, co-producing and releasing a new album Goodbye Mine.

== Discography ==
=== The Psychedelic Folk Virgins ===
- 1989: The Bottled Romance of Nowhere
- 1990: The Psychedelic Folk Virgins

=== Lost & Profound ===
- 1992: Lost & Profound (Polydor/PolyGram) 5132512
- 1994: Memory Thief (Polydor/PolyGram) 5195182
- 1996: Love's Sweet Messenger (Lost Weekend Records)
- 2015: Goodbye Mine (Drunk Boat Records)

=== Red Suede Red ===
- 2002: Red Suede Red
