= American Routes =

American radio program

- Running time: 2 hours
- Country of origin: United States
- Language: English
- Home station: WWNO
- Syndicates: PRX
- Hosted by: Nick Spitzer
- Executive producer: Mary Beth Kirchner
- Recording studio: New Orleans, Louisiana
- Original release: 1998 – present
- Audio format: Stereophonic
- Website: https://www.wwno.org/show/american-routes

American Routes is a weekly two-hour public radio program that presents the breadth and depth of the American musical and cultural landscape. Hosted by Nick Spitzer, American Routes is syndicated by 225 stations, with over half a million listeners. It is produced out of New Orleans and distributed by PRX. American Routes is the most widely heard regular presence for tradition-derived and community-based music on public radio today.

== History ==
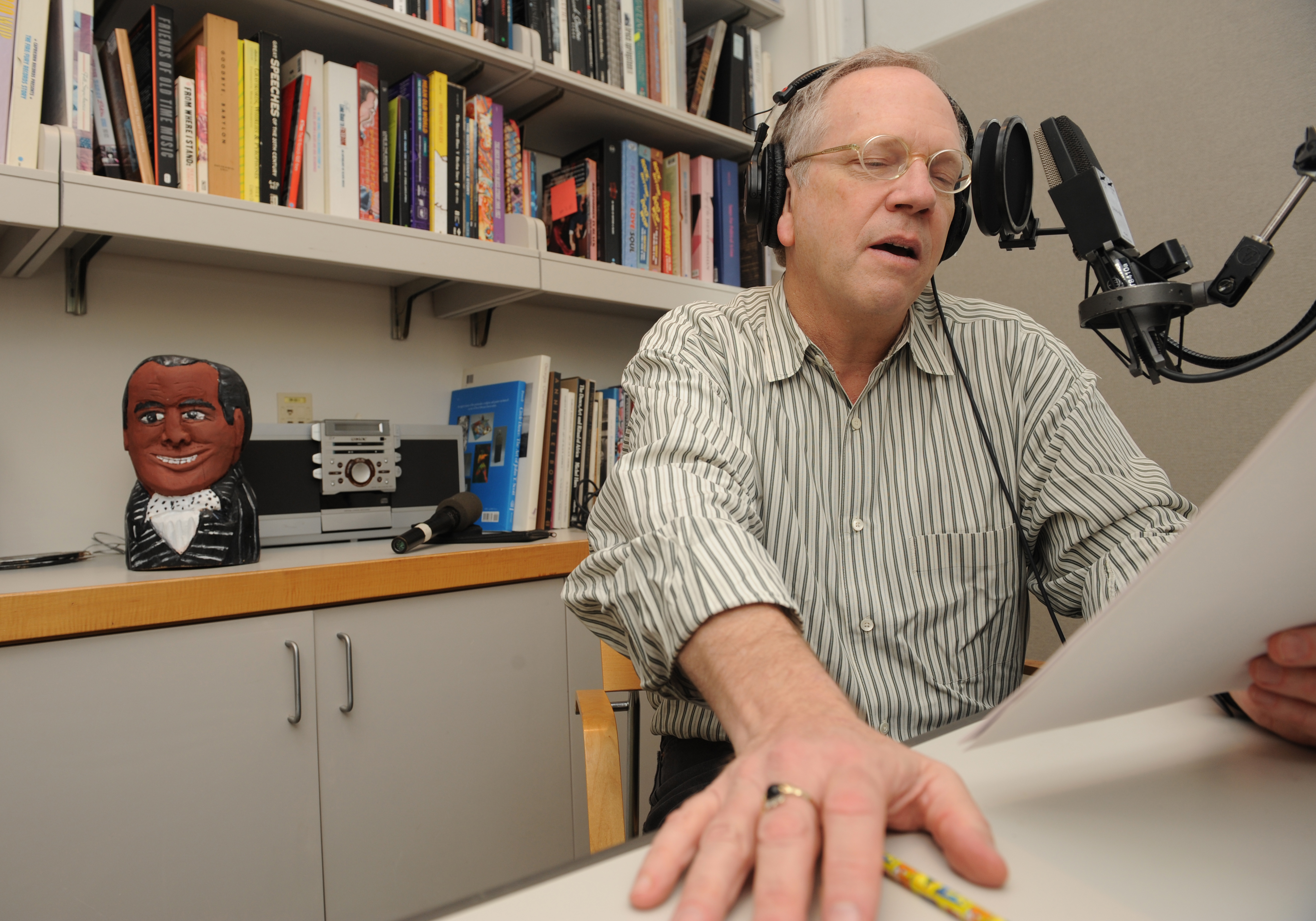
Spitzer at the microphone in 2009

The show was launched in November 1997 on WWOZ in New Orleans. It was created by Nick Spitzer and Mary Beth Kirchner, who had worked together previously producing segments for All Things Considered. By 1998, American Routes was syndicated by American Public Radio for 39 stations.

In the wake of Hurricane Katrina, production of the show temporarily relocated to KRVS 88.7 FM at the University of Louisiana at Lafayette in Lafayette, Louisiana. While in Lafayette, Spitzer and his crew produced a series of shows called After the Storm, which "followed the rebuilding of the Gulf Coast through the stories and songs of its musicians".

Production operations have since returned to New Orleans with studios at Tulane University. In July 2008, American Routes announced an affiliation with Tulane.

American Routes celebrated its 10th anniversary on January 16, 2009, with a concert at the House of Blues in New Orleans. Performers included Dr. Michael White, Trombone Shorty and Al Johnson. Performances and interviews from the show were included in a program that aired the week of February 18, 2009.

American Routes has more than 300 original shows in its catalog, and a database of over 1000 hours of interviews.

As of July 2011, the program switched distributors from APM to the Public Radio Exchange, although it continued to be distributed on the public radio satellite system. It was the second major public radio series to switch to the web-based distributor from one of the "Big 3" public radio distributors, after Sound Opinions switched from APM the prior year.

== Format ==
Every American Routes show is two hours long. The show consists of songs arranged around interviews, usually of musicians or field audio from various cultural events or institutions. The music is chosen to complement the theme of the show. You can find archived radio shows featuring playlists of specific artists and styles to choose from, streaming 24/7 at American Routes

== Interviews ==
Notable interviews featured on American Routes include:

- Joan Baez
- Chuck Berry
- Ray Charles
- Dr John
- Al Green
- Buddy Guy
- Herbie Hancock
- Jim Jarmusch
- Norah Jones
- Spike Lee
- Jerry Lee Lewis
- Taj Mahal
- Hugh Masekela
- Willie Nelson
- Dolly Parton
- Bonnie Raitt
- Anne Rice
- Sonny Rollins
- Pete Seeger
- Allen Toussaint
- Porter Wagoner
- Tom Waits
- Wilco
- Brian Wilson

== Staff ==
As of April 2018:

- Nick Spitzer – Host and Producer
- Mary Beth Kirchner – Founding Executive Producer
- Betsy Shepherd – Managing Producer & Editor
- Garrett Pittman – Associate Producer
- Olivia Broslawsky – Assistant Producer
- Jason Rhein – Technical Supervisor
- Lauren Callihan — Development Associate

== CD releases ==
- American Routes with Nick Spitzer: Songs and Stories from the Road [2 CD] (2008, Highbridge Company)
- Our New Orleans: A Benefit Album [CD] (2005, Nonesuch Records)
