= Marce LaCouture =

American folk musician

Marce Lacouture is an American folk music and cajun recording artist and songwriter.

Lacouture grew up in Texas and Louisiana.

She began singing professionally in Austin folk and rock bands and in 1984 formed a duo with Butch Hancock, with whom she recorded two albums. She has spent many years in Louisiana exploring the Cajun heritage, which led her to a long apprenticeship with traditional Louisiana French ballad singers Lula Landry and Inez Catalon, honored on her CD La Joie Cadienne.

One of her songs, "So I'll Run" is featured in the book 31 Songs by British author Nick Hornby, telling about songs and the particular emotional resonance they carry for him. Hornby had heard LaCouture playing in a bar in north London.

On June 23, 2010, LaCouture performed in the Homegrown Concert Series at the Library of Congress.

== Discography ==
The Nouveau String Band with Marce Lacouture Nouveau String Band (2006)

As Marce Lacouture La Joie Cadienne, Cut Up Records (2004, originally released in 2000)

Rue La-La Sky on Blue, Riverwheel Records (2000)

With Butch Hancock Cause of the Cactus, Rainlight Records (1986, released on cassette only)

With Butch Hancock Yella Rose, Rainlight Records (1985, previously released on vinyl)

== Compilations ==
- Medicine Show Vols. 3 & 4 (2004)
- Louisiana Crossroads – Acadiana Arts Council (2002)
- Maritimes des Terres francaise d' Amerique Le Chasse-Marée/Armen-Radio – Canada-chaîne culturelle (2001)
- Putumayo Presents Cajun – Putumayo World Records (2001)
- Kerrville Folk Festival – Kerrville Folk Foundation (1988)
- Live at the Continental Club – (1986)
- Kerrville Folk Festival Compilation – Kerrville Folk Foundation (1986)

Also several guest sessions with Sonny Landreth, John Dubois, and Bill Oliver
