= You Still Got Me (Beth Hart album) =

Studio album by Beth Hart
- Released: October 25, 2024
- Recorded: Nashville, Tennessee
- Length: 49:45
- Labels: Provogue; Mascot
- Producer: Kevin Shirley

Beth Hart chronology
A Tribute to Led Zeppelin (2022)	You Still Got Me (2024)

Singles from You Still Got Me
- 1. "Little Heartbreak Girl" Released: March 22, 2024; 2. "You Still Got Me" Released: June 28, 2024; 3. "Wonderful World" Released: August 23, 2024

Professional ratings
Review scores
Source	Rating
Classic Rock	4/5 stars
laut.de	4/5 stars

You Still Got Me is the eleventh solo studio album by American singer-songwriter Beth Hart. It was released on October 25, 2024, through Provogue Records and Mascot Label Group. It marks her first studio release of original material in five years, following War in My Mind (2019). Produced by Kevin Shirley, it features contributions from Slash and Eric Gales.

== Background and singles ==
The project is intended to further showcase the singer's "raw vocal power and emotional depth" and continue her streak as one of the "most compelling voices" in contemporary blues and rock. Hart described the creation of You Still Got Me as always for the "joy" or "challenge of writing", saying that she seeks out the piano whenever she is "sad or scared" to find comfort in it, whether "a song comes" or not. The album was first teased by the release of "Little Heartbreak Girl" on March 22, 2024, previously a "fan favorite ballad", that stems from a period of mental health challenges for Hart. The eponymous single, produced by Kevin Shirley and recorded in Nashville, Tennessee, was released on June 28 and demonstrates the singer's ability to be a "source of inspiration" by tearing "her emotions" apart and reminding the listeners of its inner strength. She shared the third single "Wonderful World", a "piano-led ballad", on August 23.

The album is set to be supported by a UK and European tour in early 2025, following separate dates in North America, the UK and Europe in late 2025.

== Reception ==
M. K. Bennett of Louder Than War stated: "Everything here rightfully revolves around the voice, that huge room-filling lung collapsing sound she makes, from a whisper to a scream, a murmur to a sigh. At this point in her career, her talent is not in dispute, so we judge the songs within the context of the voice and see what beauty we might find in the details." Colin Palmer of Buzz Magazine wrote: "Beth Hart once again proves she’s a soulful blues survivor, allowing the listener to live inside the sound of her voice and to feel vicariously through her glorious proclamations."

== Track listing ==
All tracks are written by Beth Hart, except where noted.

You Still Got Me track listing
No.	Title	Writer(s)	Length
1.	"Savior with a Razor" (featuring Slash)	Beth Hart; Rune Westberg	4:47
2.	"Suga N My Bowl" (featuring Eric Gales)	Hart; Westberg	3:33
3.	"Never Underestimate a Gal"		3:07
4.	"Drunk on Valentine"		5:22
5.	"Wanna Be Big Bad Johnny Cash"	Hart; Glen Burtnik	3:21
6.	"Wonderful World"	Hart; Westberg	4:39
7.	"Little Heartbreak Girl"		4:18
8.	"Don't Call the Police"		6:30
9.	"You Still Got Me"		6:01
10.	"Pimp Like That"		4:52
11.	"Machine Gun Vibrato"		3:15
Total length:			49:45

== Charts ==
Chart performance for You Still Got Me
Chart (2024)	Peak position
Austrian Albums (Ö3 Austria)	5
Belgian Albums (Ultratop Flanders)	91
Belgian Albums (Ultratop Wallonia)	64
Dutch Albums (Album Top 100)	4
French Albums (SNEP)	84
German Albums (Offizielle Top 100)	7
Polish Albums (ZPAV)	26
Scottish Albums (Official Charts)	22
Swedish Physical Albums (Sverigetopplistan)	13
Swiss Albums (Schweizer Hitparade)	6
UK Albums Sales (OCC)	23
UK Americana Albums (Official Charts)	2
UK Independent Albums (Official Charts)	10
UK Jazz & Blues Albums (Official Charts)	1
