= Live at the Royal Albert Hall (Beth Hart video) =

Video by Beth Hart
- Released: 30 November 2018
- Recorded: 4 May 2018
- Venue: Royal Albert Hall
- Genre: Rock, jazz, blues, soul
- Length: 2:02:33
- Label: Provogue / Mascot Label
- Director: Nigel Dick
- Producer: Ed Van Zijl (executive producer), David Wolff (executive producer), Malcolm Walker (supervising producer), Jeremy Azis

Beth Hart chronology
| Live in Amsterdam (2014) | Live at the Royal Albert Hall (2018) |

Live at the Royal Albert Hall is a concert recording by American singer-songwriter Beth Hart, recorded in the Royal Albert Hall on 4 May 2018, and released six months after her New York concert album on 30 November 2018 by Provogue in video format as Blu-ray, DVD and digital, and as a live music album on two CDs, three LPs, and as digital. Hart's performance, from belted out songs to intimate piano performance that reduced the 5000 seat venue to the feel of an intimate club, took the audience on a journey of many of her best songs and showcasing her journey through life. Hart dedicated the song "Close to My Fire" to her mother, who was one of the audience members of this concert. As well as putting on a musical tour-de-force, Hart opened up about her life and spun out intimate, off-the-cuff stories as she moved through her set.

== Track listing ==
Live at Royal Albert Hall Show

| No. | Title | Writer(s) | Length |
|---|---|---|---|
| 0. | "When You Need Somebody (Video intro, song by Davy Watson)" | | 0:42 |
| 1. | "As Long As I Have a Song" | Beth Hart | 2:39 |
| 2. | "For My Friends" | Bill Withers | 4:23 |
| 3. | "Lifts You Up" | Hart, Gregg Sutton, Bob Thiele | 3:51 |
| 4. | "Close to My Fire" | Stephanie Popp, Peter Hoppe | 5:29 |
| 5. | "Bang Bang Boom Boom" | Hart, Rune Westberg | 4:27 |
| 6. | "Good As It Gets" | Hart | 4:40 |
| 7. | "Spirit of God" | Hart | 5:05 |
| 8. | "Baddest Blues" | Hart | 6:00 |
| 9. | "Sister Heroine" | Hart, Westberg | 7:03 |
| 10. | "Baby Shot Me Down" | Hart | 3:31 |
| 11. | "Waterfalls" | Hart, Jon Nichols, Tom Lilly, Todd Wolf | 5:39 |
| 12. | "Your Heart Is As Black As Night" | Melody Gardot | 6:33 |
| 13. | "Saved" | Jerry Leiber, Mike Stoller | 4:29 |
| 14. | "The Ugliest House on the Block" | Hart | 5:54 |
| 15. | "Spiders in My Bed" | Hart | 4:59 |
| 16. | "Take It Easy on Me" | Hart, Westberg | 6:32 |
| 17. | "Leave the Light On" | Hart, Oliver Leiber | 5:59 |
| 18. | "Mama This One's For You" | Hart | 4:10 |
| 19. | "My California" | Hart, Westberg | 6:22 |
| 20. | "Trouble" | Hart | 5:31 |
| 21. | "Love Is a Lie" | Hart | 3:21 |
| 22. | "Picture in a Frame" | Hart | 4:44 |
| 23. | "Caught Out in the Rain" | Hart, James House | 9:43 |
| 24. | "Credits" | | 0:47 |
| Total length: | | | 2:02:33 |

Extras

| No. | Title | Length |
|---|---|---|
| 1. | "Behind the Scenes" | 3:21 |
| 2. | "Interview with Beth Hart" | 29:04 |

== Personnel ==
Musicians

- Beth Hart – vocals, piano, acoustic guitar, acoustic bass
- Jon Nichols – electric guitar, acoustic guitar, backing vocals
- Bill Ransom – drums, percussion
- Bob Marinelli – bass

Production

- Ed Van Zijl – executive producer
- David Wolff – executive producer
- Malcolm Walker – supervising producer
- Jeremy Azis – producer
- Nigel Dick – director
- Eugene O'Connor – director of photography
- Eddie Acket – editor
- Mike Wood – on-line editor
- James Thorn – assistant editor
- Jack Sowerby – engineer
- Mark Hornsby – recording engineer (RAH), audio edit, mixing
- Will Shapland – recording engineer (RAH)
- Nathan Heironimus – additional engineering
- Shawn Dealey – audio edit, mixing
- Ken Love – mastering (Sweetwater Studios in Fort Wayne, Indiana, US)
- Chris Goddard – audio engineer
- Mark Roundtree – audio assistant
- Lucas Uscila-Dainavicius – audio assistant
- Sebastian Nacca – mon sound engineer
- Jasoh Phair – foh sound engineer
- Roy Koch – artwork
- Willem Heijnen – artwork

Live at the Royal Albert Hall

Live album by Beth Hart
- Released: 30 November 2018
- Recorded: 4 May 2018
- Venue: Royal Albert Hall
- Genre: Rock, jazz, blues, soul
- Length: 2:00:52
- Label: Provogue / Mascot Label
- Producer: Ed Van Zijl (executive producer), David Wolff (executive producer), Malcolm Walker (supervising producer), Jeremy Azis

Beth Hart chronology
| Front and Center – Live from New York (2018) | Live at the Royal Albert Hall (2018) | War in My Mind (2019) |

Professional ratings
Review scores
| Source | Rating |
|---|---|
| American Songwriter | 4/5 stars |
| Music-News.com | 4/5 stars |

== Album ==
=== Track listing ===
CD 1

| No. | Title | Writer(s) | Length |
|---|---|---|---|
| 1. | "As Long As I Have a Song" | Beth Hart | 2:42 |
| 2. | "For My Friends" | Bill Withers | 4:20 |
| 3. | "Lifts You Up" | Hart, Gregg Sutton, Bob Thiele | 3:56 |
| 4. | "Close to My Fire" | Stephanie Popp, Peter Hoppe | 5:29 |
| 5. | "Bang Bang Boom Boom" | Hart, Rune Westberg | 4:26 |
| 6. | "Good As It Gets" | Hart | 4:40 |
| 7. | "Spirit of God" | Hart | 5:04 |
| 8. | "Baddest Blues" | Hart | 6:01 |
| 9. | "Sister Heroine" | Hart, Westberg | 7:00 |
| 10. | "Baby Shot Me Down" | Hart | 3:32 |
| 11. | "Waterfalls" | Hart, Jon Nichols, Tom Lilly, Todd Wolf | 5:39 |
| 12. | "Your Heart Is As Black As Night" | Melody Gardot | 6:09 |
| Total length: | | | 58:58 |

CD 2

| No. | Title | Writer(s) | Length |
|---|---|---|---|
| 1. | "Saved" | Jerry Leiber, Mike Stoller | 4:30 |
| 2. | "The Ugliest House on the Block" | Hart | 5:54 |
| 3. | "Spiders in My Bed" | Hart | 4:57 |
| 4. | "Take It Easy on Me" | Hart, Westberg | 6:32 |
| 5. | "Leave the Light On" | Hart, Oliver Leiber | 5:58 |
| 6. | "Mama This One's For You" | Hart | 4:11 |
| 7. | "My California" | Hart, Westberg | 6:21 |
| 8. | "Trouble" | Hart | 5:31 |
| 9. | "Love Is a Lie" | Hart | 3:21 |
| 10. | "Picture in a Frame" | Hart | 4:43 |
| 11. | "Caught Out in the Rain" | Hart, James House | 9:56 |
| Total length: | | | 1:01:54 |

=== Personnel ===
Musicians

- Beth Hart – vocals, piano, acoustic guitar, acoustic bass
- Jon Nichols – electric guitar, acoustic guitar, backing vocals
- Bill Ransom – drums, percussion
- Bob Marinelli – bass

Production

- Ed Van Zijl – executive producer
- David Wolff – executive producer
- Malcolm Walker – supervising producer
- Jeremy Azis – producer
- Mark Hornsby – recording engineer (RAH), audio edit, mixing
- Will Shapland – recording engineer (RAH)
- Shawn Dealey – audio edit, mixing
- Ken Love – mastering (Sweetwater Studios in Fort Wayne, Indiana, US)
- Chris Goddard – audio engineer
- Mark Roundtree – audio assistant
- Lucas Uscila-Dainavicius – audio assistant
- Sebastian Nacca – mon sound engineer
- Jasoh Phair – foh sound engineer
- Roy Koch – artwork
- Willem Heijnen – artwork
