= Golden Heart =

Studio album by Mark Knopfler
- Released: 25 March 1996
- Recorded: 1994–1996
- Studio: Emerald Sound Studios, Javelina Recording Studios, AIR Studios, Windmill Lane Studios
- Genre: Roots rock, folk rock, country
- Length: 70:18
- Label: Vertigo; Warner Bros. (USA)
- Producer: Mark Knopfler, Chuck Ainlay

Mark Knopfler chronology
Screenplaying (1993)	Golden Heart (1996)	Wag the Dog (1998)

Golden Heart is the debut solo studio album by British singer-songwriter and guitarist Mark Knopfler, released on 25 March 1996 by Vertigo Records internationally and Warner Bros. Records in the United States. Following a successful career leading British rock band Dire Straits and composing a string of critically acclaimed film soundtrack albums, Knopfler recorded his first solo album, drawing upon the various musical influences he had engaged since emerging as a major recording artist in 1978. The album reached the top-10 position on charts in Austria, Belgium, Finland, Italy, the Netherlands, Norway, Sweden, Switzerland and the United Kingdom. The album peaked at 105 on the Billboard 200 in the United States.

== Background ==
Following the release of Dire Straits' final studio album, On Every Street, and a grueling 15-month world tour of Europe, North America and Australia—a tour seen by 7.1 million people that ended in October 1992—Knopfler quietly dissolved the popular British rock band that had become one of the world's most commercially successful bands, with worldwide album sales of more than 120 million. He would later recall, "I put the thing to bed because I wanted to get back to some kind of reality. It's self-protection, a survival thing. That kind of scale is dehumanizing." He spent two years recovering from the experience, which had taken a toll on his creative and personal lives. In 1994, he began work on what would become his first solo album.

== Singles ==
=== "Darling Pretty" ===
Darling Pretty

"Darling Pretty" is the first single from the album. It reached number 33 in the UK Singles Chart, and was featured in the 1996 film Twister. "Gravy Train", the second track on the maxi-single, was featured in the 2001 film America's Sweethearts.

==== Track listing ====
All tracks are written by Mark Knopfler.

No.	Title	Length
1.	"Darling Pretty"	4:27
2.	"Gravy Train"	6:19
3.	"My Claim to Fame"	4:39
Total length:		15:25

==== Weekly charts ====
Chart (1996)	Peak position
Italy Airplay (Music & Media)	7

=== "Cannibals" ===
Cannibals

"Cannibals" is the second single from the album. It is very similar in sound and structure to the Dire Straits hit single "Walk of Life", also written by Knopfler. "Cannibals" is taken from the album. "Tall Order Baby" and "What Have I Got to Do" are outtakes from the album. The song was the concert opener for the Kill to Get Crimson Tour in 2008.

==== Track listing ====
All tracks are written by Mark Knopfler.

No.	Title	Length
1.	"Cannibals"	3:38
2.	"Tall Order Baby"	2:53
3.	"What Have I Got To Do"	5:20
Total length:		11:51

=== "Rüdiger" ===
Rudiger single cover

"Rüdiger" is the third and final single from the album. "Rüdiger" is taken from the album. Rudiger was used on the soundtrack for the film The Bandits. "My Claim to Fame", "Tall Order Baby", and "What Have I Got to Do" are outtakes from the album.

==== Track listing ====
All tracks are written by Mark Knopfler.

No.	Title	Length
1.	"Rüdiger"	5:59
2.	"My Claim to Fame"	4:39
3.	"Tall Order Baby"	2:53
4.	"What Have I Got to Do"	5:20
Total length:		18:51

== Touring ==
Knopfler supported the release of Golden Heart with the Golden Heart Tour of Europe, which started on 24 April 1996 in Galway, Ireland, and included 84 concerts in 66 cities, ending in Antibes, France, on 4 August 1996. One of the early shows was recorded on video and was released as a DVD titled A Night in London. The tour lineup included Mark Knopfler (guitar, vocals), Guy Fletcher (keyboards), Richard Bennett (guitar), Glenn Worf (bass), Chad Cromwell (drums) and Jim Cox (keyboards). This initial touring group later became known to Knopfler fans as the 96-ers. A preview performance with an expanded lineup of players was given on 15 April 1996 at the BBC Building in London. This show was recorded and later released on video as A Night in London.

== Critical reception ==
Professional ratings
Review scores
Source	Rating
AllMusic	3/5 stars

In his review for AllMusic, William Ruhlmann found that despite Knopfler's trademark guitar work and sardonic lyrics, there was "little on the album that was new or striking, and Knopfler seemed to fall back on familiar guitar techniques while intoning often obscure lyrics. Ruhlmann set aside any reference to the musical effect of Knopfler's eclectic and newly introduced acoustic bass, string arrangements or traditional Irish accompaniments and concluded:

Knopfler hadn't used the opportunity of a solo album to challenge himself, and at the same time he had lost the group identity (however illusory) provided by the Dire Straits name. The result was listenable but secondhand.

== Track listing ==
All tracks are written by Mark Knopfler.

No.	Title	Length
1.	"Darling Pretty"	4:31
2.	"Imelda"	5:26
3.	"Golden Heart"	5:01
4.	"No Can Do"	4:54
5.	"Vic and Ray"	4:36
6.	"Don't You Get It?"	5:16
7.	"A Night in Summer Long Ago"	4:43
8.	"Cannibals"	3:41
9.	"I'm the Fool"	4:28
10.	"Je Suis Désolé"	5:14
11.	"Rüdiger"	6:03
12.	"Nobody's Got the Gun"	5:25
13.	"Done with Bonaparte"	5:06
14.	"Are We in Trouble Now"	5:54
Total length:		70:18

== Personnel ==
Music

- Mark Knopfler – guitar, vocals
- Richard Bennett – acoustic guitar (1, 2, 3, 8, 9, 11, 12), guitar (5, 6) tiplé (10)
- Sonny Landreth – National steel guitar (10), backing vocals (10)
- Don Potter – acoustic guitar (14)
- Paul Franklin – pedal steel guitar (1, 9, 11, 12, 14)
- Derek Bell – Irish harp (1)
- Paul Brady – whistle (1, 7, 13)
- Seán Keane – violin (1, 7, 13)
- Dónal Lunny – bouzouki (1, 7, 13)
- Máirtín O'Connor – accordion (1, 7, 13)
- Liam O'Flynn – uilleann pipes (7, 13)
- Steve Conn – accordion (10)
- Jo-El Sonnier – accordion (8)
- Michael Doucet – fiddle (10)
- Matt Rollings – piano (1, 5, 11)
- Barry Beckett – piano (9, 12)
- Hargus "Pig" Robbins – piano (14)
- Bill Cuomo – Hammond organ (6)
- Guy Fletcher – keyboards (3, 4, 8, 12), backing vocals (1, 2, 3, 4, 6, 8)
- Steve Nathan – Hammond organ (1, 2, 8, 9, 12, 14), keyboards (3, 5, 9, 11, 14)
- Paul Moore – bass guitar (13), string bass (7)
- Michael Rhodes – bass guitar (1, 5, 9, 10, 11, 12, 14)
- Glenn Worf – bass guitar (2, 3, 6), string bass (4, 8)
- Eddie Bayers – drums (1, 5, 9, 10, 11, 12, 14)
- Robbie Casserly – drums (13)
- Chad Cromwell – drums (2, 3, 4, 6, 8)
- Danny Cummings – backing vocals (1, 3, 4, 6, 8, 10, 11), percussion (2, 4, 5, 11, 12, 14)
- Terry McMillan – djembe (5)
- Billy Ware – triangle (10)
- Brendan Croker – backing vocals (4, 8)
- Vince Gill – backing vocals (12, 14)

Production

- Mark Knopfler – producer
- Chuck Ainlay – producer, engineer, mixing
- Brian Masterson – engineer
- Graham Lewis – assistant engineer, mixing assistant
- Denny Purcell – mastering
- Jonathan Russell – mastering assistant
- David Scheinmann – photography

== Charts ==
=== Weekly charts ===
Chart (1996)	Peak position
Australian Albums (ARIA)	28
Austrian Albums (Ö3 Austria)	8
Belgian Albums (Ultratop Flanders)	10
Belgian Albums (Ultratop Wallonia)	8
Dutch Albums (Album Top 100)	3
Finnish Albums (Suomen virallinen lista)	7
French Albums (SNEP)	38
German Albums (Offizielle Top 100)	5
Hungarian Albums (MAHASZ)	11
New Zealand Albums (RMNZ)	16
Norwegian Albums (VG-lista)	2
Scottish Albums (OCC)	12
Swedish Albums (Sverigetopplistan)	4
Swiss Albums (Schweizer Hitparade)	3
UK Albums (OCC)	9
US Billboard 200	105

=== Year-end charts ===
Chart (1996)	Position
Austrian Albums (Ö3 Austria)	50
Dutch Albums (Album Top 100)	40
German Albums (Offizielle Top 100)	36
Swiss Albums (Schweizer Hitparade)	17
UK Albums (OCC)	85

== Certifications ==
Region	Certification	Certified units/sales
Australia (ARIA)	Gold	35,000^{^}
Canada (Music Canada)	Gold	50,000^{^}
Netherlands (NVPI)	Gold	50,000^{^}
Norway (IFPI Norway)	Gold	25,000^{*}
Spain (PROMUSICAE)	Platinum	100,000^{^}
Switzerland (IFPI Switzerland)	Gold	25,000^{^}
United Kingdom (BPI)	Gold	100,000^{^}
Summaries
Europe (IFPI)	Platinum	1,000,000^{*}
^{*} Sales figures based on certification alone.^{^} Shipments figures based on certification alone.
