= A Tribute to Led Zeppelin =

Studio album by Beth Hart
- Released: February 25, 2022
- Length: 55:19
- Label: Provogue; Mascot
- Producer: Rob Cavallo

Beth Hart chronology
War in My Mind (2019)	A Tribute to Led Zeppelin (2022)	You Still Got Me (2024)

Professional ratings
Review scores
Source	Rating
Classic Rock	3.5/5 stars

A Tribute to Led Zeppelin is a cover album and the tenth solo studio album by American singer-songwriter Beth Hart, released on February 25, 2022, through Provogue Records and Mascot Label Group. It was produced by Rob Cavallo and features string arrangements from David Campbell. The album debuted at number one in the UK (Rock & Metal Albums) and in the Netherlands (Album Top 100).

== Critical reception ==
Reviewing the album for Classic Rock, John Aizlewood called Hart "more qualified than most to have a go" at a Led Zeppelin tribute album, writing that her "grizzled but technically proficient voice carries more than a hint of Robert Plant's, especially on her rampage through 'Whole Lotta Love'". Awarding the album three-and-a-half stars out of five, he concluded that while it is an "exhilarating labour of love", it does not offer "anything new" to the "rock perfection" of the original songs.

== Track listing ==
A Tribute to Led Zeppelin track listing
No.	Title	Writer(s)	Length
1.	"Whole Lotta Love"	John Bonham; Willie Dixon; John Paul Jones; Jimmy Page; Robert Plant	5:55
2.	"Kashmir"	Bonham; Page; Plant	8:15
3.	"Stairway to Heaven"	Page; Plant	7:54
4.	"The Crunge"	Bonham; Jones; Page; Plant	3:20
5.	"Dancing Days, Pt. 1"	Page; Plant	3:14
6.	"When the Levee Breaks"	Bonham; Jones; Memphis Minnie; Page; Plant	2:52
7.	"Dancing Days, Pt. 2"	Page; Plant	1:09
8.	"Black Dog"	Jones; Page; Plant	4:47
9.	"No Quarter"	Jones; Page; Plant	3:22
10.	"Babe I'm Gonna Leave You"	Anne Bredon; Page; Plant	3:49
11.	"Good Times Bad Times"	Page; Bonham; Jones	2:49
12.	"The Rain Song"	Page; Plant	7:53
Total length:			55:19

== Charts ==
Chart performance for A Tribute to Led Zeppelin
Chart (2022)	Peak position
Austrian Albums (Ö3 Austria)	2
Belgian Albums (Ultratop Flanders)	7
Belgian Albums (Ultratop Wallonia)	8
Czech Albums (ČNS IFPI)	26
Dutch Albums (Album Top 100)	1
Finnish Albums (Suomen virallinen lista)	21
French Albums (SNEP)	36
German Albums (Offizielle Top 100)	4
Italian Albums (FIMI)	84
Polish Albums (ZPAV)	3
Scottish Albums (OCC)	9
Swiss Albums (Schweizer Hitparade)	3
UK Albums (OCC)	17
UK Independent Albums (OCC)	3
UK Rock & Metal Albums (OCC)	1
