= Nick Spitzer =

American radio personality

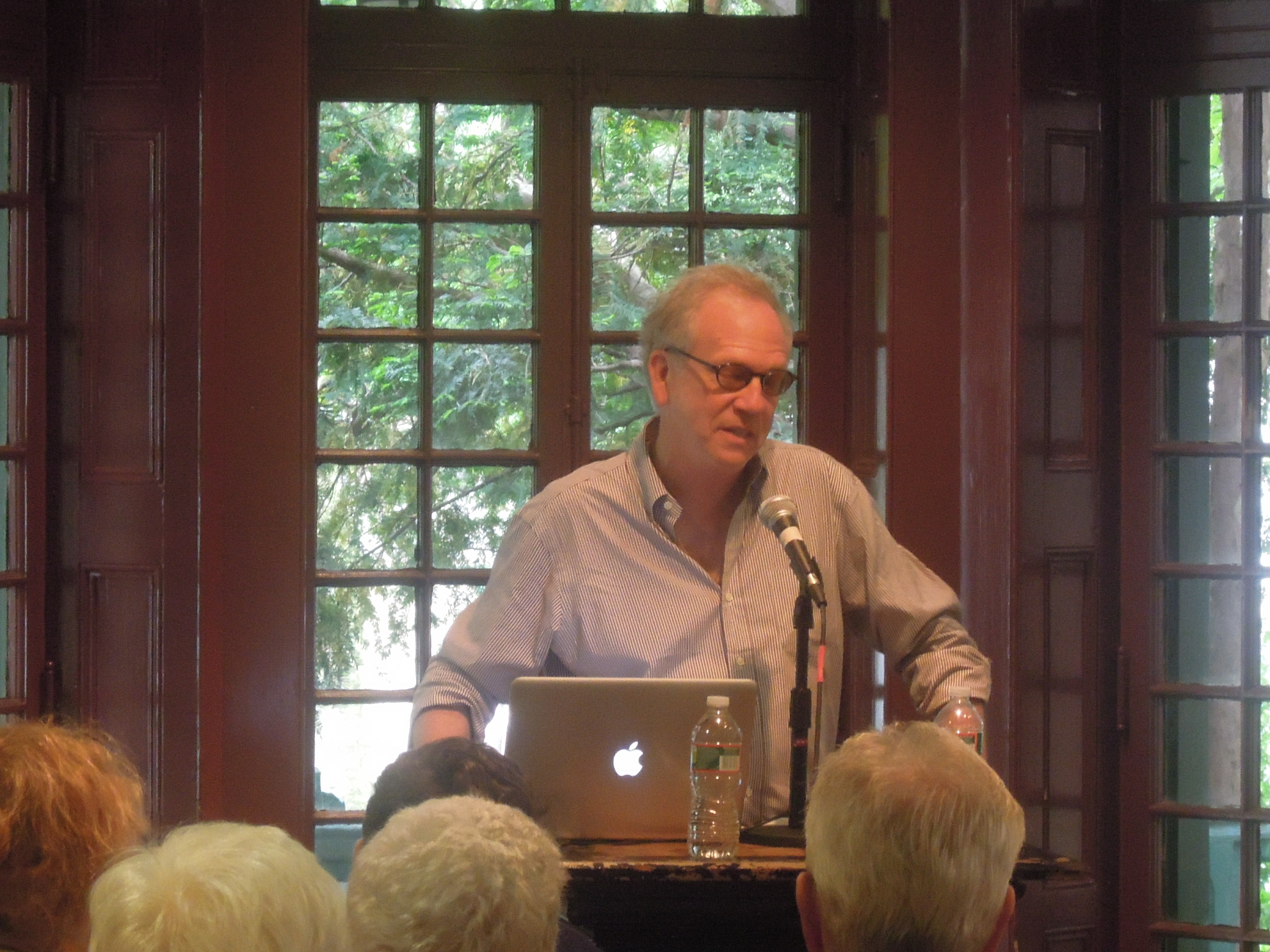
- Spitzer speaking on May 11, 2013 at University of Pennsylvania Kelly Writer's House Arts Cafe
- Born: New York City, New York, U.S.
- Education: Wharton School; University of Texas at Austin
- Occupations: Radio host, folklorist
- Known for: Hosting American Routes

Nicholas R. Spitzer (born 1950 or 1951) is an American radio personality and folklorist.

He has hosted the public radio show American Routes since its 1997 premiere. He was Louisiana's first State Folklorist, and the founding director of the Louisiana Folklife Program. He has also been the senior folklife specialist at the Smithsonian Institution's Center for Folklife and Cultural Heritage, and a commentator and producer for NPR, CBS and ABC.

Spitzer is the editor and co-writer of numerous books, including Public Folklore and Blues for New Orleans: Mardi Gras and America’s Creole Soul. He is a professor of Anthropology and American Studies at Tulane University.

== Early life and education ==
Spitzer was born in New York City and raised in rural Connecticut. He became interested in radio at a young age after listening to broadcasts of baseball games.

He entered the Wharton School at the University of Pennsylvania in 1968, later graduating in 1972 with a degree in anthropology. He earned a doctorate in anthropology from the University of Texas at Austin, graduating in 1976. His dissertation focused on zydeco music.

== Career ==
Spitzer was hired by the Smithsonian to help plan the 1976 United States Bicentennial Festival.

=== Radio ===
While a student at the University of Pennsylvania, Spitzer joined the staff of WXPN in Philadelphia in 1969. He later became the station's program director. He was introduced to Louisiana music while working at the radio station. He later worked at WMMR from 1972 to 1974. After leaving Philadelphia, Spitzer spent time in Louisiana, where he learned more about the state's music and culture.

While studying for his doctorate in Austin, Texas, he worked at KOKE-FM and as a host and producer at NPR affiliate KUT-FM.

In 1997, Spitzer became the host of American Routes.

=== Folklore and academia ===
Spitzer moved to Baton Rouge in 1978. He served as Louisiana State Folklorist from 1978 to 1985. He founded the Louisiana Folklife Program and helped develop the Baton Rouge Blues Festival. He also produced a five-LP recording series on Louisiana folklife. In 1984, he organized the Louisiana Folklife Pavilion at the 1984 World's Fair in New Orleans and directed the documentary ZYDECO: Creole Music and Culture in Rural Louisiana.

Spitzer left Louisiana in 1985 after he was hired by the Smithsonian Institution as a senior folklife specialist.

From 1990 to 1997, he served as artistic director for the "Folk Masters" concert and broadcast series from Carnegie Hall and Wolf Trap; from 1992 to 2001, he produced the NPR broadcasts of Independence Day concerts on the National Mall.

Spitzer accepted a position at the University of New Orleans in 1997, and was hired by Tulane University in 2008.

== Personal life ==
Spitzer was diagnosed with cancer in 1979, and underwent multiple rounds of chemotherapy and stays at Baton Rouge General Hospital; he entered remission in 1980.

Spitzer lived in New Orleans in the early 2000s, and lived in the Acadiana region after he was displaced by Hurricane Katrina in 2005. Following the hurricane, Spitzer was vocal about the need for recovery to focus on cultural elements of New Orleans, including music and food.

As of 2023, Spitzer lives in New Orleans with his wife and son.

== Awards and recognition ==
He was named the Louisiana Humanist of the Year in 2006 for his work towards cultural recovery after Hurricane Katrina.

In 2014, Spitzer received the James Williams Rivers Prize in Louisiana Studies from the University of Louisiana for his contribution to Louisiana folklore.

He is a recipient of a 2023 National Heritage Fellowship awarded by the National Endowment for the Arts, which is the United States government's highest honor in the folk and traditional arts.

== Publications ==
- The Mississippi Delta Ethnographic Overview (1979)
- Louisiana Folklife: A Guide to the State (1985)
- Baron, Robert; Spitzer, Nick, eds. (2010-12-06). Public Folklore. University Press of Mississippi. ISBN 978-1-60473-316-7.
- Abrahams, Roger; Spitzer, Nick (2010-11-24). Blues for New Orleans: Mardi Gras and America's Creole Soul. University of Pennsylvania Press. ISBN 978-0-8122-0100-0.
