= Front and Center – Live from New York =

Live album by Beth Hart
- Released: April 13, 2018
- Venue: Iridium Jazz Club
- Genre: Jazz, soul blues, piano blues, electric blues
- Length: 1:12:12 (CD)
- Label: Provogue / Mascot Label
- Producer: Don Maggi (executive producer), Denis Gallagher (executive producer), Ken Sturm (executive producer), Ron Sturm (executive producer), Christine Davies Reagan (supervising producer), Grace Blake

Beth Hart chronology
Black Coffee (2018)	Front and Center – Live from New York (2018)	Live at the Royal Albert Hall (2018)

Professional ratings
Review scores
Source	Rating
Renowned for Sound	3.5/5 stars

Front and Center – Live from New York is the third live album by American singer-songwriter Beth Hart, 13 years since her first solo concert album, released on April 13, 2018 by Provogue. It was recorded at a live performance at the music venue Iridium Jazz Club in New York City, United States. A DVD was released with the CD. The performance also was featured on the Season 8 premiere episode of public television's concert series, Front and Center.

== Track listing ==
CD

No.	Title	Writer(s)	Length
1.	"Let's Get Together"	Beth Hart, Rune Westberg	4:09
2.	"Baddest Blues"	Hart	5:09
3.	"Jazz Man"	Hart	4:07
4.	"Delicious Surprise"	Hart, Glen Burtnik	6:02
5.	"Broken and Ugly"	Hart	3:40
6.	"St. Teresa"	Hart	6:34
7.	"Isolation"	Hart, James Khoury, Tal Herzberg	4:25
8.	"Tell Her You Belong to Me"	Hart	6:36
9.	"Fat Man"	Hart, Burtnik	4:04
10.	"Love Gangster"	Hart	4:06
11.	"Leave the Light On"	Hart, Oliver Leiber	5:35
12.	"As Long As I Have a Song"	Hart	3:32
13.	"Can't Let Go"	Randy Weeks	4:35
14.	"For My Friends"	Bill Withers	5:12
15.	"No Place Like Home"	Hart	4:26
Total length:			1:12:12

Record Store Day 2019 Vinyl Bonus Track
No.	Title	Writer(s)	Length
16.	"My California"	Hart, Westberg	5:02

DVD

Front and Center Show

No.	Title	Writer(s)	Length
1.	"Let's Get Together"	Hart, Westberg	4:29
2.	"Baddest Blues"	Hart	5:17
3.	"Jazz Man"	Hart	4:33
4.	"Delicious Surprise"	Hart, Burtnik	6:44
5.	"St. Teresa"	Hart	6:40
6.	"Tell Her You Belong to Me"	Hart	6:32
7.	"Fat Man"	Hart, Burtnik	4:12
8.	"Leave the Light On"	Hart, Oliver Leiber	5:36
9.	"Can't Let Go"	Weeks	4:56
10.	"As Long As I Have a Song"	Hart	4:27
11.	"Credits"		1:22
Total length:			54:28

Full Band Bonus Content

No.	Title	Writer(s)	Length
1.	"Love Gangster"	Hart	5:35
2.	"Broken and Ugly"	Hart	3:32
3.	"For My Friends"	Withers	4:35
Total length:			12:37

Acoustic Bonus Content

No.	Title	Writer(s)	Length
1.	"Isolation"	Hart, Khoury, Herzberg	5:12
2.	"My California"	Hart, Westberg	4:26
3.	"No Place Like Home"	Hart	4:35
Total length:			13:19

Additional Bonus Content

No.	Title	Length
1.	"Beth Hart Interview"	17:51

== Personnel ==
Musicians

- Beth Hart – vocals, piano, acoustic guitar, bass
- Jon Nichols – electric guitar, acoustic guitar, backing vocals
- Bill Ransom – drums
- Bob Marinelli – bass
- Sonny Landreth (special guest) – guitar

Production

- Don Maggi – executive producer
- Denis Gallagher – executive producer
- Ken Sturm – executive producer
- Ron Sturm – executive producer
- Christine Davies Reagan – supervising producer
- Grace Blake – producer
- Lance McVickar – director, recording engineer, mix engineer, camera operator, editor
- William E. Gastfield III – backup audio recording
- Erik Kohlhoff – assistant audio engineer
- Chris Gilroy Editor – assistant audio engineer
- Alex Petrai – lighting
- Miles Adgate – camera
- Nick Vega – camera
- Patrick Heaphy – camera
- Megan Dovico – production assistant
- Jim Belmont – photographer
- Roy Koch – graphic design
- Willem Heijnen – graphic design
