= Sonny Landreth =

American blues musician (born 1951)

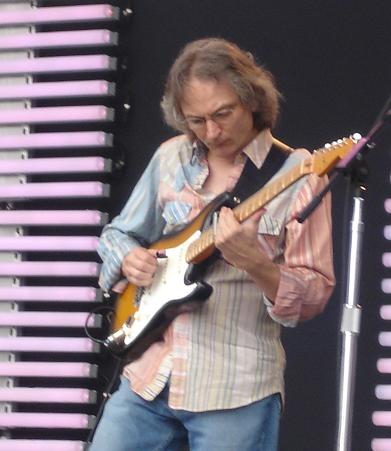
- Landreth in 2007

Background information
- Born: Clide Vernon Landreth; February 1, 1951 (age 75); Canton, Mississippi, U.S.
- Genres: Blues, country blues, zydeco
- Instruments: Guitar; vocals
- Years active: 1973–present
- Label: Provogue Records
- Website: sonnylandreth.com

Clide Vernon "Sonny" Landreth (born February 1, 1951) is an American blues musician from southwest Louisiana who is especially known as a slide guitar player. He was born in Canton, Mississippi, and settled in Lafayette, Louisiana. He lives in Breaux Bridge, Louisiana.

== Technique ==
Landreth is known as "the King of Slydeco" and plays with a strong zydeco influence. Guitarist Eric Clapton has said that Landreth is one of the most advanced guitarists in the world and one of the most under-appreciated.

Landreth is best known for his slide guitar playing, having developed a technique where he also frets notes and plays chords and chord fragments by fretting behind the slide while he plays. Landreth plays with the slide on his little finger, so that his other fingers have more room to fret behind the slide. He is also known for his right-hand technique, which involves tapping, slapping, and picking strings, using all of the fingers on his right hand. He wears a special thumb pick/flat pick hybrid on his thumb so that he can bear down on a pick while simultaneously using his finger-style technique for slide.

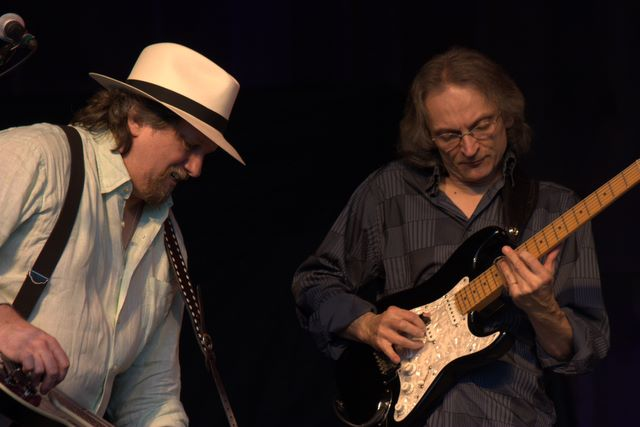
Landreth jams with Jerry Douglas at MerleFest.

Landreth is known for his use of Fender Stratocaster guitars and Dumble Amplifiers. He is also known to use Demeter, Fender, and Matchless Amplifiers on occasion. Landreth uses Jim Dunlop 215 heavy glass slides and Dunlop Herco flat thumb picks. His guitars are fitted with DiMarzio and Lindy Fralin pickups, a special Suhr back plate system, and D'Addario medium nickel wound strings gauges 0.13 - 0.56.

== Bands and associated acts ==
Landreth first played in Clifton Chenier's Red Hot Louisiana Band, as the only white member of the band. In 1981, he released his first record, Blues Attack, which also featured C.J. Chenier on saxophone and Mel Melton on harmonica. In 1982, Landreth and Melton formed the band Bayou Rhythm, and eventually added C.J. Chenier to the lineup. The band recorded Way Down in Louisiana in 1985 Landreth also frequently played in John Hiatt's band, and with John Mayall and the Bluesbreakers.

== Other artists ==
Vince Gill stated that "Tell Me Lover" was based in part on Landreth's song, "Congo Square".

In 1998, Landreth was involved in the multi-artist project "Begegnungen (Encounters)" mounted by Germany's Rock-Superstar Peter Maffay. They performed together on a new version of Landreth's "C'est chaud" on the album and some more songs in the 30 concerts at the arena tour later the same year, documented on the live album Begegnungen Live, released in early 1999. A further guest of Maffay at the Begegnungen album and tour was Keb' Mo'.

Landreth has recorded with Jimmy Buffett, and accompanied him on his 2004, 2006, 2007, and 2010 summer tours.

Landreth took the main stage at MerleFest in 2011.

Landreth appeared on HBO's Treme, Season 3, Episode 8

Landreth performed at Clapton's Crossroads Guitar Festival in 2004, 2007, 2010, 2013 and 2019.

In 2014, Landreth was a guest performer on Eli Cook's album, Primitive Son.

== Discography ==
=== Solo ===
Landreth has released at least the following albums:

- Blues Attack (1981; re-released 1996)
- Way Down in Louisiana (1985; re-released 1993)
- Outward Bound (1992)
- South of I-10 (1995)
- The Crazy Cajun Recordings (1999) - source material from 1973 and 1977
- Prodigal Son: The Collection (2000) - source material from 1973 and 1977
- Levee Town (2000; re-released 2009 with five bonus tracks)
- The Road We're On (2003), charted No. 1 on Billboard's Blues Album Chart.
- Grant Street (2005) - live recording, charted No. 2 on Billboard's Blues Album Chart.
- From the Reach (2008), charted No. 1 on Billboard's Blues Album Chart.
- Voices of Americana (2009)
- Sunrise (2012)
- Elemental Journey (2012), charted No. 4 on Billboard's Blues Album Chart.
- Bound by the Blues (2015)
- Recorded Live in Lafayette (2017)
- Blacktop Run (2020)

=== Guest appearances ===
- Marti Jones, Used Guitars (1988)
- Zachary Richard, Manchac (1988)
- Marshall Crenshaw, Good Evening (1989)
- John Mayall, A Sense of Place (1990)
- Alain Bashung, Osez Joséphine (1991)
- Kenny Loggins, Outside: From the Redwoods (1993)
- Stephan Eicher, Carcassonne (1993)
- Alain Bashung, Chatterton (1994)
- "Then I'm Gonna Make Love To You" on Selling the Gold (1995) by Elliott Murphy
- Mark Knopfler, A Night In London (1996)
- Mark Knopfler, Golden Heart (1996)
- Gov't Mule, 32/20 Blues (2003)
- Gov't Mule, On Your Way Down (2003)
- Eric Clapton's Crossroads Guitar Festival (2007)
- Arlen Roth, Toolin' Around Woodstock (2007) with Levon Helm
- Little Feat, Join The Band (2008)
- "When The Levee Breaks" and "The Wrong Side" on Lay Your Burden Down (2009) by Buckwheat Zydeco
- "Don't Wanna Do It" on A Part Of Me (2010) by Tom Principato
- "T-Bone Shuffle" on Roots (2011) by Johnny Winter
- Eli Cook, Primitive Son (2014)
- Arlen Roth, Slide Guitar Summit (2016)
- Layla Zoe, Breaking Free (2016)
- Beth Hart, Front and Center - Live from New York (2018)
- "Wedding Day" and "Break My Heart Gently" on Another World by Erja Lyytinen (2019)
- "Gemini Blues" on This Old House by Camile Baudoin (of The Radiators) (2021)
- "Too Far To Be Gone" on Done Come Too Far by Shemekia Copeland (2022)

with John Hiatt:

- Slow Turning (1988)
- The Tiki Bar is Open (2001)
- Beneath This Gruff Exterior (2003)

with Eric Johnson:

- Up Close album (2010) track "Your Book"

with others:

- Marti Jones, Used Guitars (1988)
- Zachary Richard, Manchac (1988)
- Marshall Crenshaw, Good Evening (1989)
- Alain Bashung, Osez Joséphine (1991)
- Alain Bashung, Chatterton (1994)
- "When the Levee Breaks" and "The Wrong Side" on Lay Your Burden Down by Buckwheat Zydeco
- "Then I'm Gonna Make Love To You" on Selling The Gold by Elliott Murphy
- Mark Knopfler, Golden Heart (1996)
- Mark Knopfler, A Night In London (1996)
- Gov't Mule, 32/20 Blues
- Eric Clapton's Crossroads Guitar Festival (2007)
- Little Feat, Join The Band (2008)
- Eric Clapton's Crossroads Guitar Festival (2010)
- "T-Bone Shuffle" on Roots by Johnny Winter
- Eli Cook, Primitive Son (2014).
- Eric Clapton's Crossroads Guitar Festival (2019)
- Dion, "I Got the Cure" from Blues with Friends (2020)

== Honors and awards ==
- Americana Music Association Instrumentalist of the Year: 2005
- Blues Music Award in the 'Instrumentalist - Guitar' category 2016.

Awards
Preceded by Will Kimbrough	AMA Instrumentalist of the Year; 2005	Succeeded by Kenny Vaughan
