= From the Reach =

Studio album by Sonny Landreth
- Released: May 20, 2008
- Genre: Blues
- Length: 46:52
- Label: Landfall

Sonny Landreth chronology
Sonny Landreth - Live At Jazz Fest 2007 (2007)	From the Reach (2008)

Professional ratings
Review scores
Source	Rating
AllMusic	4/5 stars

From the Reach is the eleventh studio album from Sonny Landreth. Released on May 20, 2008, it is his first album to be released under his own label Landfall Records. The album features appearances by Jimmy Buffett, Eric Clapton, Robben Ford, Vince Gill, Eric Johnson, Dr. John, Mark Knopfler, and Nadirah Shakoor.

The album title refers to water imagery that occurred for Landreth during the writing process. It also refers to Landreth asking other musicians to join him on the album.

== Track listing ==
1. "Blue Tarp Blues" (Landreth) - 4:39
2. "When I Still Had You" (Landreth) - 4:42
3. "Way Past Long" (Landreth) - 5:08
4. "The Milky Way Home" (Landreth) - 4:10
5. "Storm of Worry" (Landreth) - 3:56
6. "Howlin' Moon" (Landreth) - 5:19
7. "The Goin' On" (Landreth, Wendy Waldman) - 3:25
8. "Let It Fly" (Landreth) - 4:52
9. "Blue Angel" (Landreth) - 4:00
10. "Überesso" (Landreth) - 2:44
11. "Universe" (Landreth) - 3:38

== Personnel ==
- Sonny Landreth - lead vocals, lead guitar
- David Ranson - bass
- Michael Burch - drums
- Steve Conn - keys
- Sam Broussard - keys, acoustic guitar
- Tony Daigle - percussion
- Brian Brignac - Percussion

With:

- Jimmy Buffett - vocals ("Howlin' Moon")
- Eric Clapton - guitar, vocals ("When I Still Had You"), guitar ("Storm Of Worry")
- Robben Ford - guitar, vocals ("Way Past Long"), guitar ("Blue Angel")
- Vince Gill - guitar, vocals ("The Goin' On") vocals ("Blue Angel" & "Universe")
- Dr. John - piano, vocals ("Howlin' Moon")
- Eric Johnson - guitar ("The Milky Way Home")
- Mark Knopfler - guitar, vocals ("Blue Tarp Blues")
- Nadirah Shakoor - vocals ("Let It Fly")
