= South of I-10 =

Studio album by Sonny Landreth
- Released: 1995
- Recorded: 1995
- Studio: Dockside, Maurice, Louisiana
- Genre: Blues
- Length: 44:54
- Label: Praxis/Zoo

Sonny Landreth chronology
Outward Bound (1992)	South of I-10 (1995)	Levee Town (2000)

Professional ratings
Review scores
Source	Rating
AllMusic	4.5/5 stars
Robert Christgau	(choice cut)
Entertainment Weekly	B+

South of I-10 is the fourth studio album from Sonny Landreth. The album features his first collaboration with Mark Knopfler.

The album featured the first music video for Sonny Landreth for his song, "Native Stepson".

== Track listing ==
1. "Shooting for the Moon" (Landreth) - 3:33
2. "Creole Angel" (Landreth) - 4:16
3. "Native Stepson" (Landreth) - 3:36
4. "Orphans of the Motherland" (Landreth) - 3:37
5. "Congo Square" (Landreth, Melton, Ranson)- 6:24
6. "Turning Wheel" (Landreth) - 4:35
7. "South of I-10" (Landreth) - 3:39
8. "Cajun Waltz" (Landreth) - 3:41
9. "Mojo Boogie" (Lenoir) - 4:31
10. "C'Est Chaud"(Landreth) - 3:19
11. "Great Gulf Wind" (Toussaint) - 5:07
12. "Untitled Track" (Landreth) - 1:40

== Personnel ==
- Sonny Landreth – lead vocals, lead guitar
- Allen Toussaint – piano
- Marce Lacouture – background vocals
- Steve Conn – Hammond B-3 Organ
- David Ranson – bass
- Greg Morrow – drums and percussion
- R.S. Field – acoustic rhythm guitar
- Mark Knopfler – background vocals ("Shootin' for the Moon"), National rhythm guitars ("Creole Angel"), lead and rhythm guitars ("Congo Square")
