= War in My Mind =

Studio album by Beth Hart
- Released: September 27, 2019
- Studios: Sphere Studios (North Hollywood, California); The Village Recorder (Los Angeles, California)
- Length: 52:01
- Labels: Provogue; Mascot Label
- Producer: Rob Cavallo

Beth Hart chronology
| Live at the Royal Albert Hall (2018) | War in My Mind (2019) | A Tribute to Led Zeppelin (2022) |

War in My Mind is the ninth solo studio album by American singer-songwriter Beth Hart, released on September 27, 2019. The album was produced by Rob Cavallo. Hart was slated tour the UK and Europe in support of the album in 2020, but had to cancel a large fraction due to the COVID-19 pandemic.

== Background ==
In the album announcement, Hart commented: "More than any record I've ever made, I'm more open to being myself on these songs [...] On this record, something told me, 'Just let it be what it is.' I think I'm starting to make a little headway, getting closer to the truth. And I might not know what the truth is... but I'm OK with that."

== Critical reception ==
Professional ratings
Review scores
| Source | Rating |
|---|---|
| AllMusic | 3.5/5 stars |
| American Songwriter | 3.5/5 stars |
| Classic Rock | 7/10 |
| laut.de | 4/5 stars |

Writing for American Songwriter, Hal Horowitz called it "arguably [Hart's] most intimate and intense set yet", further commenting that "Her dynamic, classically influenced piano propels most songs including the ballads, such as the title track, that dominate this set. [...] There's no denying the truth, integrity and gritty realism that infuses everything Beth Hart touches." Pablo Gorondi of the Chicago Sun-Times stated: "Her struggles might be internal. But, venting in song, Hart again confirms the force of music and its therapeutic value."

== Track listing ==
| No. | Title | Length |
|---|---|---|
| 1. | "Bad Woman Blues" | 3:35 |
| 2. | "War in My Mind" | 4:22 |
| 3. | "Without Words in the Way" | 4:36 |
| 4. | "Let It Grow" | 4:51 |
| 5. | "Try a Little Harder" | 3:52 |
| 6. | "Sister Dear" | 3:34 |
| 7. | "Spanish Lullabies" | 3:28 |
| 8. | "Rub Me for Luck" | 4:32 |
| 9. | "Sugar Shack" | 3:58 |
| 10. | "Woman Down" | 5:48 |
| 11. | "Thankful" | 4:24 |
| 12. | "I Need a Hero" | 5:01 |
| Total length: | | 52:01 |

== Charts ==
| Chart (2019) | Peak position |
|---|---|
| Australian Albums (ARIA) | 64 |
| Austrian Albums (Ö3 Austria) | 26 |
| Belgian Albums (Ultratop Flanders) | 18 |
| Belgian Albums (Ultratop Wallonia) | 32 |
| Czech Albums (ČNS IFPI) | 47 |
| Dutch Albums (Album Top 100) | 9 |
| German Albums (Offizielle Top 100) | 6 |
| Norwegian Albums (VG-lista) | 34 |
| Polish Albums (ZPAV) | 15 |
| Scottish Albums (Official Charts) | 7 |
| Swiss Albums (Schweizer Hitparade) | 13 |
| UK Albums (Official Charts) | 19 |
