= Festivals Acadiens et Créoles =

American music festival

Coordinates: 30.20655°N 92.02013°W

- Genre: Cajun, Créole, Zydeco
- Location: Lafayette, Louisiana
- Years active: 1977 - present
- Website: festivalsacadiens.com

Festivals Acadiens et Créoles is a three-day festival celebrating the music, crafts, and food of South Louisiana. It is held annually in Lafayette, Louisiana.

== History ==
Festivals Acadiens et Créoles formed from many other local events. The oldest single component of this cooperative is the Louisiana Native and Contemporary Crafts Festival (then named the Louisiana Native Crafts Festival), first presented October 28, 1972. CODOFIL started a Tribute to Cajun Music concert in 1974. In 1977, the Lafayette Convention and Visitors Commission merged the Tribute to Cajun Music and the Bayou food Festival. Together, these events became known as the Festivals Acadiens.

A virtual festival was held in 2020.

== See also ==
- Festival International
