= Mark Knopfler discography =

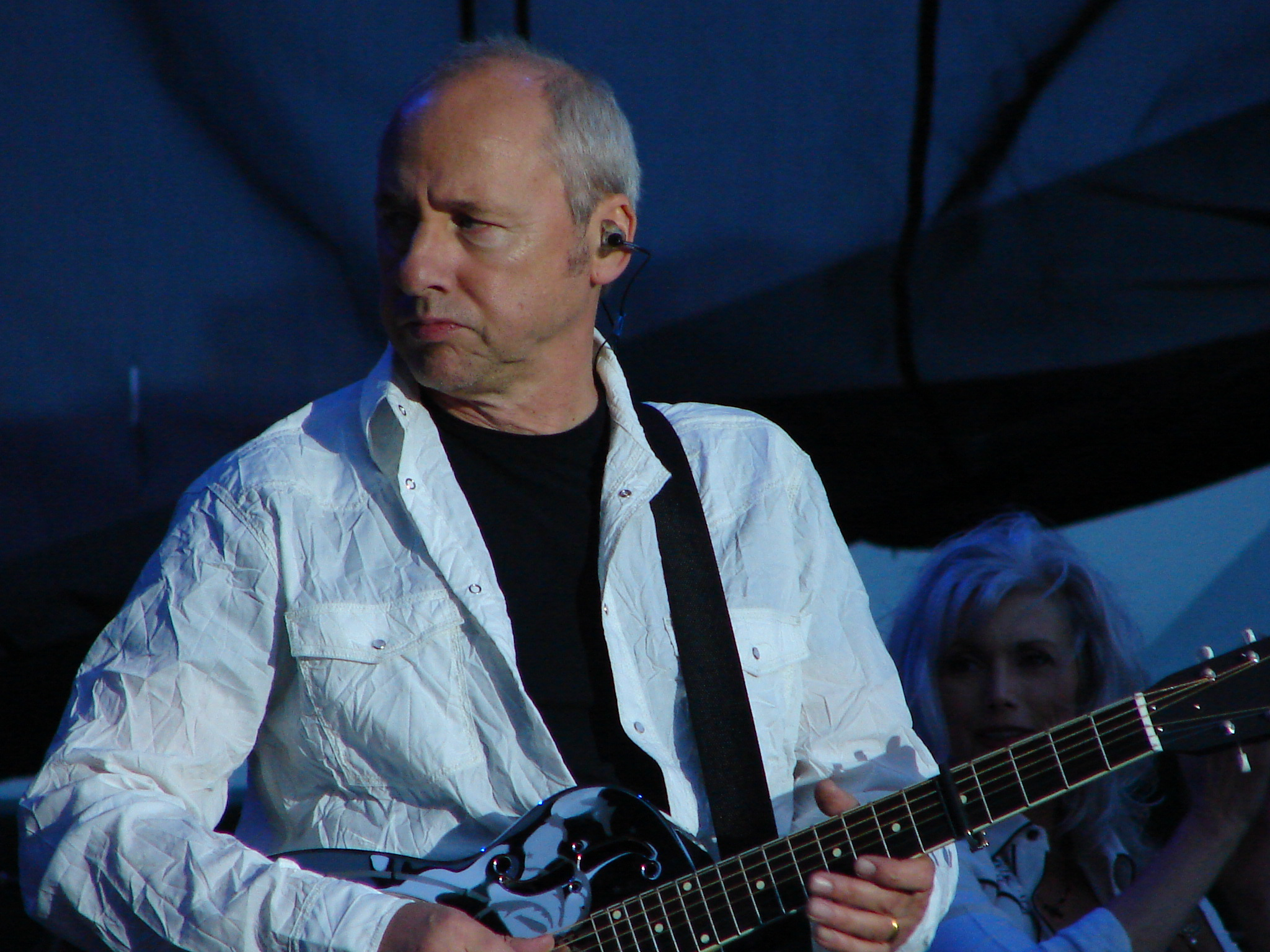
- Knopfler in Chicago, 2006
- Studio albums: 10
- Extended plays: 3
- Soundtrack albums: 9
- Compilation albums: 2
- Singles: 26
- Video albums: 4
- Music videos: 20
- Collaborative albums: 3
- Produced albums: 5
- Other appearances: 10

The Mark Knopfler discography consists of recordings by British singer-songwriter and guitarist Mark Knopfler, not including his work with Dire Straits. Knopfler began recording apart from Dire Straits in 1983, when he released his first soundtrack album Local Hero. That same year he produced his first album, Infidels for Bob Dylan. Between 1983 and 2016, Knopfler composed and released nine soundtrack albums, the last of which was with Evelyn Glennie.

After he quietly disbanded Dire Straits in 1995, Knopfler released his first solo album Golden Heart in 1996. In total, he has released ten studio albums, two collaborative studio albums with Chet Atkins and Emmylou Harris, and twenty-two singles. In addition, Knopfler has also produced four additional albums for other artists, including Land of Dreams in 1988 for Randy Newman, and has appeared on many albums by other artists, providing guitar tracks or guest appearance vocals.

== Albums ==
=== Studio albums ===
Year	Album details	Peak chart positions												Certifications (sales thresholds)
Year	Album details	UK	AUS	AUT	CAN	FIN	FRA	NLD	NOR	NZ	SWE	SWI	US	Certifications (sales thresholds)
1996	Golden Heart	9	28	8	11	7	38	3	2	16	4	3	105	UK: Gold; AUS: Gold; CAN: Gold; NOR: Gold; SWI: Gold; NVPI: Gold
2000	Sailing to Philadelphia	4	16	2	19	3	7	2	1	11	2	1	60	UK: Gold; AUS: Gold; CAN: Gold; FIN: Gold; FRA: Platinum; GER: Platinum; NOR: 3× Platinum; US: Gold; SWI: Platinum; NVPI: 5× Platinum
2002	The Ragpicker's Dream	7	47	9	18	7	4	2	1	8	5	5	38	UK: Gold; FRA: Gold; NOR: Platinum; SWI: Gold; NVPI: Gold; GER: Gold
2004	Shangri-La	11	69	14	—	10	5	4	1	1	3	7	66	UK: Silver; GER: Gold; SWI: Gold
2007	Kill to Get Crimson	9	41	10	—	15	9	4	2	2	4	3	26	UK: Silver; SWI: Gold
2009	Get Lucky	9	43	10	16	17	10	3	1	5	6	5	17	UK: Silver
2012	Privateering	8	25	1	23	7	10	1	1	3	2	2	65	GER: Gold; UK: Gold
2015	Tracker	3	12	1	4	5	6	1	1	4	3	2	14	UK: Silver; SWI: Gold
2018	Down the Road Wherever	17	14	4	6	3	17	5	1	10	2	1	15	NVPI: Gold
2024	One Deep River	3	48	—	—	8	—	2	4	15	9	1	157	

=== Soundtrack albums ===
- Local Hero (1983)
- Cal (1984)
- Comfort and Joy (1984)
- The Princess Bride (1987)
- Last Exit to Brooklyn (1989)
- Wag the Dog (1998)
- Metroland (1999)
- A Shot at Glory (2002)
- Altamira (2016) with Evelyn Glennie

=== Collaborative albums ===
==== Studio ====
- Neck and Neck (1990) with Chet Atkins
- All the Roadrunning (2006) with Emmylou Harris

==== Live ====
- Real Live Roadrunning (2006) with Emmylou Harris

=== Compilation albums ===
- Screenplaying (1993)
- The Best of Dire Straits & Mark Knopfler: Private Investigations (2005)
- The Studio Albums 1996–2007 (2021)
- The Studio Albums 2009–2018 (2022)

=== with The Notting Hillbillies ===
- Missing...Presumed Having a Good Time (1990)

== EPs ==
- The Trawlerman's Song EP (2005)
- One Take Radio Sessions (2005)
- The Boy (2024)

== Singles ==
- "Going Home: Theme of the Local Hero" (1983) - UK #56, AUS #29
- "Darling Pretty" (1996) - UK #33
- "Cannibals" (1996) - UK #42, AUS #97
- "Rüdiger" (1996)
- "What It Is" (2000) US (AAA) #3, CH #38, DE #81, FR #56, NL #38, NO #10, IT #3, ES #4
- "Sailing to Philadelphia" - with James Taylor (2001) NL #73
- "Silvertown Blues" (2001)
- "Why Aye Man" (2002) - UK #81
- "Boom, Like That" (2004) - UK #34, US (AAA) #2
- "The Trawlerman's Song" (2005)
- "All the Roadrunning" - with Emmylou Harris (2006) - UK #8
- "This is Us" - with Emmylou Harris (2006) - US (AAA) #5
- "Beachcombing" - with Emmylou Harris (2006)
- "True Love Will Never Fade" (2007)
- "Punish the Monkey" (2007)
- "Border Reiver" (2009)
- "Remembrance Day" (2009)
- "Redbud Tree" (2012)
- "Beryl" (2015) US (AAA) #23
- "Skydiver" (2015)
- "Good on You Son" (2018) US (AAA) #39
- "Back on the Dance Floor" (2018)
- "Ahead of the Game" (2024)
- "Watch Me Gone" (2024)
- "Going Home (Theme from Local Hero)" - with Mark Knopfler's Guitar Heroes (2024) - UK #18
- "Two Pairs of Hands" (2024)

== Other appearances ==
Year	Song	Album	Notes
1986	"Two Brothers and a Stranger"	The Color of Money	original song
1994	"You Better Move On"	Adios Amigo: A Tribute to Arthur Alexander	Arthur Alexander cover with Chuck Jackson
1995	"Lily of the West"	The Long Black Veil	with The Chieftains
1996	"Learning the Game"	Not Fade Away {Remembering Buddy Holly}	Buddy Holly cover with Waylon Jennings
1996	"Atlantis"	Twang! A Tribute to Hank Marvin & the Shadows	The Shadows cover
1997	"On Raglan Road"	Sult: Spirit of the Music	The Dubliners cover
2001	"Rock 'n' Roll Ruby"	Good Rockin' Tonight: The Legacy of Sun Records	Johnny Cash cover
2001	"Alone and Forsaken"	Timeless	Hank Williams cover with Emmylou Harris
2008	"Sarah"	The Bablake Sessions	with Jon Allen
2012	"Restless Farewell"	Chimes of Freedom: The Songs of Bob Dylan	Bob Dylan cover

=== Unreleased ===
- "Theme Music" - In Private in Public: The Prince and Princess of Wales soundtrack
- "Get Busy" and "The Other Side of the Moon" - Hooves of Fire

== Production and session work ==
=== as producer ===
- Infidels (1983) by Bob Dylan. Although Knopfler disowned the reworked version of the album as released, his production is still noticeable. Left off the album, but later released on The Bootleg Series, is the critically acclaimed "Blind Willie McTell", featuring only Dylan, singing and playing piano, accompanied by Knopfler on acoustic guitar.
- Knife (1984) by Aztec Camera. This Scottish indie/new wave band was mostly a vehicle for the work of Roddy Frame, much as Dire Straits only ever recorded Mark Knopfler compositions.
- Miracle (1987) by Willy DeVille. The album was dedicated to Knopfler and his wife "for their support which was nothing short of a Miracle in a time of Dire Straits." The album ends with the ballad "Storybook Love", the theme from The Princess Bride.
- Land of Dreams (1988) by Randy Newman. Knopfler produced seven of the album's twelve tracks. The album includes the single "It's Money that Matters", which revisits the Dire Straits song "Money for Nothing".
- The Sailor's Revenge (2012) by Bap Kennedy was recorded at British Grove Studios in 2011.

=== as session musician ===
The following contain guitar performances or guest appearances by Knopfler.

- Oh What a Feeling by Mavis Staples (1979)
- "Gotta Serve Somebody"/"Trouble in Mind" by Bob Dylan (1979)
- Slow Train Coming by Bob Dylan (1979)
- Sandy McLelland & the Backline by Sandy McLelland (1979)
- "King's Call" from Solo in Soho by Phil Lynott (1980)
- "Time Out of Mind" from Gaucho by Steely Dan (1980)
- Beautiful Vision by Van Morrison (1982)
- "Ode to Liberty (The Protest Song) from The Philip Lynott Album by Phil Lynott (1982)
- "Love Over and Over" from Love Over and Over by Kate & Anna McGarrigle (1982)
- "Madonna's Daughter" from Release by David Knopfler (1983)
- Phil Everly by Phil Everly (1983)
- Infidels by Bob Dylan (1983)
- "Blanket Roll Blues" from Climate of Hunter by Scott Walker (1984)
- Never Told a Soul by John Illsley (1984)
- "She Means Something to Me" from The Rock Connection by Cliff Richard (1984)
- "Valentine" from Boys and Girls by Bryan Ferry (1985)
- Stay Tuned by Chet Atkins (1985)
- Break Every Rule by Tina Turner (1986)
- "They Dance Alone (Cueco Solo)" from ...Nothing Like the Sun by Sting (1987)
- "The Game of Love" from Primitive Dance by Paul Brady (1987)
- Sails by Chet Atkins (1987)
- Soldier of Fortune by Thin Lizzy (1987)
- Save the Last Dance for Me by Ben E. King (1987)
- Let It Be by Ferry Aid (1987)
- Prince's Trust 10th anniversary Birthday Party (1987)
- The Secret Policeman's Third Ball (The Music) (1987)
- "Imagine" from C.G.P. by Chet Atkins (1988)
- "Death Is Not the End"Down in the Groove by Bob Dylan (1988)
- The Shouting Stage by Joan Armatrading (1988)
- Land of Dreams by Randy Newman (1988)
- Glass by John Illsley (1988)
- Under Milk Wood (A Play For Voices) by Dylan Thomas (1988)
- The Booze Brothers by Brewers Droop (1989, recorded 1973)
- "Water of Love" from River of Time by The Judds (1989)
- Brendan Croker & the Five O'Clock Shadows by Brendan Croker (1989)
- EP by Brendan Croker & the Five O'Clock Shadows (1989)
- "Money for Nothing/Beverly Hillbillies" from UHF – Original Motion Picture Soundtrack and Other Stuff by Weird Al Yankovic (1989)
- "Foreign Affair" from Foreign Affair by Tina Turner (1989)
- "I Think That I Love You Too Much" from Hell to Pay by Jeff Healey (1990)
- Knebworth: The Album (1990)
- "All Is Fair in Love and War" from Back to the Grindstone by Ronnie Milsap (1991)
- "Voices That Care" (1991)
- The Great Indoors by Brendan Croker (1991)
- The Bootleg Series Volumes 1–3, 1961–1991 by Bob Dylan (1991)
- "Where Is the Next One Coming From? from Damn Right, I've Got the Blues by Buddy Guy (1991)
- Shadowdance by Chris White (1991)
- Sneakin' Around by Chet Atkins (1992)
- "When It Comes to You" from Seminole Wind by John Anderson (1992)
- Dulcimer Sessions by David Schnaufer (1992)
- Ain't I a Woman by Rory Block (1992)
- Heartbeat by Hank Marvin (1993)
- "Wonderful Land"/"Nivram" by Hank Marvin (1993)
- Beloved One by Dee Carstensen (1993)
- Don't Fall Apart on Me Tonight by Aaron Neville (1993)
- Flyer by Nanci Griffith (1994)
- "White Lightnin'" from The Bradley Barn Sessions by George Jones (1994)
- Read My Licks by Chet Atkins (1994)
- The Kershaw Sessions by Brendan Croker (1995)
- Long Black Veil by The Chieftains (1995)
- South of I-10 by Sonny Landreth (1995)
- Big River by Jimmy Nail (1995)
- Just Pickin' by Steve Phillips (1996)
- "Let the Guitar Do the Talkin'" from Paradise by John Anderson (1996)
- "The Way I Should" from The Way I Should by Iris DeMent (1996)
- Throw These Guns Away + Knockin' On Heaven's Door (Dunblane tribute record) (1996)
- "Ode to Chet" from Nothin' but the Taillights by Clint Black (1997)
- Music for Montserrat (1998)
- Closing in on the Fire by Waylon Jennings (1998)
- "Oh, Lonesome Me" for Mary Chapin Carpenter from Tribute to Tradition (various) (1998)
- The Piper's Call by Liam O'Flynn (1999)
- The Austin Sessions by Kris Kristofferson (1999)
- Another World by Gerry Rafferty (2000)
- Prince's Trust 10th Anniversary Birthday Party (2000)
- Buried Treasures, Vol. 3 by Lindisfarne (2000)
- Human by Rod Stewart (2001)
- "Don't Be Cruel" for Bryan Ferry from Good Rockin' Tonight: The Legacy of Sun Records by (various) (2001)
- Jools Holland's Big Band Rhythm & Blues by Jools Holland (2002)
- Lost & Found by Lee Fardon (2002)
- Parallel Tracks by the Royal Scots Dragoon Guards (2003)
- Double Shot Rocks by Alan Merrill (2003)
- Nobody's Here Anymore from Deja Vu All Over Again by John Fogerty (2004)
- Is It Rolling Bob? A Reggae Tribute to Bob Dylan (2004)
- Just for a Thrill by Bill Wyman's Rhythm Kings (2004)
- Sea Fever by William Topley (2004)
- B. B. King & Friends: 80 by B.B. King (2005)
- "Who Will the Next Fool Be?" from Zu & Co. - The Ultimate Duets Collection by Zucchero (2005)
- Prairie Home Companion Duets (2006)
- East to West by Paul Burch (2006)
- Take the Weather with You by Jimmy Buffett (2006)
- Uncovered by Tony Joe White (2006)
- After Midnight Live by Eric Clapton (2007)
- "Love Song" from ...Earth to the Dandy Warhols... by The Dandy Warhols (2008, dobro)
- Burning Your Playhouse Down by George Jones (2008)
- "Blue Tarp Blues" from From the Reach by Sonny Landreth (2008)
- Inamorata by Guy Fletcher (2008)
- Life Goes On by Gerry Rafferty (2009)
- Greatest and Latest: Just a Thrill and Live by Bill Wyman (2009)
- Live at Knebworth (2010)
- Streets of Heaven by John Illsley (2010)
- Just Across the River by Jimmy Webb (2010)
- Chet Atkins Certified Guitar Player concert-tribute to Chet Atkins (2010)
- Mercury by Pieta Brown (2011)
- Gathering by Diane Schuur (2011)
- Freak Flag by Greg Brown (2011)
- Back Pages by America (2011)
- "17 Hills" from A Map of the Floating City by Thomas Dolby (2011)
- Memories of My Trip by Chris Barber (2011)
- 's too much by Bo Walton (2011)
- "What a Wonderful World" from Impressions by Chris Botti (2012)
- Waiting on a Dream by Bo Walton (2012)
- Slightly Above Below Average - A Tribute to Chet Atkins by His Friends (2012)
- Angels Without Wings by Heidi Talbot (2013)
- These Wilder Things by Ruth Moody (2013)
- "Oldest Surfer on the Beach" from Songs from St. Somewhere by Jimmy Buffett (2013)
- The Breeze: An Appreciation of JJ Cale by Eric Clapton & Friends (2014)
- "What's Broken" from Croz by David Crosby (2014)
- 24 Karat Gold - Songs from the Vault by Stevie Nicks (2014)
- "Lost" on Avonmore by Bryan Ferry (2014)
- If This Was a Dream by Susan Ashton (2015)
- The Vicar St. Sessions Vol. 1 by Paul Brady (2015)
- "Diamond Joe" from Before This World (deluxe edition) by James Taylor (2015)
- Devil Music by Randall Bramblett (2015)
- "Let It Die" from Delirium (deluxe edition) by Ellie Goulding (2015)
- Shadowing John Barry by Brian Bennett (2016)
- Black Cat by Zucchero (2016)
- Postcards by Pieta Brown (2017)
- Waiting on a Song by Dan Auerbach (2017)
- "Have All the Songs Been Written?" from Wonderful Wonderful by The Killers (2017)
- Accomplice One by Tommy Emmanuel (2018)
- Freeway by Pieta Brown (2019)
- "Dancing Girl" from Stomping Ground by Dion (2021)

== Videography ==
=== Video albums ===
Title	Video details
A Night in London	Released: 1996; Label: PolyGram Music Video; Formats: VHS, Laserdisc, DVD
Crossroads - Live 1988 (with Eric Clapton)	Released: 2005; Label: Movieplay, Columbia Music Entertainment; Format: DVD
Real Live Roadrunning	Released: 2006; Label: Mercury, Universal Music, Warner Bros.; Format: DVD
Live in Berlin 2007	Released: 2012; Label: Pelo Music; Format: DVD

=== Music videos ===
Year	Title	Director	Album
1983	"Going Home: Theme of the Local Hero"		Local Hero
1990	"Poor Boy Blues" (feat. Chet Atkins)	David Hogan	non-album
1991	"Voices That Care" (various)	David S. Jackson	non-album
1996	"Darling Pretty"		Golden Heart
1996	"Cannibals"		Golden Heart
1996	"Golden Heart"		Golden Heart
2000	"What It Is"		Sailing to Philadelphia
2002	"Why Aye Man"		The Ragpicker's Dream
2004	"Boom, Like That"		Shangri-La
2004	"Everybody Pays"		Shangri-La
2004	"Whoop De Doo"		Shangri-La
2004	"Summer of Love"		Shangri-La
2007	"True Love Will Never Fade"		Kill to Get Crimson
2009	"Cleaning My Gun"		Get Lucky
2015	"Wherever I Go" (feat. Ruth Moody)		Tracker
2018	"Good on You Son"		Down the Road Wherever
2024	"Ahead of the Game"		One Deep River
2024	"Going Home (Theme from Local Hero)" (with Mark Knopfler's Guitar Heroes)	Electric Theatre Collective	non-album
2024	"Two Pairs of Hands"		One Deep River
2024	"All Comers"		The Boy
