= Sailing to Philadelphia =

Studio album by Mark Knopfler
- Released: 25 September 2000
- Recorded: 1998–2000
- Studio: Ocean Way, Nashville; Tracking Room, Nashville
- Genre: Roots rock; folk rock; blues
- Length: 60:11 (International); 60:25 (USA)
- Label: Mercury; Warner Bros. (USA)
- Producer: Mark Knopfler, Chuck Ainlay

Mark Knopfler chronology
Metroland (1999)	Sailing to Philadelphia (2000)	A Shot at Glory (2002)

Sailing to Philadelphia is the second solo studio album by British singer-songwriter and guitarist Mark Knopfler, released on 25 September 2000 by Vertigo Records internationally, and by Warner Bros. Records in the United States. The album contains featured vocal performances by James Taylor, Van Morrison, and Chris Difford and Glenn Tilbrook of Squeeze.

The title track is drawn from Mason & Dixon by Thomas Pynchon, a novel about Charles Mason and Jeremiah Dixon, the two English surveyors who established the border separating Pennsylvania and Delaware from Maryland and Virginia in the 1760s. This border later became known as the Mason–Dixon line and has been used since the 1820s to denote the border between the Southern United States and the Northern United States.

== Critical reception ==
Professional ratings
Review scores
Source	Rating
AllMusic	3/5 stars
Rolling Stone	3.5/5 stars

In his review for AllMusic, William Ruhlmann gave the album three out of five stars, writing that "in one song after another on this album, you get the feeling that he started out playing some familiar song in a specific genre and eventually extrapolated upon it enough to call it an original." In his review for Rolling Stone magazine, David Wild gave the album three and a half out of five stars, writing that the album is "a welcome flashback" to Knopfler's earlier work with Dire Straits. Wild continued

Knopfler duets with James Taylor on the title track, which deftly explores the relationship between Mason and Dixon; Van Morrison trades lines on the soulful "The Last Laugh." With Sailing to Philadelphia, Knopfler has taken a break from the rootsy side projects and soundtrack work that have occupied him for the past 17 years, and has evoked some of the grandeur of prime Dire Straits.

By 2002, the album had sold more than 3.5 million copies worldwide. In some territories—Western Europe for example—the album was released as an HDCD and a 5.1 Surround Sound DVD-A.

== Touring ==
In 2001, Knopfler supported the release of the album with his Sailing to Philadelphia Tour, which started on 27 March 2001 in Mexico City, Mexico, included 80 concerts in 68 cities, and ended on 31 July 2001 in Moscow, Russia. The tour consisted of three legs: Mexico and South America, North America, and Europe and Russia. The tour lineup included Mark Knopfler (guitar, vocals), Guy Fletcher (keyboards), Richard Bennett (guitar), Glenn Worf (bass), Chad Cromwell (drums), Geraint Watkins (piano, accordion), and Mike Henderson (guitar, mandolin, violin, harmonica).

The Madrid concert on 2 July 2001 was filmed but never released. The Toronto concert at Massey Hall on 3 May 2001 was also recorded, but only four tracks were officially released: "Speedway At Nazareth" (the B-side of "Why Aye Man"), "Who's Your Baby Now" (the B-side of "Boom, Like That"), "Sailing to Philadelphia" and "Brothers in Arms" (both available on a limited-edition version of the album The Ragpicker's Dream).

== Track listing ==
All songs were written by Mark Knopfler.

International version (Note: The standard Mercury international release has thirteen tracks as shown. The Mercury/Universal Distribution release has fourteen tracks and includes the bonus song "Do America" as track 6.)

No.	Title	Length
1.	"What It Is"	4:57
2.	"Sailing to Philadelphia" (featuring James Taylor)	5:29
3.	"Who's Your Baby Now"	3:05
4.	"Baloney Again"	5:09
5.	"The Last Laugh" (featuring Van Morrison)	3:22
6.	"Silvertown Blues"	5:32
7.	"El Macho"	5:29
8.	"Prairie Wedding"	4:26
9.	"Wanderlust"	3:52
10.	"Speedway at Nazareth"	6:23
11.	"Junkie Doll"	4:34
12.	"Sands of Nevada"	3:56
13.	"One More Matinee"	3:57
Total length:		60:11

United States version
(including Spotify, Apple Music, Amazon Music and other digital platforms)

No.	Title	Length
1.	"What It Is"	4:57
2.	"Sailing to Philadelphia" (featuring James Taylor)	5:29
3.	"Who's Your Baby Now"	3:05
4.	"Baloney Again"	5:09
5.	"The Last Laugh" (featuring Van Morrison)	3:22
6.	"Do America"	4:11
7.	"El Macho"	5:29
8.	"Prairie Wedding"	4:26
9.	"Wanderlust"	3:52
10.	"Speedway at Nazareth"	6:23
11.	"Junkie Doll"	4:34
12.	"Silvertown Blues"	5:32
13.	"Sands of Nevada"	3:56
Total length:		60:25

== Personnel ==
- Mark Knopfler – vocals, guitar
- Richard Bennett – guitar
- Jim Cox – piano, Hammond organ
- Guy Fletcher – keyboards, backing vocals
- Glenn Worf – bass guitar
- Chad Cromwell – drums
- Danny Cummings – percussion
- Paul Franklin – pedal steel guitar, lap steel guitar
- Frank Ricotti – marimba
- Aubrey Haynie – violin (1,10)
- Jim Hoke – autoharp, harmonica
- Wayne Jackson – trumpet
- Mike Haynes – flugelhorn
- Harvey Thompson – tenor saxophone
- Jim Horn – baritone saxophone, tenor saxophone
- James Taylor – vocals (2)
- Van Morrison – vocals (5)
- Gillian Welch and David Rawlings – vocals (8,10)
- Glenn Tilbrook and Chris Difford – vocals (International 6)
- Duane Starling – vocals
- Gillian Welch – vocals
- Chris Willis – vocals

Production

- Mark Knopfler – producer
- Chuck Ainlay – producer, engineer, mixing
- Chubba Petocz – engineer
- Jon Bailey – assistant engineer
- Graham Lewis – assistant
- Mark Ralston – assistant
- Aaron Swihart – assistant
- Denny Purcell – mastering
- Jonathan Russell – mastering assistant
- Andrew Williams – portrait photography
- Eric Conn – editing
- Sandy Choron – art direction
- Harry Choron – design
- Jose Molina – photography (front cover)
- James Gritz – photography (back cover)
- Andrew Williams – photography (portrait)
- Ben Mikaelsen – photography (additional)

== Charts ==
=== Weekly ===
Chart (2000)	Peak position
Australian Albums (ARIA)	16
Austrian Albums (Ö3 Austria)	2
Belgian Albums (Ultratop Flanders)	4
Belgian Albums (Ultratop Wallonia)	10
Danish Albums (Hitlisten)	3
Dutch Albums (Album Top 100)	2
Finnish Albums (Suomen virallinen lista)	3
French Albums (SNEP)	7
German Albums (Offizielle Top 100)	1
Hungarian Albums (MAHASZ)	12
Irish Albums (IRMA)	19
Italian Albums (FIMI)	1
New Zealand Albums (RMNZ)	11
Norwegian Albums (VG-lista)	1
Polish Albums (ZPAV)	9
Spanish Albums (PROMUSICAE)	2
Swedish Albums (Sverigetopplistan)	2
Swiss Albums (Schweizer Hitparade)	1
UK Albums (OCC)	4
US Billboard 200	60

Chart (2025)	Peak position
German Albums (Offizielle Top 100)	30
German Rock & Metal Albums (Offizielle Top 100)	12

=== Year-end ===
Chart (2000)	Position
Australian Albums (ARIA)	100
Austrian Albums (Ö3 Austria)	46
Belgian Albums (Ultratop Flanders)	44
Belgian Albums (Ultratop Wallonia)	57
Canadian Albums (Nielsen SoundScan)	177
Danish Albums (Hitlisten)	14
Dutch Albums (MegaCharts)	10
European Albums (Music & Media)	21
French Albums (SNEP)	29
German Albums (Offizielle Top 100)	26
Swedish Albums (Sverigetopplistan)	11
Swiss Albums (Schweizer Hitparade)	18

Chart (2001)	Position
Belgian Albums (Ultratop Wallonia)	98
Danish Albums (Hitlisten)	98
Dutch Albums (MegaCharts)	10
European Albums (Music & Media)	40
French Albums (SNEP)	125
German Albums (Offizielle Top 100)	62
Swiss Albums (Schweizer Hitparade)	93

== Certifications ==
Region	Certification	Certified units/sales
Australia (ARIA)	Gold	35,000^{^}
Austria (IFPI Austria)	Gold	25,000^{*}
Belgium (BRMA)	Platinum	50,000^{*}
Canada (Music Canada)	Gold	50,000^{^}
Denmark (IFPI Danmark)	2× Platinum	100,000^{^}
Finland (Musiikkituottajat)	Gold	33,786
Germany (BVMI)	Platinum	300,000^{^}
Netherlands (NVPI)	5× Platinum	400,000^{^}
New Zealand (RMNZ)	Gold	7,500^{^}
Norway (IFPI Norway)	3× Platinum	150,000^{*}
Spain (Promusicae)	Platinum	100,000^{^}
Sweden (GLF)	Platinum	80,000^{^}
Switzerland (IFPI Switzerland)	Platinum	50,000^{^}
United Kingdom (BPI)	Gold	100,000^{^}
United States (RIAA)	Gold	500,000^{^}
Summaries
Europe (IFPI)	2× Platinum	2,000,000^{*}
^{*} Sales figures based on certification alone.^{^} Shipments figures based on certification alone.
