= Boom, Like That =

2004 single by Mark Knopfler, based on Ray Kroc's business tactics

Single by Mark Knopfler

from the album Shangri-La
- B-side: Summer of Love; Who's Your Baby Now (live)
- Released: 20 September 2004
- Genre: Roots rock
- Label: Mercury
- Songwriter: Mark Knopfler
- Producers: Mark Knopfler, Chuck Ainlay

Mark Knopfler singles chronology
"Why Aye Man" (2002)	"Boom, Like That" (2004)	"The Trawlerman's Song EP" (2005)

"Boom, Like That" is a 2004 single by Mark Knopfler, from his album Shangri-La. It is – with "Darling Pretty" – one of only two Mark Knopfler solo singles to reach the UK Top 40, reaching no. 34.

== Lyrics ==
The subject of the song is Ray Kroc, who is credited with the growth of McDonald's after buying out the McDonalds brothers. Knopfler indicated that he was inspired by Kroc's autobiography.

== Track listings ==
=== CD single ===
1. "Boom, Like That"
2. "Summer of Love"

=== Maxi CD single ===
1. "Boom, Like That"
2. "Summer of Love"
3. "Who's Your Baby Now" (live)

=== 7" ===
1. "Boom, Like That"
2. "Who's Your Baby Now" (live)
