= One Take Radio Sessions =

Compilation album by Mark Knopfler
- Released: 21 June 2005
- Recorded: 2004
- Studio: Shangri-La (Malibu)
- Genre: Roots rock, folk rock
- Length: 39:35
- Label: Mercury; Warner Bros. (USA)
- Producer: Mark Knopfler, Chuck Ainlay

Mark Knopfler chronology
The Trawlerman's Song (2005)	One Take Radio Sessions (2005)	Private Investigations (2005)

One Take Radio Sessions is a compilation of live-in-studio tracks by British singer-songwriter and guitarist Mark Knopfler, released on 21 June 2005 by Mercury Records internationally and Warner Bros. Records in the United States. The tracks were recorded in one take at Shangri-la Studios in Malibu, California. The record contains live in-studio versions of seven songs from the 2004 album Shangri-La and one song, "Rüdiger", from the album Golden Heart. This release is in fact an extended version of The Trawlerman's Song EP, featuring two more tracks and a revised version of the title track.

== Critical reception ==
Professional ratings
Review scores
Source	Rating
AllMusic	2/5 stars

In his review for AllMusic, James Christopher Monger gave the record two out of five stars. Although Monger thought "the playing is top-notch, the recording impeccable, and the tunes are strong", he felt that the release offered nothing new that had not been previously delivered on the 2004 album Shangri-La.

== Track listing ==
All songs were written by Mark Knopfler.

No.	Title	Length
1.	"The Trawlerman's Song"	5:13
2.	"Back to Tupelo"	4:32
3.	"Song for Sonny Liston"	5:30
4.	"Rüdiger"	6:07
5.	"Boom, Like That"	4:35
6.	"Everybody Pays"	6:10
7.	"Donegan's Gone"	2:59
8.	"Stand Up Guy"	4:29
Total length:		39:35

== Personnel ==
Music

- Mark Knopfler – vocals, guitar
- Richard Bennett – guitar
- Jim Cox, Matt Rollings – keyboards
- Doug Pettibone – guitar (tracks 2 and 5), mandolin (track 8)
- Glenn Worf – bass guitar
- Chad Cromwell – drums

Production

- Mark Knopfler – producer
- Chuck Ainlay – producer, engineer
- Rodney Pearson – digital editing
- Bob Ludwig – mastering

== Charts ==
Chart performance for "One Take Radio Sessions"
Chart (2025)	Peak position
Croatian International Albums (HDU)	6
