= List of roots rock bands and musicians =

Roots rock is "a style of rock music that draws material from various American musical traditions including country, blues, and folk." The term is sometimes used in a broader sense to encompass other genres of Americana, including early rock and roll, country rock, and other related forms.

This list includes performers who have been associated with "roots rock" by music reviewers, music historians, or music journalists:

Contents
0–9 A B C D E F G H I J K L M N O P R S T U V W X Y Z

== A ==
- Alabama Shakes
- The Allman Brothers Band
- Dave Alvin
- Amazing Rhythm Aces
- Eric Ambel
- Jill Andrews

== B ==
- Badlees
- The Band
- The Black Crowes
- The Blasters
- Blind Melon
- Blue Mountain
- Blue Rodeo
- BoDeans
- Bottle Rockets
- Bronze Radio Return

== C ==
- J.J. Cale
- Calexico
- Neko Case
- Chris Isaak
- Ry Cooder
- Counting Crows
- Cracker
- Creedence Clearwater Revival
- Sheryl Crow

== D ==
- Charlie Daniels
- Dawes
- The Del Fuegos
- The Del-Lords
- Dire Straits
- The Dirty Guv'nahs
- Bob Dylan

== E ==
- Eagles
- Steve Earle
- Kathleen Edwards
- Billy Eli

== F ==
- John Fogerty

== G ==
- The Georgia Satellites
- Giant Sand
- Golden Smog
- Grace Potter and the Nocturnals
- Grateful Dead

== H ==
- Ben Harper
- Heartsfield
- Hillstomp
- Hootie and the Blowfish

== J ==
- Sally Jaye
- Eilen Jewell
- John Butler Trio

== K ==
- Kansas
- Mark Knopfler

== L ==
- Larkin Poe
- The Legendary Shack Shakers
- Little Feat
- Los Lobos
- Lynyrd Skynyrd

== M ==
- Wolf Mail
- The Marshall Tucker Band
- The Mavericks
- Maxim Ludwig & The Santa Fe Seven
- John Mellencamp
- Buddy Miller
- Molly Hatchet
- Murder by Death

== P ==
- The Proclaimers

== R ==
- Bonnie Raitt
- Reckless Kelly
- Lee Rocker
- Calvin Russell

== S ==
- Doug Sahm
- Bob Seger
- Brian Setzer
- The Silos
- Skydiggers
- Son Volt
- Steve Miller Band
- The Steepwater Band
- Swinging Steaks
- The Subdudes
- The Swearengens

== T ==
- Tom Petty and the Heartbreakers
- The Traveling Wilburys

== U ==
- Uncle Tupelo

== W ==
- The Wallflowers
- Webb Wilder
- Chris Whitley
- Wilco
- Willard Grant Conspiracy
- Link Wray

== Y ==
- Neil Young

== Z ==
- ZZ Top

== See also ==
- Southern rock
- Heartland rock
