= Devil Gets Her Way =

Studio album by The Swearengens
- Released: June 30, 2012
- Genres: Country, alternative country, americana, country rock, roots rock
- Length: 18:38

The Swearengens chronology
Devil Gets Her Way (2012)	Waiting On The Sunrise (2013)

Devil Gets Her Way is the debut studio album by The Swearengens, released in 2012. It was named one of "Seattle's Best Country Albums of 2012" by Seattle Weekly.

== Track listing ==
All songs written by Fredd Luongo.

No.	Title	Length
1.	"For Awhile"	2:51
2.	"If I Remain"	3:07
3.	"Bloody Gloves"	3:07
4.	"Out Of The Rain"	3:13
5.	"Devil Gets Her Way"	2:35
6.	"Eyes Of An Angel"	3:45

=== Production ===
- Steven Burnett, Fredd Luongo, Corey Knafelz – recording
- Scott Colburn (Gravelvoice) – drum & bass tracking
- Johnny Sangster (Avast) – mixing
- Ed Brooks (RFI) – mastering
- Liz Moody – cover art
- Christi Williford – cover design

== See also ==
- 2012 in music
