= The Trawlerman's Song =

EP by Mark Knopfler
- Released: 26 April 2005
- Recorded: Shangri-La Studios, Malibu, February 2004
- Genre: Roots rock, folk rock
- Length: 27:11
- Label: Mercury
- Producer: Mark Knopfler, Chuck Ainlay

Mark Knopfler chronology
Shangri-La (2004)	The Trawlerman's Song (2005)	One Take Radio Sessions (2005)

The Trawlerman's Song is an EP by British singer-songwriter and guitarist Mark Knopfler, released on 26 April 2005 by Mercury Records. The EP contains the album version of "The Trawlerman's Song" from the 2004 album Shangri-La and live in-studio versions of five other songs recorded in one take at Shangri-la Studios in Malibu, California.

== Track listing ==
All songs were written by Mark Knopfler.

No.	Title	Length
1.	"The Trawlerman's Song" (album version)	5:02
2.	"Back to Tupelo"	4:32
3.	"Song for Sonny Liston"	5:30
4.	"Boom, Like That"	4:35
5.	"Donegan's Gone"	2:59
6.	"Stand Up Guy"	4:30
Total length:		27:08

== Personnel ==
Music

- Mark Knopfler – vocals, guitars
- Richard Bennett – guitars
- Jim Cox – keyboards
- Matt Rollings – keyboards
- Doug Pettibone – guitar (2,5), mandolin (8)
- Glenn Worf – bass
- Chad Cromwell – drums

Production

- Mark Knopfler – producer
- Chuck Ainlay – producer, engineer
- Rodney Pearson – digital editing
- Bob Ludwig – mastering

== Charts ==
Chart (2005)	Peak position
Spain (PROMUSICAE)	1
