= Shangri-La (Mark Knopfler album) =

Studio album by Mark Knopfler
- Released: 28 September 2004
- Recorded: February 2004
- Studios: Shangri-La, Malibu
- Genres: Roots rock, country folk, blues
- Length: 66:14
- Labels: Mercury; Warner Bros. (USA)
- Producers: Mark Knopfler, Chuck Ainlay

Mark Knopfler chronology
The Ragpicker's Dream (2002)	Shangri-La (2004)	The Trawlerman's Song (2005)

Shangri-La is the fourth solo studio album by British singer-songwriter and guitarist Mark Knopfler, released on 28 September 2004 by Mercury Records internationally and Warner Bros. Records in the United States. Shangri-La received generally favorable reviews.

== Background ==
In March 2003, Knopfler was involved in a motorbike crash in Grosvenor Road, Belgravia, and suffered a broken collarbone, broken shoulder blade, and seven broken ribs. The planned Ragpicker's Dream Tour was subsequently cancelled. Knopfler spent seven months away from the guitar in physiotherapy, but eventually recovered and was able to return to the studio in 2004 for his fourth album and supporting tour the following year.

== Recording ==
Shangri-La was recorded in February 2004 at Shangri-La Studios in Malibu, California.

== Composition ==
The album features Knopfler's signature storytelling style of songwriting. The album's first single, "Boom, Like That", was inspired by Ray Kroc's autobiography, Grinding It Out, and the starting of McDonald's, using many of Mr. Kroc's exact words. "Song for Sonny Liston" is a song about the famous boxer, Sonny Liston. "Donegan's Gone" is about Scottish musician and singer Lonnie Donegan. "5.15 AM" tells the story of the 1967 "one-armed bandit murder". "Back to Tupelo" is about the life of Elvis Presley and his acting career. The album was released on LP, HDCD and in 5.1 Surround Sound on Super Audio CD (SACD) and DVD-Audio.

== Touring ==
Knopfler supported the release of Shangri-La with the Shangri-La Tour, which consisted of three legs: South Africa, Asia, Australia, and New Zealand; Europe; and North America. The tour started on 28 February 2005 in Johannesburg, South Africa, and included 104 concerts in 95 cities, ending on 31 July 2005 in Vancouver, British Columbia, Canada. The tour included a five-night run at the Royal Albert Hall in London. The tour lineup included Mark Knopfler (guitar, vocals), Guy Fletcher (keyboards), Richard Bennett (guitar), Matt Rollings (piano), Glenn Worf (bass), and Chad Cromwell (drums).

== Critical reception ==
Professional ratings
Aggregate scores
Source	Rating
Metacritic	65/100
Review scores
Source	Rating
AllMusic	3.5/5 stars
The Music Box	4/5 stars
MusicTap	4/5 stars
Rolling Stone	3.5/5 stars

Shangri-La received generally favorable reviews. In his review for AllMusic, James Christopher Monger gave the album three and a half out of five stars, noting that on this album, Knopfler abandoned the British folk and Celtic-influenced pop that populated his earlier solo albums and chose instead a "full-blown yet quiet and considerate collection of country-folk ballads and bluesy, midtempo dirges that revel in their uncharacteristic sparseness." Instead of writing about his brush with mortality—the wry "Don't Crash the Ambulance" aside—Knopfler uses his "warm baritone and effortless guitar work" to explore everything from the plight of the modern fisherman (on the beautiful and rustic "Trawlerman's Song"), to the entrepreneurial skills of McDonald's founder Ray Kroc (on "Boom, Like That"). Monger concludes:

Knopfler spent seven months away from the guitar in physiotherapy, but his melancholic slow-burn tone is as peat-smoked as ever, and his penchant for wrapping Americana-gothic folk around subjects that are uniquely English—colliers, cockneys, the one-armed bandit man who meets his maker in the atmospheric opener, "5:15 A.M."—is evident throughout. Dynamically, Shangri-La loses steam about three-quarters of the way through ... but Knopfler fans and lovers of Chet Atkins, Gordon Lightfoot, and J.J. Cale, as well as late-night poker players and early risers with an acerbic streak, will find much to love here.

In his review for The Music Box, John Metzger gave the album an "excellent" four out of five stars, writing that Knopfler has rarely sounded so relaxed and his arrangements so unassuming. Metzger continued:

His performance throughout the collection is impeccable, and beneath his subdued, folk-pop musings rests the loveliest batch of songs that he’s recorded since Love Over Gold. For the most part, the tunes on Shangri-La unfold slowly, blowing past like whispers in the wind ... The problem, then, is that ... Knopfler's many muted statements begin to blur together, and one becomes lost within his deep baritone as well as his sparse, ethereal accompaniments.

In his review for MusicTap, George Bennett gave the album four out of five stars, calling Knopfler's Shangri-La the "best album of his solo career". Bennett writes that Knopfler has produced "the most melodic, tasteful, laid-back yet wholly engrossing tunes" of his solo career. Bennett concluded that Shangri-La contains the best music and lyrics of Knopfler's solo career—the first album to "stand up solidly to anything Dire Straits did."

== Track listing ==
All songs were written by Mark Knopfler.

No.	Title	Length
1.	"5.15 A.M."	5:54
2.	"Boom, Like That"	5:49
3.	"Sucker Row"	4:56
4.	"The Trawlerman's Song"	5:02
5.	"Back to Tupelo"	4:31
6.	"Our Shangri-La"	5:41
7.	"Everybody Pays"	5:24
8.	"Song for Sonny Liston"	5:06
9.	"Whoop De Doo"	3:53
10.	"Postcards from Paraguay"	4:07
11.	"All That Matters"	3:08
12.	"Stand Up Guy"	4:32
13.	"Donegan's Gone"	3:05
14.	"Don't Crash the Ambulance"	5:06
Total length:		66:14

== Personnel ==
Music

- Mark Knopfler – vocals, guitars
- Richard Bennett – guitars
- Jim Cox – piano, organ, harmonica
- Guy Fletcher – piano, organ
- Glenn Worf – bass guitar
- Chad Cromwell – drums
- Paul Franklin – pedal steel guitar

Production

- Mark Knopfler – producer
- Chuck Ainlay – producer, engineer
- Guy Fletcher – engineer
- Rupert Coulson – assistant engineer
- Bob Ludwig – mastering

== Chart positions ==
=== Weekly charts ===
Chart (2004–2005)	Peak position
Australian Albums (ARIA)	69
Austrian Albums (Ö3 Austria)	14
Belgian Albums (Ultratop Flanders)	9
Belgian Albums (Ultratop Wallonia)	3
Danish Albums (Hitlisten)	4
Dutch Albums (Album Top 100)	4
Finnish Albums (Suomen virallinen lista)	10
French Albums (SNEP)	5
German Albums (Offizielle Top 100)	3
Greek Albums (IFPI)	28
Irish Albums (IRMA)	65
Italian Albums (FIMI)	4
Norwegian Albums (VG-lista)	1
Polish Albums (ZPAV)	15
Portuguese Albums (AFP)	21
Scottish Albums (Official Charts)	18
Swedish Albums (Sverigetopplistan)	3
Swiss Albums (Schweizer Hitparade)	7
UK Albums (Official Charts)	11
UK Physical Albums (OCC)	11
US Billboard 200	66

=== Year-end charts ===
Chart (2004)	Position
Belgian Albums (Ultratop Flanders)	85
Belgian Albums (Ultratop Wallonia)	81
Dutch Albums (Album Top 100)	48
French Albums (SNEP)	198
German Albums (Offizielle Top 100)	96
Swedish Albums (Sverigetopplistan)	82
Swiss Albums (Schweizer Hitparade)	89

== Certifications and sales ==
Region	Certification	Certified units/sales
Denmark (IFPI Danmark)	Gold	20,000^{^}
Germany (BVMI)	Gold	100,000^{^}
Switzerland (IFPI Switzerland)	Gold	20,000^{^}
United Kingdom (BPI)	Silver	60,000^{^}
United States	—	203,000
^{^} Shipments figures based on certification alone.
