= The Swearengens =

American alternative country band

- L to R: Soren Godbersen, Kirsten Ballweg, Fredd Luongo, Jeff Baars. Photo by Corey Knafelz

Background information
- Origin: Seattle, Washington, United States
- Genres: Country, Alternative country, Americana, Country rock, Roots rock
- Years active: 2010–present
- Members: Fredd Luongo; Soren Godbersen; Forrest Marowitz; Jesse Harmonson
- Past members: Kirsten Ballweg; Jeff Baars; Fred Slater; Fritz Marial; Brian Ochs; Nicole Clare
- Website: www.swearengens.com

The Swearengens are an American alternative country band formed in 2010 in Seattle.

== Background ==
The band consists of Fredd Luongo on vocals and guitar, Soren Godbersen on guitars and "Cadillacs, etc.", Forrest Marowitz on bass and backing vocals, and Jesse Harmonson on drums. All of their songs are written by frontman Fredd. They can often be found playing, and sipping a beverage, at places in Seattle like the Tractor Tavern, the Conor Byrne Pub and the Little Red Hen.

The band has been described as: "From epic road songs to tear-stained tales of heartache, from Texas-style rockers to dark-humored murder ballads, The Swearengens cover a lot of musical and emotional territory in their twisted attempt at reviving the glory days alt-country of Whiskeytown, The Jayhawks, Dwight Yoakam, Uncle Tupelo, and Steve Earle."

The band released their first album, Devil Gets Her Way, on June 30, 2012. It was named one of "Seattle's Best Country Albums of 2012" by Seattle Weekly. Their second album, Waiting On The Sunrise, was released on June 8, 2013. It was named one of the "Top Ten Albums of 2013" by Leigh Bezezekoff at KEXP. The band's most recent album, 'Merican Woman & Other Tales, was released on June 26, 2015.

Freddy self-released his first solo album I Dance To Forget on October 7, 2022, on the Shuksan Publishing label. The title track made the KEXP Swingin' Doors "Best of 2022" playlist.

== Discography ==
Year	Album
2012	Devil Gets Her Way
2013	Waiting On The Sunrise
2015	'Merican Woman & Other Tales
