= What It Is (Mark Knopfler song) =

2000 single by Mark Knopfler

Single by Mark Knopfler

from the album Sailing to Philadelphia
- B-side: "The Long Highway; "Let's See You; "Camerado"
- Released: 4 September 2000
- Length: 4:57 (album version); 3:33 (radio edit)
- Label: Mercury
- Songwriter: Mark Knopfler
- Producer: Mark Knopfler

Mark Knopfler singles chronology
"Rüdiger" (1996)	"What It Is" (2000)	"Sailing to Philadelphia" (2000)

"What It Is" is a song written and recorded by the British rock musician Mark Knopfler. It was released on 4 September 2000 as the lead single from his second solo studio album, Sailing to Philadelphia (2000). The song's lyrics pay homage to the city of Edinburgh, Scotland, making reference to Edinburgh Castle, the Stone of Scone and Canongate Tolbooth. An extended version of the song released in Mexico contains an additional verse. The song became a top-10 hit in Italy, Norway, Poland, Portugal and Spain, as well as on the US Billboard Triple-A chart.

== Track listing ==
No.	Title	Length
1.	"What It Is" (radio edit)	3:33
2.	"The Long Highway"	3:46
3.	"Let's See You"	4:21
4.	"Camerado"	2:58
Total length:		14:38

== Charts ==
=== Weekly charts ===
Chart (2000–2001)	Peak position
Belgium (Ultratip Bubbling Under Flanders)	11
Belgium (Ultratip Bubbling Under Wallonia)	15
Europe (Eurochart Hot 100)	81
France (SNEP)	56
Germany (GfK)	81
Italy (FIMI)	3
Netherlands (Single Top 100)	38
Norway (VG-lista)	10
Poland Airplay (Music & Media)	10
Poland (PiF PaF)	6
Portugal (AFP)	9
Spain (Promusicae)	4
Switzerland (Schweizer Hitparade)	38
US Adult Alternative Airplay (Billboard)	3

=== Year-end charts ===
Chart (2000)	Position
US Triple-A (Billboard)	31

Chart (2000)	Position
US Triple-A (Billboard)	13

== Release history ==
Region	Date	Format	Label	Ref.
United States	4 September 2000	Triple-A radio	Mercury	
Europe	18 September 2000	CD	Mercury	
United States	25 September 2000	Mainstream rock radio	Mercury	
