= Chad Cromwell =

American drummer

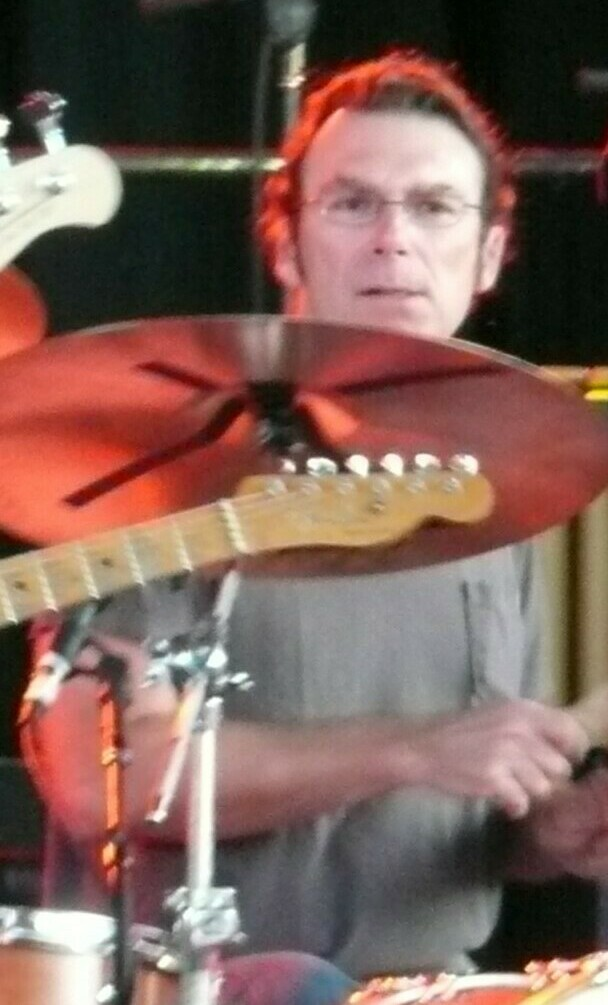
- Cromwell in 2009

Background information
- Born: June 14, 1957 (age 69); Paducah, Kentucky, U.S.
- Genres: Rock; country
- Occupation: Drummer
- Years active: 1986–present

Chad Cromwell (born June 14, 1957) is an American rock drummer whose music career has spanned more than 30 years. He is the founding member of a band called Fortunate Sons, which released a self-titled album in 2004.

Cromwell has worked with multiple prominent artists from various genres, including Neil Young, Mark Knopfler, Joe Walsh, Joss Stone, Bonnie Raitt, and Crosby, Stills, and Nash.

== Early life ==
Cromwell was born on June 14, 1957, in Paducah, Kentucky. When he was three years old he moved with his parents and siblings to Memphis, Tennessee in 1960. In 1970, he moved to Nashville, Tennessee, and remained there for the rest of his childhood.

He started playing drums at the age of eight, wearing headphones as he played along to records in an upstairs room of his parents' home. By the age of twelve he was playing in garage bands in the local neighborhood.

== Career ==
Cromwell started recording and touring with Joe Walsh in 1986, appearing on two albums, Got Any Gum? and Ordinary Average Guy.

In 1987, Cromwell began a collaboration with songwriter Neil Young. The initial sessions became Neil Young & The Bluenotes. Since then he has recorded and toured with Young on several occasions, and appears on albums such as Freedom (1989), Prairie Wind (2005) Living with War (2006) and Chrome Dreams II (2007). He has also appeared in Heart of Gold, a documentary capturing the debut of Neil Young's album, Prairie Wind (along with other Young classics). This was filmed at the Ryman auditorium and directed by Jonathan Demme.

Cromwell is also known for his contributions to Mark Knopfler's solo albums Golden Heart (1996), Sailing to Philadelphia (2000), The Ragpicker's Dream (2002) and Shangri-La (2004). He was also part of Knopfler's band during the tours of his first solo albums.

Cromwell toured with Crosby, Stills, Nash & Young in the summer of 2006.

He has also worked with many other artists including Dave Stewart, Vince Gill, Amy Grant, Lady Antebellum, Diana Krall, Willie Nelson, Jackson Browne, Boz Scaggs, Wynonna, Trisha Yearwood, Miranda Lambert, Bonnie Raitt, Peter Frampton, Allison Moorer, Chris Knight, Joss Stone, Rodney Crowell, Marty Stuart, and Stevie Nicks.

In the mid-2000s, Cromwell formed the band Fortunate Sons along with Michael Rhodes, Gary Nicholson, Kenny Greenberg, and Reese Wynans. They released a self-titled album in 2004. He is also a member of the occasional touring band, Big Al Anderson and The Balls, led by former NRBQ guitarist Al Anderson.

In 2012, he appeared on The Beach Boys' studio album entitled That's Why God Made the Radio. In 2013, he was featured on Bonnie Tyler's album, Rocks and Honey.

In 2014, he provided drums on Drake Bell's third studio album, Ready Steady Go!

== Personal life ==
He lives in both Nashville and Los Angeles with his wife, Windy.

== Collaborations ==
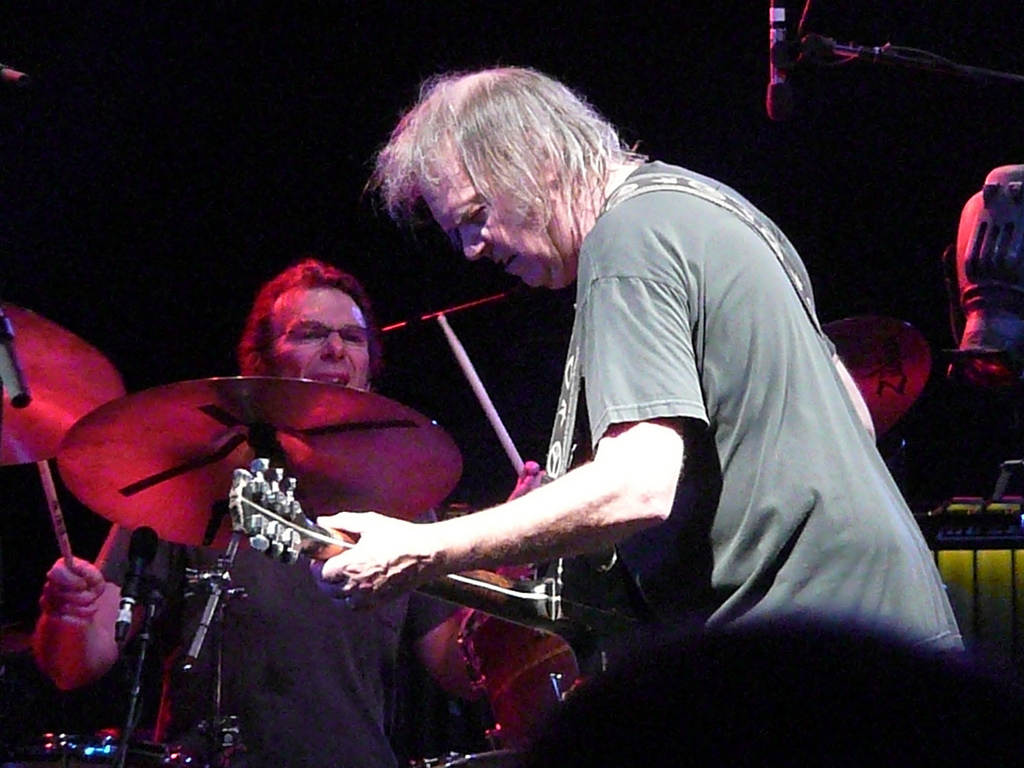
Cromwell (background) performing live with Neil Young in 2009

With Trace Adkins

- Love Will... (Show-Dog Universal, 2013)

With Gary Allan

- It Would Be You (Decca Records, 1998)
- Smoke Rings in the Dark (MCA Records, 1999)
- Alright Guy (MCA Records, 2001)
- See if I Care (MCA Records, 2003)
- Tough All Over (MCA Records, 2005)
- Living Hard (MCA Records, 2007)
- Get Off on the Pain (MCA Records, 2010)
- Set You Free (MCA Records, 2013)

With Lady Antebellum

- Lady Antebellum (Capitol Records, 2008)
- Need You Now (Capitol Records, 2010)
- Own the Night (Capitol Records, 2011)
- Golden (Capitol Records, 2013)

With Katie Armiger

- Believe (Cold River Records, 2008)
- Fall Into Me (Cold River Records, 2013)

With Sweet Pea Atkinson

- Get What You Deserve (Blue Note, 2017)

With Joan Baez

- Play Me Backwards (Virgin Records, 1992)
- Gone from Danger (Guardian, 1997)

With The Beach Boys

- That's Why God Made the Radio (Capitol Records, 2012)

With Drake Bell

- Ready Steady Go! (Warner Bros. Records, 2014)

With Dierks Bentley

- Gravel & Gold (Capitol Records, 2023)
- Broken Branches (Capitol Records, 2025)

With Matraca Berg

- Sunday Morning to Sunday Night (Rising Tride Records, 1997)

With Michael Bolton

- All That Matters (Columbia Records, 1997)

With Joe Bonamassa

- Dust Bowl (J&R Adventures, 2011)

With Danielle Bradbery

- Danielle Bradbery (Big Machine Records, 2013)

With Lee Brice

- I Don't Dance (Curb Records, 2014)

With Kix Brooks

- New to This Town (Arista Records, 2012)

With Brooks & Dunn

- Cowboy Town (Arista Records, 2007)

With Pieta Brown

- Remember the Sun (One Little Independent Records, 2007)
- Mercury (Red House Records, 2011)
- Postcards (Lustre Records, 2017)

With Billy Burnette

- Rock & Roll With It (Rock & Roll With It Records, 2011)

With Shawn Camp

- Fireball (Skeeterbit, 2006)

With Mary Chapin Carpenter

- Between Here and Gone (Columbia Records, 2004)

With Paul Carrack

- I Know That Name (Carrack UK, 2008)

With Jeff Carson

- Jeff Carson (Curb Records, 1995)

With Beth Nielsen Chapman

- Uncovered (BNC Records, 2014)

With Steven Curtis Chapman

- Signs of Life (Sparrow Records, 1996)

With Kenny Chesney

- When the Sun Goes Down (BNA Records, 2004)
- Be as You Are (BNA Records, 2005)
- The Road and the Radio (BNA Records, 2005)
- The Big Revival (Columbia Records, 2014)
- Cosmic Hallelujah (Columbia Records, 2016)
- Songs for the Saints (Warner Bros. Records, 2018)
- Here and Now (Blue Chair, 2020)
- Born (Blue Chair, 2024)

With Terri Clark

- Classic (EMI, 2012)

With Mark Collie

- Book of My Blues (Harvest, 2021)

With John Cowan

- John Cowan (Sugar Hill Records, 2000)

With Crosby, Stills, Nash & Young

- American Dream (Atlantic Records, 1988)

With Rodney Crowell

- The Houston Kid (Sugar Hill Records, 2001)
- The Outsider (Columbia Records, 2005)

With George Ducas

- George Ducas (Liberty Records, 1994)

With Ronnie Dunn

- Ronnie Dunn (Arista Records, 2011)
- Re-Dunn (Little Will-E Records, 2020)

With Radney Foster

- See What You Want to See (Arista Records, 1999)

With Peter Frampton

- Now (33rd Street Records, 2003)
- Fingerprints (Polydor Records, 2006)
- Thank You Mr. Churchill (New Door Records, 2010)
- Hummingbird in a Box (Red Distribution, 2014)
- Carry the Light (UMe Records, 2026)

With Vince Gill

- Next Big Thing (MCA Records, 2003)
- These Days (MCA Records, 2006)
- Guitar Slinger (MCA Records, 2011)

With William Lee Golden

- American Vagabond (MCA Records, 1986)

With Amy Grant

- House of Love (A&M Records, 1994)
- Behind the Eyes (A&M Records, 1997)
- Legacy... Hymns and Faith (A&M Records, 2002)
- Simple Things (A&M Records, 2003)
- Rock of Ages... Hymns and Faith (World Records, 2005)
- Somewhere Down the Road (Sparrow Records, 2010)

With Emmylou Harris and Rodney Crowell

- Old Yellow Moon (Nonesuch Records, 2013)

With Emmylou Harris and Mark Knopfler

- All the Roadrunning (Mercury Records, 2006)

With Rebecca Lynn Howard

- Rebecca Lynn Howard (MCA Records, 2000)

With Sonya Isaacs

- Sonya Isaacs (Lyric Street Records, 2000)

With Jewel

- Picking Up the Pieces (Sugar Hill Records, 2015)

With Jamey Johnson

- The Dollar (BNA Records, 2006)
- Living for a Song (Mercury Records, 2012)

With Toby Keith

- A Classic Christmas (Show Dog Nashville, 2007)
- Big Dog Daddy (Show Dog Nashville, 2007)
- Bullets in the Gun (Universal Music, 2010)
- Clancy's Tavern (Universal Music, 2011)
- Hope on the Rocks (Universal Music, 2012)
- Drinks After Work (Universal Music, 2013)
- 35 MPH Town (Universal Music, 2015)
- Peso in My Pocket (Universal Music, 2021)

With Charles Kelley

- The Driver (Capitol Records, 2016)

With Mark Knopfler

- Golden Heart (Vertigo Records, 1996)
- Sailing to Philadelphia (Mercury Records, 2000)
- The Ragpicker's Dream (Mercury Records, 2002)
- Shangri-La (Mercury Records, 2004)
- One Take Radio Sessions (Mercury Records, 2005)

With Alison Krauss

- Windy City (Capitol Records, 2017)

With Miranda Lambert

- Kerosene (Epic Records, 2005)
- Crazy Ex-Girlfriend (Columbia Records, 2007)
- Revolution (Columbia Records, 2009)

With Jim Lauderdale

- Whisper (BNA Records, 1997)
- Patchwork River (Thirty Tigers, 2010)
- I'm a Song (Sky Crunch Records, 2014)

With Cyndi Lauper

- Detour (Rhino Records, 2016)

With Kenny Marks

- Attitude (DaySpring Records, 1986)
- Make It Right (DaySpring Records, 1987)

With Mac McAnally

- Word of Mouth (DreamWorks, 1999)
- Semi-True Stories (Mailboat Records, 2004)
- Aka Nobody (Mailboat Records, 2015)
- Southbound: The Orchestra Project (Mailboat Records, 2017)

With Shane McAnally

- Shane McAnally (Curb Records, 2000)

With Parker McCollum

- Never Enough (MCA Records, 2023)

With Pat McLaughlin

- Next Five Miles (Creamstyle, 2003)
- Horsefly (Creamstyle, 2006)

With Jo Dee Messina

- Unmistakable: Love (Curb Records, 2010)

With Frankie Miller

- Long Way Home (Brighton Music, 2006)

With John Michael Montgomery

- Brand New Me (Atlantic Records, 2000)

With Allison Moorer

- Alabama Song (MCA Records, 1998)
- The Hardest Part (MCA Records, 2000)
- Down to Believing (Proper Records, 2015)

With Keb' Mo'

- Keep It Simple (Sony, 2004)

With Craig Morgan

- This Ole Boy (Black River, 2012)

With Willie Nelson

- To All the Girls... (Legacy Recordings, 2013)
- First Rose of Spring (Legacy Recordings, 2020)
- A Beautiful Time (Legacy Recordings, 2022)

With Joe Nichols

- III (Universal Music, 2005)

With Stevie Nicks

- In Your Dreams (Reprise Records, 2011)
- 24 Karat Gold: Songs from the Vault (Reprise Records, 2014)

With Chris Norman

- Chris Norman (Polydor Records, 1994)

With John Oates

- 1000 Miles Of Life (Phunk Shui Records, 2008)
- Good Road to Follow (Elektra Records, 2014)

With Anders Osborne

- Buddha & The Blues (Back on Dumaine Records, 2019)
- Picasso's Villa (5Th Ward Records, 2024)

With Jake Owen

- Barefoot Blue Jean Night (RCA Records, 2011)

With Orianthi Panagaris

- Heaven in This Hell (Robo Records, 2013)

With Lee Roy Parnell

- Midnight Believer (Vector Records, 2017)

With Dolly Parton

- Blue Smoke (Dolly Records, 2014)

With Kellie Pickler

- 100 Proof (BNA Records, 2012)

With Kim Richey

- Kim Richey (Mercury Records, 1995)

With Lionel Richie

- Tuskegee (Mercury Records, 2012)

With LeAnn Rimes

- Blue (Curb Records, 1996)
- Spitfire (Curb Records, 2013)

With Bob Seger

- Ride Out (Capitol Records, 2014)
- I Knew You When (Capitol Records, 2017)

With Blake Shelton

- Blake Shelton (Warner Bros. Records, 2001)
- Pure BS (Warner Bros. Records, 2007)

With Ashton Shepherd

- Sounds So Good (MCA Records, 2008)

With Jessica Simpson

- In This Skin (Columbia Records, 2003)

With Joss Stone

- LP1 (Surfdog Records, 2011)
- Never Forget My Love (Bay Street, 2022)

With Livingston Taylor

- There You Are Again (Coconut Bay, 2005)
- Last Alaska Moon (Coconut Bay, 2010)

With Josh Turner

- Everything Is Fine (MCA Records, 2007)
- Deep South (MCA Records, 2017)
- Country State of Mind (MCA Records, 2020)

With Bonnie Tyler

- Rocks and Honey (Warner Bros. Records, 2013)

With Roch Voisine

- Coup de tête (Les Disques Star Records, 1994)
- Americana (RCA Records, 2008)

With Joe Walsh

- Got Any Gum? (Warner Bros. Records, 1987)
- Ordinary Average Guy (Epic Records, 1991)

With Holly Williams

- Here with Me (Mercury Records, 2009)

With Brian Wilson

- No Pier Pressure (Capitol Records, 2015)

With Gretchen Wilson

- All Jacked Up (Epic Records, 2005)

With Lee Ann Womack

- Some Things I Know (MCA Records, 1998)
- I Hope You Dance (MCA Records, 2000)

With Chely Wright

- Never Love You Enough (MCA Records, 2001)

With Trisha Yearwood

- Jasper County (MCA Records, 2005)
- Heaven, Heartache and the Power of Love (Big Machine Records, 2007)
- PrizeFighter: Hit After Hit (RCA Records, 2014)

With Neil Young

- This Note's For You (Reprise Records, 1988)
- Freedom (Reprise Records, 1989)
- Prairie Wind (Reprise Records, 2005)
- Living with War (Reprise Records, 2006)
- Chrome Dreams II (Reprise Records, 2007)
- Fork in the Road (Reprise Records, 2009)

With Robin Zander

- Countryside Blvd (Big3 Records, 2011)
