= The Ragpicker's Dream =

Studio album by Mark Knopfler
- Released: 30 September 2002
- Recorded: January–June 2002
- Studio: Ocean Way, Nashville
- Genre: Roots rock, folk rock, blues
- Length: 55:34
- Label: Mercury; Warner Bros. (USA)
- Producer: Mark Knopfler, Chuck Ainlay

Mark Knopfler chronology
A Shot at Glory (2002)	The Ragpicker's Dream (2002)	Shangri-La (2004)

The Ragpicker's Dream is the third solo studio album by British singer-songwriter and guitarist Mark Knopfler, released on 30 September 2002 by Mercury Records internationally, and by Warner Bros. Records in the United States. The album received generally favorable reviews upon its release.

== Composition ==
The album is a collection of songs written from the point of view of poor but dignified itinerant men, struggling to get by in life, often enjoying small triumphs. Knopfler gives a folk imprint to the whole album without relying too heavily on the acoustic guitar. The first song, "Why Aye Man", was used as the theme tune for the third series of Auf Wiedersehen, Pet which first aired in 2002. The album contains numerous other references to North East England, including the village of Tow Law on "Hill Farmer's Blues".

== Artwork ==
The album cover shows a black and white photograph of a man and a woman dancing in a kitchen. The photograph was taken by Elliott Erwitt and is titled "Spain, Valencia, 1952, Robert and Mary Frank". The photo was also used as the book cover for two novels: The Marriage Artist by Andrew Winer (2010, Henry Holt & Company), and Ancient Light by John Banville (2012, Viking).

== Critical reception ==
Professional ratings
Aggregate scores
Source	Rating
Metacritic	62/100
Review scores
Source	Rating
AllMusic	3/5 stars
Rolling Stone	3/5 stars

In his review for AllMusic, Hal Horowitz gave the album three out of five stars, calling the album "a pleasant, classy, often inspired effort whose unassuming charms are best appreciated after repeated listenings." Horowitz continued:

The memorable riffage that fueled Dire Straits' most radio-friendly material has been discarded for a more pastoral approach, making this a perfect album for a rainy Sunday morning. Like his Notting Hillbillies side project, it isn't entirely unplugged, yet there is an emphasis on acoustic accompaniment to its predominantly ballad slant. Instead of leaving space for traditional soloing, Knopfler weaves his snake-like guitar between the words. This infuses a tense, edgy quality in even the most bucolic tracks.

Horowitz acknowledges Knopfler's versatility and breadth of music on the album: the atmospherics of "Hill Farmer's Blues" and "Fare Thee Well Northumberland", the unaccompanied folk/blues of "Marbletown", the "shuffling groove" on the spooky "You Don't Know You're Born", the mid-tempo "Coyote", the authentic honky tonk swing of "Daddy's Gone to Knoxville", and Roger Milleresque "Quality Shoe". Horowitz singles out the title track, which he describes as "an homage to the American roots music he's always admired."

== Track listing ==
All songs were written by Mark Knopfler.

No.	Title	Length
1.	"Why Aye Man"	6:14
2.	"Devil Baby"	4:05
3.	"Hill Farmer's Blues"	3:45
4.	"A Place Where We Used to Live"	4:34
5.	"Quality Shoe"	3:56
6.	"Fare Thee Well Northumberland"	6:29
7.	"Marbletown"	3:33
8.	"You Don't Know You're Born"	5:20
9.	"Coyote"	5:56
10.	"The Ragpicker's Dream"	4:20
11.	"Daddy's Gone to Knoxville"	2:48
12.	"Old Pigweed"	4:34
Total length:		55:34

Limited edition bonus disc (Note: The limited edition disc was available only in the United Kingdom and Canada.)

No.	Title	Length
1.	"Why Aye Man" (live at Shepherds Bush Empire, London, 23 July 2002)	6:48
2.	"Quality Shoe" (live at Shepherds Bush Empire, London, 23 July 2002)	4:01
3.	"Sailing to Philadelphia" (live at Massey Hall, Toronto, 3 May 2001)	7:18
4.	"Brothers in Arms" (live at Massey Hall, Toronto, 3 May 2001)	9:03
5.	"Why Aye Man" (enhanced video)	6:48
Total length:		33:58

Singles from the album

- Why Aye Man - Released on September 16, 2002

No.	Title	Length
1.	"Why Aye Man" (single edit)	4:10
2.	"Small Potatoes"	3:12
Total length:		7:22

== Personnel ==
Music

- Mark Knopfler – vocals, guitars
- Richard Bennett – guitars
- Jim Cox – piano, Hammond organ
- Guy Fletcher – keyboards, backing vocals (8)
- Glenn Worf – bass guitar
- Chad Cromwell – drums
- Glen Duncan – violin (11)
- Paul Franklin – pedal steel guitar (3,5,10)
- Mike Henderson – harmonica (6)
- Jimmy Nail – backing vocals (1)
- Tim Healy – backing vocals (1)

Production

- Mark Knopfler – producer
- Chuck Ainlay – producer, engineer, mixing
- John Saylor – engineer
- Jon Bailey – engineer
- Jake Jackson – engineer
- Tony Cousins – mastering
- Stephen Walker – art direction
- Neil Kellerhouse – art direction, design
- Elliot Erwitt – photography (front cover)
- Ken Sharp – photography
- North Bank Fred – photography (trains)

== Charts ==
=== Weekly charts ===
Chart (2002)	Peak position
Australian Albums (ARIA)	47
Austrian Albums (Ö3 Austria)	9
Belgian Albums (Ultratop Flanders)	6
Belgian Albums (Ultratop Wallonia)	5
Canadian Albums (Billboard)	18
Danish Albums (Hitlisten)	7
Dutch Albums (Album Top 100)	2
Finnish Albums (Suomen virallinen lista)	7
French Albums (SNEP)	4
German Albums (Offizielle Top 100)	4
Hungarian Albums (MAHASZ)	32
Irish Albums (IRMA)	47
Italian Albums (FIMI)	5
New Zealand Albums (RMNZ)	8
Norwegian Albums (VG-lista)	1
Polish Albums (ZPAV)	14
Spanish Albums (PROMUSICAE)	2
Swedish Albums (Sverigetopplistan)	5
Swiss Albums (Schweizer Hitparade)	5
UK Albums (OCC)	7
US Billboard 200	38

=== Year-end charts ===
Chart (2002)	Position
Dutch Albums (Album Top 100)	44
French Albums (SNEP)	83
German Albums (Offizielle Top 100)	61
Swedish Albums (Sverigetopplistan)	46
Swiss Albums (Schweizer Hitparade)	57
UK Albums (OCC)	183

== Certifications and sales ==
Region	Certification	Certified units/sales
Denmark (IFPI Danmark)	Gold	25,000^{^}
France (SNEP)	Gold	100,000^{*}
Germany (BVMI)	Gold	150,000^{^}
Netherlands (NVPI)	Gold	40,000^{^}
Norway (IFPI Norway)	Platinum	40,000^{*}
Spain (Promusicae)	Gold	50,000^{^}
Sweden (GLF)	Gold	30,000^{^}
Switzerland (IFPI Switzerland)	Gold	20,000^{^}
United Kingdom (BPI)	Gold	100,000^{*}
United States	—	143,000
^{*} Sales figures based on certification alone.^{^} Shipments figures based on certification alone.
