= Chuck Ainlay =

American record producer and audio engineer

- Born: Charles Ainley
- Occupations: Record producer, engineer, mixer
- Musical career
- Genres: Rock; country; pop; classical; comedy
- Years active: 1950–2006
- Labels: EMI; Parlophone; Apple

Chuck Ainlay is an American record producer and audio engineer. He has worked with Mark Knopfler on much of Knopfler's solo work, in addition to some Dire Straits material. He has 4 Grammy Awards and 5 nominations.

Along with Knopfler and Bob Ludwig, in 2006 he received the Grammy Award for Best Surround Sound Album for the surround production of the Dire Straits album Brothers in Arms.

== Discography ==
2014 - High South - High South (Engineer, Mixing, Co-Producer)
2014 - I'm a Fire - David Nail (Engineer, Mixing, Producer)
2014 - Platinum - Miranda Lambert (Engineer, Mixing, Producer)
2014 - Songs from the Movie - Mary Chapin Carpenter (Engineer, Mixing)
2013 - Amazing Grace - George Jones (Engineer)
2013 - Annie Up - Pistol Annies (Engineer, Mixing)
2013 - Greatest Hits - Jewel (Engineer, Mixing, Producer)
2013 - Gwen Sebastian - Gwen Sebastian (Engineer)
2013 - Love Will... - Trace Adkins (Engineer)
2013 - Old Yellow Moon - Emmylou Harris (Engineer, Mixing)
2013 - Bobby Kendall - Bobby Kendall (Mixing)
2013 - FCA! 35 Tour: An Evening with Peter Frampton - Peter Frampton (Mixing)
2013 - Lucky Sometimes - Weston Burt (Mixing)
2013 - Rising/Players in the Dark - Dr. Hook (Engineer)
2013 - The Calm After... - Travis Tritt (Mixing)
2013 - The Music of Nashville: Season 1, Vol. 2 (Additional Production, Engineer, Mixing)
2013 - The Highway - Holly Williams (Mixing)
2012 - 5 Classic Albums - George Strait (Engineer, Mixing, Engineer)
2012 - Ashes and Roses - Mary Chapin Carpenter (Engineer, Mixing)
2012 - Impressions - Chris Botti (Engineer, Producing)
2012 - Privateering - Mark Knopfler (Engineer, Mixing, Producer)
2012 - Tuskegee - Lionel Richie (Engineer, Mixing)
2011 - Barefoot Blue Jean Night - Jake Owen (Engineer, Mixing)
2011 - Four the Record - Miranda Lambert (Engineer, Mixing, Producer)
2011 - Hell on Heels - Pistol Annies (Engineer, Mixing, Producer)
2011 - Here for a Good Time - George Strait (Engineer, Mixing)
2011 - It's About Time/Ten Rounds - Tracy Byrd (Engineer)
2011 - It's All Good - Joe Nichols (Mixing)
2011 - Makin' Love and Music/Live in the UK - Dr. Hook (Assistant Engineer)
2011 - Ronnie Dunn - Ronnie Dunn (Mixing)
2011 - The Sound of a Million Dreams - David Nail (Engineer, Mixing, Producer)
2011 - Where Country Grows - Ashton Shepherd (Mixing)
2010 - 25 - Patty Larkin (Engineer)
2010 - Christian Kane EP - Christian Kane (Mixing)
2010 - Country Strong - [Original Motion Picture Soundtrack] (Engineer, Mixing, Producer)
2010 - Home for the Holidays - Point of Grace (Engineer, Mixing)
2010 - My Country: Smash Hits (Mixing)
2010 - Speak Now - Taylor Swift (Engineer)
2010 - Speak Now: Taylor Swift Karaoke (Engineer)
2010 - Sweet and Wild - Jewel (Mixing)
2010 - The Age of Miracles - Mary Chapin Carpenter (Engineer, Mixing)
2010 - The Band Perry - The Band Perry (Engineer)
2010 - The House Rules - Christian Kane (Mixing)
2010 - The Rounder Records Story (Engineer, Mixing)
2010 - Wrapped Up Good - The McClymonts (Mixing)
2009 - Get Lucky - Mark Knopfler (Engineer, Mixing, Producer)
2009 - Heart - Holly Hardin (Engineer)
2009 - Twang - George Strait (Engineer, Mixing)
2009 - World Wide Open - Love and Theft (Mixing)
2008 - Back in Your Arms - Tim Hockenberry (Mixing)
2008 - Believe - Katie Armiger (Mixing)
2008 - Burn Your Playhouse Down: The Unreleased Duets - George Jones (Engineer)
2008 - Call Me Crazy - Lee Ann Womack (Engineer, Mixing)
2008 - Christmas Duets - Elvis Presley (Engineer, Mixing, Producer)
2008 - Classic Christmas - George Strait (Engineer, Mixing)
2008 - From the Reach - Sonny Landreth (Engineer)
2008 - Good Happens - Brittini Black (Engineer, Mixing)
2008 - Live in Germany: Green Leaves & Blue Note - Chuck Leavell (Engineer, Remixing)
2008 - Lost & Found/Fervor - Jason & the Scorchers (Engineer)
2008 - My Side of Town - Jeremy McComb (Engineer, Mixing)
2008 - Revelations/What the World Needs Now Is Love - Wynonna Judd (Engineer, Mixing)
2008 - The EMI Years - Jason & the Scorchers (Engineer)
2008 - Troubadour - George Strait (Engineer, Mixing)
2008 - Wynonna Collector's Edition Tin - Wynonna Judd (Engineer, Mixing)
2007 - Bring It On - Kevin Fowler (Mixing)
2007 - Compadres: An Anthology of Duets - Marty Stuart (Engineer)
2007 - Crossroads Guitar Festival: 2007 - Eric Clapton (Surround Mix)
2007 - Heaven, Heartache and the Power of Love - Trisha Yearwood (Engineer, Mixing)
2007 - Kill to Get Crimson - Mark Knopfler (Engineer, Mixing, Producer)
2007 - Reba Duets - Reba McEntire (Engineer, Mixing)
2007 - Songbird: Rare Tracks & Forgotten Gems - Emmylou Harris (Engineer, Mixing, Producer)
2007 - The Calling - Mary Chapin Carpenter (Engineer, Mixing)
2007 - The Storm - Travis Tritt (Mixing)
2007 - The Very Best of Travis Tritt - Travis Tritt (Mixing)
2007 - Wild Animus, Part One: The Ram - Rich Shapero (Mixing)
2006 - All the Roadrunning - Mark Knopfler and Emmylou Harris (Engineer, Mixing, Producer)
2006 - Broken Bridges (Engineer)
2006 - Fingerprints - Peter Frampton (Engineer)
2006 - It Just Comes Natural - George Strait (Engineer, Mixing)
2006 - Larry the Cable Guy: Health Inspector (Mixing)
2006 - Men & Mascara - Julie Roberts (Engineer, Mixing)
2006 - My Best to You - Reba McEntire (Engineer)
2006 - New Tattoo - John Cowan (Mixing)
2006 - Rockie Lynne - Rockie Lynne (Engineer, Mixing)
2006 - Sinners Like Me - Eric Church (Mixing)
2006 - Taylor Swift - Taylor Swift (Engineer, Mixing)
2006 - The Ultimate Collection [Madacy 3 Disc] - George Strait (Mixing)
2006 - Your Man - Josh Turner (Engineer)
2005 - Anywhere But Here - Chris Cagle (Mixing)
2005 - Chronicles - George Strait (Engineer, Mixing)
2005 - Chronicles - Steve Earle (Engineer, Mixing)
2005 - Country Christmas: George Strait/Reba McEntire/Kenny Rogers (Engineer, Mixing)
2005 - Erika Jo - Erika Jo (Engineer, Mixing)
2005 - Gold - Peter Frampton (Mixing)
2005 - Livin' It Up/If You Ain't Lovin' (You Ain't Livin')/#7 - George Strait (Engineer)
2005 - One Take Radio Sessions - Mark Knopfler (Engineer, Mixing, Producer)
2005 - Private Investigations: The Best of Dire Straits & Mark Knopfler - Dire Straits (Engineer, Producer)
2005 - Somewhere Down in Texas - George Strait (Engineer)
2005 - Southscape - Chuck Leavell (Engineer, Mixing)
2005 - That Was Me: The Best of Todd Snider 1994-1998 - Todd Snider (Engineer, Mixing)
2005 - There's More Where That Came From - Lee Ann Womack (Mixing)
2005 - These Days - Clay Dubose (Mixing)
2005 - Whoever's in New England/Sweet Sixteen/What Am I Gonna Do About You - Reba McEntire (Engineer, Mixing)
2005 - Wide Open Spaces - Dixie Chicks (Mixing)
2004 - Between Here and Gone - Mary Chapin Carpenter (Engineer, Mixing)
2004 - Greatest Collection - Reba McEntire (Mixing)
2004 - Greatest Collection [2004] - George Strait (Engineer, Mixing)
2004 - Livin' the Dream - Ray Herndon (Engineer, Mixing)
2004 - My Honky Tonk History - Travis Tritt (Mixing)
2004 - Shangri-La - Mark Knopfler (Engineer, Mixing, Producer)
2004 - Twice the Speed of Life - Sugarland (Mixing)
2003 - For God and Country - Dolly Parton (Engineer, Mixing)
2003 - Have You Forgotten? - Darryl Worley (Mixing)
2003 - Honkytonkville - George Strait (Engineer, Mixing)
2003 - I've Always Been Crazy: A Tribute to Waylon Jennings (Mixing)
2003 - Now - Peter Frampton (Engineer, Mixing)
2003 - The Complete MCA Studio Recordings - Nanci Griffith (Engineer, Mixing)
2003 - The Very Best of Sheryl Crow - Sheryl Crow (Mixing)
2002 - Deeper Still - Beth Nielsen Chapman (Mixing)
2002 - Electric - Jack Ingram (Mixing)
2002 - Forgive - Rebecca Lynn Howard (Engineer)
2002 - Lookout for Hope - Jerry Douglas (Mixing)
2002 - Mindy McCready - Mindy McCready (Mixing)
2002 - Pearl Snaps - Deryl Dodd (Engineer, Mixing)
2002 - Stars & Guitars - Willie Nelson (Mixing)
2002 - Strong Enough - Travis Tritt (Mastering, Mixing)
2002 - The Ragpicker's Dream - Mark Knopfler (Engineer, Mixing, Producer)
2002 - Why Aye Man - Mark Knopfler (Engineer, Mixing, Producer)
2001 - Bandits [2001 Sony] (Producer)
2001 - Dancin' with Thunder: The Official Music of the PBR (Engineer, Mixing)
2001 - David Alan - David Alan (Engineer, Mixing, Producer)
2001 - Gravitational Forces - Robert Earl Keen Jr. (Mixing)
2001 - Memorize This Moment - Pacific Coast Highway (Engineer, Mixing, Producer)
2001 - Nobody's Got It All - John Anderson (Engineer, Mixing)
2001 - The Road Less Traveled - George Strait (Engineer)
2001 - Thunder and Roses - Pam Tillis (Mixing)
2000 - Believe: A Christmas Collection (Engineer)
2000 - Down the Road I Go - Travis Tritt (Mixing)
2000 - Faith in You - Steve Wariner (Mixing)
2000 - George Strait - George Strait (Engineer)
2000 - Hard Rain Don't Last - Darryl Worley (Mixing)
2000 - I'm Diggin' It - Alecia Elliott (Engineer)
2000 - Latest Greatest Straitest Hits - George Strait (Engineer)
2000 - Live in Detroit - Peter Frampton (Mixing)
2000 - New Day Dawning - Wynonna Judd (Mixing)
2000 - Real Live Woman - Trisha Yearwood (Mixing)
2000 - Rockin' Country Party Pack - Confederate Railroad (Mixing)
2000 - Sailing to Philadelphia - Mark Knopfler (Engineer, Mixing, Producer)
2000 - Sonya Isaacs - Sonya Isaacs (Engineer, Mixing)
2000 - String of Pearls - Prairie Oyster (Mixing)
2000 - String of Pearls: A Greatest Hits Collection - Prairie Oyster (Mixing)
1999 - Always Never the Same - George Strait (Engineer)
1999 - Bring It On - Keith Harling (Engineer)
1999 - Fly - Dixie Chicks (Engineer, Mixing)
1999 - How Do You Like Me Now?! - Toby Keith (Mixing)
1999 - It's About Time - Tracy Byrd (Engineer)
1999 - Live, Laugh, Love - Clay Walker (Mixing)
1999 - Merry Christmas Wherever You Are - George Strait (Engineer, Mixing)
1999 - Metroland - Mark Knopfler (Engineer, Mixing, Producer)
1999 - Onward Through It All - Jim Lauderdale (Engineer, Mixing)
1999 - Wildest Dreams - John Berry (Engineer, Mixing)
1998 - A Tribute to Tradition (Engineer, Mixing)
1998 - Back with a Heart Olivia Newton-John (Engineer, Mixing)
1998 - Long Walk Back - Junior Brown (Engineer, Mixing)
1998 - One Step at a Time - George Strait (Engineer, Mixing)
1998 - Prince of Egypt [Nashville] (Engineer, Mixing)
1998 - Ruby Lovett - Ruby Lovett (Engineer, Mixing)
1998 - Tammy Wynette...Remembered (Mixing)
1998 - The Horse Whisperer [Original Soundtrack] (Engineer, Mixing)
1998 - The Key - Vince Gill (Engineer, Mixing)
1998 - Travelin' Kind - Big House (Mixing)
1998 - Wag the Dog - Mark Knopfler (Engineer, Mixing, Producer)
1998 - Where Your Road Leads - Trisha Yearwood (Mixing)
1998 - Whisper - Jim Lauderdale (Engineer)
1998 - Wide Open Spaces - Dixie Chicks (Engineer, Mixing)
1997 - Amazing Grace, Vol. 2: A Country Salute to Gospel (Mixing)
1997 - Billy Yates - Billy Yates (Mixing)
1997 - Carrying Your Love with Me - George Strait (Mixing)
1997 - Collection - Wynonna Judd (Engineer, Mixing)
1997 - Evolution - Martina McBride (Mixing)
1997 - Greatest Hits - Pam Tillis (Mixing)
1997 - Real Thing - Hank Thompson (Engineer, Mixing)
1997 - So Much for the Afterglow - Everclear (Mixing)
1997 - Songbook: A Collection of Hits - Trisha Yearwood (Mixing)
1997 - The Day Finger Pickers Took Over the World - Chet Atkins (Mixing)
1997 - The Other Side - Wynonna Judd (Mixing)
1996 - Blue Clear Sky - George Strait (Mixing)
1996 - Everybody Knows - Trisha Yearwood (Engineer, Mixing)
1996 - Golden Heart - Mark Knopfler (Engineer, Mixing, Producer)
1996 - Greatest Hits - Confederate Railroad (Mixing)
1996 - High Lonesome Sound - Vince Gill (Audio Engineer, Engineer, Mixing)
1996 - NFL Country [Castle] (Engineer, Mixing)
1996 - Not Fade Away (Remembering Buddy Holly) (Engineer, Mixing)
1996 - One Ride in Vegas - Deryl Dodd (Engineer, Mixing)
1996 - Revelations - Wynonna Judd (Engineer, Mixing)
1996 - Somebody New - Rhett Akins (Mixing)
1996 - Step Right Up - Todd Snider (Engineer, Mixing)
1996 - The Associate (Mixing)
1996 - The Way I Should - Iris DeMent (Engineer, Mixing)
1996 - Twang!: A Tribute to Hank Marvin & the Shadows (Engineer, Mixing, Producer)
1996 - Twister [Original Soundtrack] (Engineer, Mixing, Producer)
1995 - Boys on the Side - Melissa Etheridge (Engineer, Mixing)
1995 - Greatest Hits [Warner Bros.] - Little Texas (Mixing)
1995 - Hurt City - Stacy Dean Campbell (Engineer)
1995 - Labor of Love - Radney Foster (Mixing)
1995 - Lisa Brokop - Lisa Brokop (Engineer)
1995 - Love Lessons - Tracy Byrd (Mixing)
1995 - NASCAR: Runnin' Wide Open (Engineer, Mixing)
1995 - Only One Moon - Prairie Oyster (Mixing)
1995 - The Road Goes on Forever - The Highwaymen (Mixing)
1995 - Thinkin' About You - Trisha Yearwood (Mixing)
1994 - Bradley Barn Sessions - George Jones (Engineer)
1994 - Country Music Made Me Do It - Mike Henderson (Mixing)
1994 - Fired Up - Dan Seals (Engineer, Mixing)
1994 - Let the Picture Paint Itself - Rodney Crowell (Engineer, Mixing)
1994 - Love and Honor - Ricky Van Shelton (Engineer, Mixing)
1994 - Mama's Hungry Eyes: Tribute to Merle Haggard (Mixing)
1994 - Rick Trevino - Rick Trevino (Mixing)
1994 - Skynyrd Frynds (Engineer, Mixing)
1994 - Sweetheart's Dance - Pam Tillis (Mixing)
1994 - When Love Finds You - Vince Gill (Engineer, Mixing)
1994 - Wild Love - Joy Lynn White (Engineer)
1993 - Easy Come, Easy Go - George Strait (Engineer, Mixing)
1993 - Greatest Hits, Vol. 2 - Reba McEntire (Engineer, Mixing)
1993 - Idle Hands - Tim Ryan (Engineer, Mixing)
1993 - Lisa Stewart - Lisa Stewart (Engineer, Mixing)
1993 - Red and Rio Grande - Doug Supernaw (Engineer, Mixing)
1993 - Tell Me Why - Wynonna Judd (Engineer, Mixing)
1993 - Wild Kentucky Skies - Marty Brown (Engineer)
1992 - Between Midnight & Hindsight - Joy Lynn White (Engineer, Mixing)
1992 - Confederate Railroad - Confederate Railroad (Mixing)
1992 - Del Rio, Texas, 1959 - Radney Foster (Mixing)
1992 - Essential, Vol. 1 (Are You Ready for the Country?) - Jason & the Scorchers (Engineer)
1992 - First Time for Everything - Little Texas (Engineer, Mixing)
1992 - From Hell to Paradise - The Mavericks (Engineer, Mixing)
1992 - Live and Learn - Mac McAnally (Engineer, Mixing)
1992 - Pure Country - George Strait (Engineer, Mixing)
1992 - The Dirt Road - Sawyer Brown (Engineer, Mixing)
1992 - Watch Me - Lorrie Morgan (Engineer, Mixing)
1992 - Wynonna - Wynonna Judd (Engineer, Mixing)
1991 - Alchemy Live [Video] - Dire Straits (Remixing)
1991 - High & Dry - Marty Brown (Engineer)
1991 - Maverick - Hank Williams Jr. (Engineer)
1991 - On Every Street - Dire Straits (Engineer)
1991 - Tempted - Marty Stuart (Engineer, Overdub Engineer)
1990 - Acoustic Christmas [Columbia] (Engineer, Mixing)
1990 - Balconies - Matt Rollings (Engineer, Mixing)
1990 - Burnin' up the Road - McBride & the Ride (Engineer, Mixing)
1990 - King Tears - Walter Hyatt (Engineer, Mixing)
1990 - On Down the Line - Patty Loveless (Engineer, Mixing)
1989 - Hillbilly Rock - Marty Stuart (Engineer, Mixing)
1989 - House on Old Lonesome Road - Conway Twitty (Mixing)
1989 - If Only for One Night - Lee Greenwood (Engineer)
1989 - Letting Go - Giles Reaves (Engineer, Mixing)
1989 - Lyle Lovett and His Large Band - Lyle Lovett (Engineer, Mixing)
1989 - The Telluride Sessions - Strength in Numbers (Engineer, Mixing)
1989 - Whatever Works - John Jarvis (Engineer)
1988 - Honky Tonk Angel - Patty Loveless (Engineer)
1988 - Little Love Affairs - Nanci Griffith (Engineer, Mixing)
1988 - Nothing Is Lost - Giles Reaves (Engineer, Mixing)
1988 - Rebels Without a Clue - The Bellamy Brothers (Mixing)
1988 - Still in Your Dreams - Conway Twitty (Mixing)
1988 - View from the House - Kim Carnes (Mixing)
1987 - A Man Called Hoss - Waylon Jennings (Mixing)
1987 - Borderline - Conway Twitty (Mixing)
1987 - Crazy from the Heart - The Bellamy Brothers (Mixing)
1987 - Country Rap - The Bellamy Brothers (Engineer)
1987 - Exit 0 - Steve Earle (Engineer, Mixing)
1987 - Hangin' Tough - Waylon Jennings (Mixing)
1987 - Merry Christmas to You [1993] - Reba McEntire (Mixing)
1987 - Ocean Front Property - George Strait (Engineer)
1987 - The Last One to Know - Reba McEntire (Mixing)
1986 - #7 - George Strait (Engineer)
1986 - Guitar Town - Steve Earle (Engineer, Mixing)
1986 - Something Constructive - John Jarvis (Engineer, Mixing)
1986 - What Am I Gonna Do About You - Reba McEntire (Engineer)
1986 - Wheels Restless Heart (Engineer, Mixing)
1986 - Whoever's in New England - Reba McEntire (Mixing)
1986 - Wunjo - Giles Reaves (Engineer, Mixing)
1985 - Have I Got a Deal for You - Reba McEntire (Engineer)
1985 - Something Special - George Strait (Mixing)
1984 - Let Me Be the First - Deborah Allen (Engineer)
