= Roots rock =

Genre of rock music

- Stylistic origins: Rockabilly; Country; blues; folk; country folk; folk-blues; folk rock
- Cultural origins: 1960s, United States

Other topics
- Alternative country; blues rock; country rock; folk rock; heartland rock; pub rock (United Kingdom); rock and roll; Southern rock; swamp rock

Roots rock is a genre of rock music that looks back to rock's origins in folk, blues, and country music. First emerging in the late 1960s, it is seen as a response to the perceived excesses of the then dominant psychedelic and the developing progressive rock. Because roots music (Americana) is often used to mean folk and world musical forms, roots rock is sometimes used in a broad sense to describe any rock music that incorporates elements of this music.

The 2000s saw a new interest in "roots" music. One proof of that is the specific Grammy Award given since 2015, notably to Jon Batiste in 2022. According to the Grammy website, "This category recognizes excellence in Americana, bluegrass, blues or folk recordings in modern and/or traditional vocal and instrumental styles, as well as original material by artists who use traditional and/or modern roots elements, sounds and instrumental techniques as the basis for their recordings."

== History ==
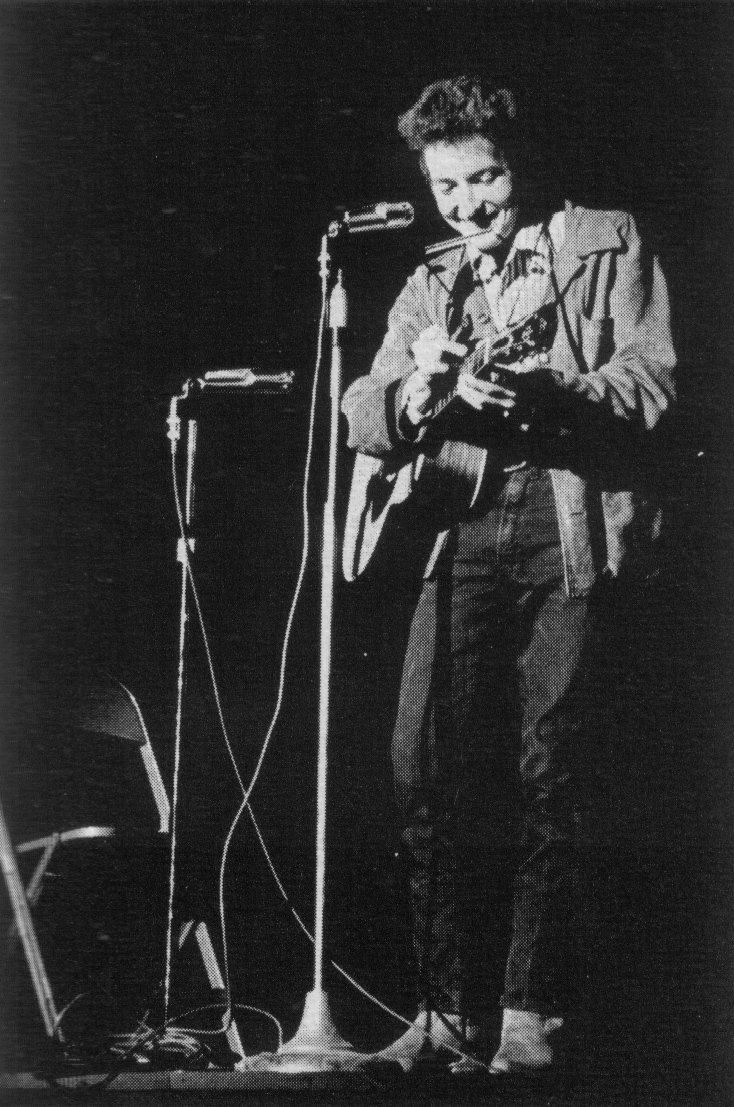
Bob Dylan

In 1966, as many rock artists moved towards expansive and experimental psychedelia, Bob Dylan spearheaded the back-to-basics roots revival when he went to Nashville to record the album Blonde on Blonde, using notable local musicians like Charlie McCoy. This, and the subsequent more clearly country-influenced albums, John Wesley Harding (1967) and Nashville Skyline (1969), have been seen as creating the genre of country folk, a route pursued by a number of, largely acoustic, folk musicians. Other acts that followed the back to basics trend in different ways were the Canadian/American group The Band and the California-based Creedence Clearwater Revival, both of which mixed basic rock and roll with folk, country, and blues, to be among the most successful and influential bands of the late 1960s. At the same time the Grateful Dead, a band previously associated with the San Francisco sound and known for ferocious psychedelic improvisation, followed in the footsteps of Crosby, Stills & Nash to focus on Americana-styled songwriting for their 1970 albums Workingman's Dead and American Beauty. The same movement saw the beginning of the recording careers of Californian solo artists like Ry Cooder, Bonnie Raitt, and Lowell George.

=== Blues rock ===
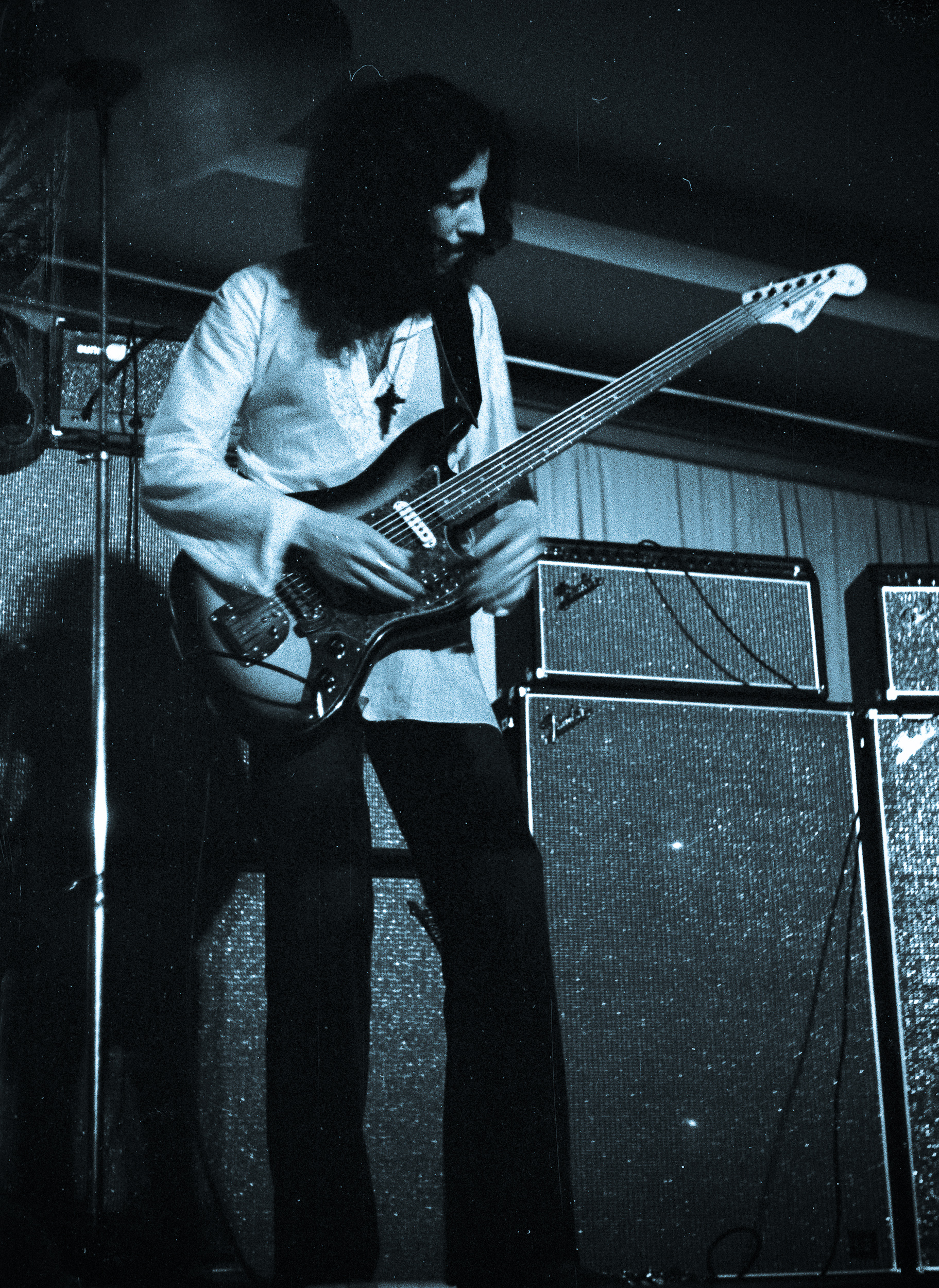
Peter Green performing with Fleetwood Mac in 1970

The blues boom overlapped, both chronologically and in terms of personnel, with the earlier, wider rhythm and blues phase, which had begun to peter out in the mid-1960s leaving a nucleus of instrumentalists with a wide knowledge of blues forms and techniques, which they would carry into the pursuit of more purist blues interests. Blues Incorporated and John Mayall and the Bluesbreakers were well known in the London Jazz and emerging R&B circuits, but the Bluesbreakers began to gain some national and international attention, particularly after the release of Blues Breakers with Eric Clapton album (1966), considered one of the seminal British blues recordings. From 1966 to 1968, young Englishmen formed blues rock bands such as Cream, Fleetwood Mac, Keef Hartley Band, Ten Years After, and Free. In America, Paul Butterfield Blues Band, Canned Heat, and Johnny Winter performed at Woodstock Festival 1969.

=== Country rock ===
Dylan's lead was also followed by the Byrds, who were joined by Gram Parsons in 1968. Earlier in the year Parsons had already recorded Safe at Home with the International Submarine Band, which made extensive use of pedal steel guitar and is seen by some as the first true country-rock album. The result of Parsons tenure in the Byrds was Sweetheart of the Rodeo (1968), generally considered one of the finest and most influential recordings in the genre. The Byrds continued for a brief period in the same vein, but Parsons left soon after the album was released to be joined by another ex-Byrds member Chris Hillman in forming the Flying Burrito Brothers. Over the next two years they recorded the albums The Gilded Palace of Sin (1969) and Burrito Deluxe (1970), which helped establish the respectability and parameters of the genre, before Parsons departed to pursue a solo career.

Country rock was a particularly popular style in the California music scene of the late 1960s, and was adopted by bands including C.C.R., Poco, and New Riders of the Purple Sage. Some folk-rockers followed the Byrds into the genre, among them the Beau Brummels and the Nitty Gritty Dirt Band. A number of performers also enjoyed a renaissance by adopting country sounds, including: the Everly Brothers, whose Roots album (1968) is usually considered some of their finest work; former teen idol Ricky Nelson (after dropping the "Y" from his name and letting his hair grow) who became the frontman for the Stone Canyon Band; Michael Nesmith who formed the First National Band after his departure from the Monkees; and Neil Young who moved in and out of the genre throughout his career. One of the few acts to successfully move from the country side towards rock were the bluegrass band The Dillards.

The greatest commercial success for country rock came in the 1970s, with the Doobie Brothers mixing in elements of R&B, Emmylou Harris (a former backing singer for Parsons) becoming the "Queen of country-rock", and Linda Ronstadt creating a highly successful pop-orientated brand of the genre. Members of Ronstadt's former backing band went on to form the Eagles (made up of members of the Burritos, Poco, and Stone Canyon Band), and emerged as one of the most successful rock acts of all time, producing albums that included Desperado (1973) and Hotel California (1976). Country rock began to fade in the late 1970s in the face of punk and new wave trends.

=== Southern rock ===
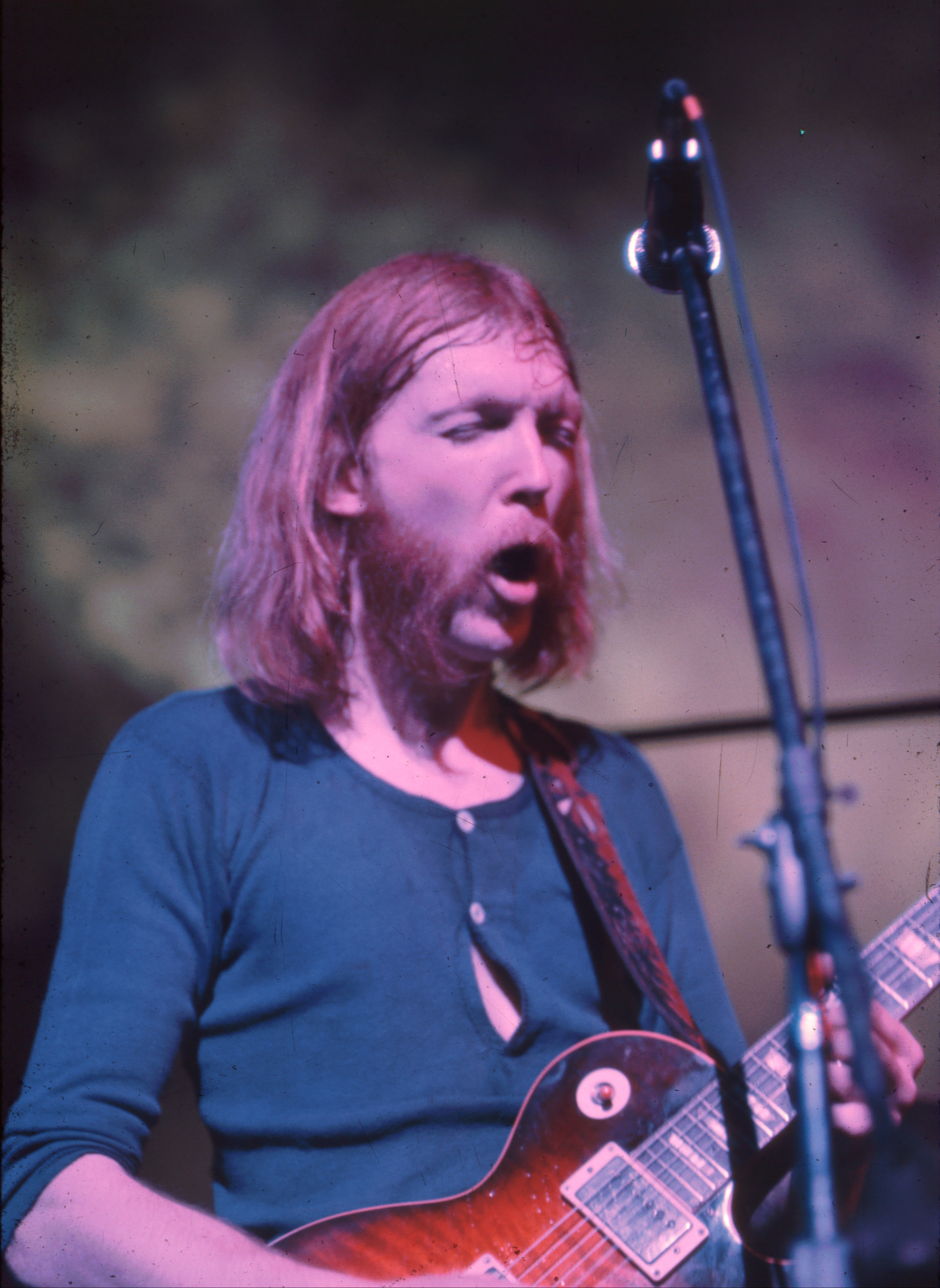
Duane Allman playing guitar at the Fillmore East, 26 June 1971 (late show)

Although the Southern states had been, as much as anywhere, the birthplace of rock and roll, after the decline of rockabilly in the late 1950s, it was not until the early 1970s that a distinctive regional style of rock music emerged. (This was despite some successful bands from the region, a major contribution to the evolution of soul music in the Stax-Volt records company and the existence of the Muscle Shoals and FAME Studios). The founders of Southern rock are usually thought to be the Allman Brothers Band, who developed a distinctive sound, largely derived from blues rock, but incorporating elements of boogie, soul, and country; combining hard rock instrumentation and rhythms with accented vocals and Duane Allman's slide guitar.

Of the acts that followed the Allmans into the emerging genre, the most successful was Lynyrd Skynyrd, who with songs like "Free Bird" (1973) and "Sweet Home Alabama" (1974) helped establish the "Good ol' boy" image of the subgenre and the general shape of 1970s guitar rock. They were followed by many other bands, including the Atlanta Rhythm Section, ZZ Top, Black Oak Arkansas, Potliquor, Barefoot Jerry, Grinderswitch, Wet Willie, Blackfoot, Johnny Winter, Edgar Winter Group, Sea Level, and the more country-influenced The Marshall Tucker Band. After the loss of original members of the Allmans and Lynyrd Skynyrd, the genre began to fade in popularity in the late 1970s, but was sustained the 1980s with acts like the Outlaws, Georgia Satellites, the Fabulous Thunderbirds, Stevie Ray Vaughan & Double Trouble, Jimmie Vaughan, Pointblank, .38 Special, and Molly Hatchet.

=== Swamp rock ===
Swamp rock originated in the mid-1960s as a fusion of rockabilly and soul music with swamp blues, country music and funk. The style also drew from beat music, country blues, Cajun music and New Orleans rhythm and blues. Part of the early swamp rock scene were John Fogerty & C.C.R., Leon Russell, Dale Hawkins, Tony Joe White, and Delaney & Bonnie.

=== Heartland rock ===
The term heartland rock was first used in the early 1970s to describe Midwestern arena rock groups like Kansas, REO Speedwagon, and Styx, but came to be associated with a more socially concerned form of roots rock more directly influenced by folk, country, and rock and roll. It has been seen as an American Midwest and Rust Belt counterpart to West Coast country rock and the Southern rock of the American South. Led by figures who had initially been identified with punk and new wave, it was most strongly influenced by acts such as Bob Dylan, the Byrds, Creedence Clearwater Revival, and Van Morrison, 1960s garage rock, and the Rolling Stones.

Exemplified by the commercial success of singer songwriters Bruce Springsteen, Bob Seger, and Tom Petty, along with less widely known acts such as Southside Johnny and the Asbury Jukes and Joe Grushecky and the Houserockers, it was partly a reaction to post-industrial urban decline in the East and Mid-West, often dwelling on issues of social disintegration and isolation, beside a form of good-time rock and roll revivalism. The genre reached its commercial, artistic, and influential peak in the mid-1980s, with Springsteen's Born in the USA (1984), topping the charts worldwide and spawning a series of top ten singles, together with the arrival of artists including John Cougar/Mellencamp, Steve Earle, and more gentle singer/songwriters such as Bruce Hornsby. It also impacted the United Kingdom in the 1980s through Dire Straits. It can also be heard as an influence on artists as diverse as Billy Joel and Kid Rock. Though various heartland rock acts had sustained success through the 1990s, such as Tom Petty, Bruce Springsteen, The Wallflowers, and to a lesser extent, the BoDeans and Los Lobos, Heartland rock's commercial prosperity and general popularity began to fade away as early as the early 1990s. As rock music in general, and blue collar and white working class themes in particular, lost influence with younger audiences, heartland's artists turned to more personal works. Subsequently, however, American bands the Killers and the War on Drugs and English act Sam Fender firmly integrated the heartland rock genre into their respective musical styles.

=== 1980s revival ===
The term "roots rock" was coined during the mid-1980s. A number of key bands were defined as cow punk, punk rockers who played country music, including Jason & The Scorchers from Tennessee, Dash Rip Rock from Louisiana, and Drivin N Cryin from Georgia, but the centre of the cow punk movement became Los Angeles, thanks to bands including the Long Ryders, Tex & the Horseheads, the Rave-Ups, Lone Justice, and Rank and File. Also part of this trend and enjoying some mainstream success were Gun Club, Chris Isaak, Violent Femmes, BoDeans, and Los Lobos.

In addition the alternative country movement, producing such figures as Steve Earle, Lucinda Williams, and Uncle Tupelo, can be seen as part of the roots rock tendency. The movement began to decline in popularity again in the 1990s but produced some bands like Son Volt, Wilco, and The Bottle Rockets. In the mid-1990s, Hootie & the Blowfish, the Wallflowers and Gin Blossoms led the way for "a pop-conscious roots-rock resurgence via the alternative charts", according to Trouser Press.

After disbanding Dire Straits in 1995, lead singer Mark Knopfler has largely returned to a roots-rock sound across his ten albums.

== See also ==
- List of roots rock bands and musicians
